= Azerbaijan–OIC relations =

Bilateral relations

In 1991, Azerbaijan joined the Organisation of Islamic Cooperation and started to build relations with the organization. As a result, the ambassador of Azerbaijan to Saudi Arabia was given a mandate of permanent representative of Azerbaijan to the General Secretariat of the OIC in May 1994.

== Cooperation ==
Former Azerbaijani President Heydar Aliyev met with the OIC Secretary General in Baku in 1994. Furthermore, Aliyev attended and addressed the 7th Summit of Heads of States and Governments of the OIC member countries in Casablanca that year.

In 2005, Azerbaijani President Ilham Aliyev attended the 3rd Extraordinary Summit of the OIC in Mecca. In 2015, Aliyev met with the Secretary General of the Organization of Islamic Cooperation (OIC), Iyad bin Amin Madani.

Baku hosted the 33rd OIC Foreign Ministers Conference on 19–21 June 2006. Mehriban Aliyeva, president of the Heydar Aliyev Foundation initiated the International Forum on "Expanding the Role of Women in Cross-Cultural Dialogue" in Baku on June 10–11, 2008.

The delegation led by Elmar Mammadyarov, the Azerbaijani Ministry of Foreign Affairs regularly participates at the OIC Foreign Ministers conferences.

On 22–23 November 2011, the Islamic Conference Youth Forum for Dialogue and Cooperation (ICYF-DC), Heydar Aliyev Foundation and Azerbaijani government organized the Founding Convention of the OIC Countries Young Entrepreneurs Network in Baku. ICYEN is a collaborative initiative to create a platform for young Muslim entrepreneurs.

In 2017, the 4th Islamic Solidarity Games were held in Azerbaijan. An official opening ceremony was organized in Baku on May 12, 2017.

Azerbaijan has achieved cooperation with other bodies of the OIC. Mehriban Aliyeva's activities contributed to the development of ties between Azerbaijan and the OIC. On 26 November 2006, Abdulaziz Othman al-Twaijri, Director General of ISESCO made Aliyeva a goodwill ambassador of ISESCO for her efforts to bring civilizations closer to each other. Ekmeleddin Ihsanoghlu made her a special envoy of the OIC on humanitarian affairs for her activities in the humanitarian field while attending the International Forum on "Expanding the Role of Women in Cross-Cultural Dialogue" which was held in Baku on 10–11 June 2008.

On 3 May 2017, a delegation led by Secretary General of the Organization of Islamic Cooperation (OIC) Yousef Al-Othaimeen met with Azerbaijani President Ilham Aliyev. The meeting involved the discussions over the solidarity and cooperation between Muslim countries, Azerbaijan's membership to the OIC and tourism potentials.

Azerbaijan was represented by the Minister of Foreign Affairs at two summits of the Organisation of Islamic Cooperation, held on November 12–13, 2000 in Doha and on 16–17 November 2003 in Putrajaya, Malaysia. The position of Azerbaijan was defended, and documents were adopted, which required the withdrawal of Armenian troops from the occupied Azerbaijani territories, respect for the territorial integrity of the country, as well as compliance with four UN resolutions at that summits.

The founding meeting of the Youth forum of the Organization of the Islamic Conference was held in 2004 in Azerbaijan.

== Nagorno-Karabakh conflict ==
The Nagorno-Karabakh conflict between Armenia and Azerbaijan became a discussion topic since Azerbaijan had been admitted to the membership of the OIC. The OIC adopted a number of resolutions condemning Armenia's occupation of Azerbaijani territories:

- Final Communique of the 7th Session of The Islamic Summit Conference Casablanca, Morocco (13–15 December 1994) .
- Final Communique of the 8th Session of The Islamic Summit Conference Tehran, Iran (9–11 December 1997)
- Final Communique of the 9th Session of The Islamic Summit Conference Doha, Qatar (12–13 November 2000)
- Resolution no. 25/9-c (is) on the destruction and desecration of Islamic historical and cultural relics and shrines in the occupied Azeri territories resulting from the republic of Armenia's aggression against the Republic of Azerbaijan
- Resolution No.21/9-P(IS) on the aggression of the Republic of Armenia against the Republic of Azerbaijan

Documents and resolutions on the Nagorno-Karabakh conflict were approved at the OIC Foreign Ministers conferences, too. For instance, resolution No. 10/42-POL "On the Aggression of the Republic of Armenia against the Republic of Azerbaijan" adopted in the framework of the Forty Second Session of the Council of Foreign Ministers, held in Kuwait, State of Kuwait on 27–28 May 2015. The resolution strongly condemns Armenian aggression against Azerbaijan, considers the actions committed by the Armenian Armed Forces against the Azerbaijani civilians and other protected persons as crimes against humanity and calls the United Nations Security Council to recognize the existence of aggression against Azerbaijan.

The OIC Secretary General regularly commemorates the Khojaly Massacre of February 1992. In 2017, OIC Secretary-General Yousef al-Othaimeen called for the "immediate" and "unconditional" withdrawal of the Armenian Armed Forces from occupied Azerbaijani territories while marking the 25th anniversary of the 1992 Khojaly Genocide.

== See also ==
- Foreign relations of Azerbaijan
- Organisation of Islamic Cooperation
- Azerbaijan–European Union relations
- Azerbaijan–NATO relations
- Azerbaijan in the Council of Europe
- Azerbaijan and GUAM relations
- Azerbaijan–OBSEC relations
- Azerbaijan and Organization for Economic Co-operation
- Azerbaijan–Organization of Turkic States relations
- Azerbaijan–OSCE relations
- Azerbaijan and the United Nations
