= Turkey in the Council of Europe =

Overview of membership and participation

Turkey–Council of Europe relations
- Turkey: Council of Europe

Turkey is a member of the Council of Europe. Membership is obligatory for joining the European Union. As of 2025 more than a third of the cases pending at the European Court of Human Rights (ECHR) are about Turkey. While Turkey officially has diplomatic relations with 44 the Council of Europe member states, it does not have diplomatic relations with 2 the Council of Europe member states (Armenia and Cyprus).

== History ==
Turkey officially exited the monitoring process in 2004 when it began accession negotiations with the European Union. In 2017, the Parliamentary Assembly of the Council of Europe (PACE) unanimously put Turkey back under monitoring due to setbacks in democracy, human rights, the rule of law, freedom of expression, and judicial independence.

In 2025 the commissioner for human rights complained about lack of progress in the Osman Kavala v. Türkiye, Selahattin Demirtaş (no.2) v. Türkiye and Yüksekdağ Şenoğlu and Others v. Türkiye cases.

=== Turkey's opposition to NATO membership of two the Council of Europe member states ===
In May 2022, Turkey opposed two the Council of Europe member states, Finland and Sweden, joining NATO because according to Turkey, they host terrorist organisations which act against Turkey (including the PKK, KCK, PYD, YPG and Gülen movement). Turkey urged the countries to lift their arms embargo on Turkey, not to support the organizations, and to extradite members of the Gülen movement and PKK from the two member states. In May 2022, Turkey requested the extradition of members of the Gülen movement and PKK from the two member states, but this was rejected. In May 2022, Turkey quickly blocked two the Council of Europe member states Finland and Sweden from starting their NATO membership applications. On 18 May 2022, Turkey asked the two member states to end their support for PKK, PYD, YPG and the Gülen movement and to stop their activities. On 28 June 2022, Turkey signed the tripartite memorandum with Finland and Sweden at the Madrid summit in Madrid, Spain. In July 2022, Turkish President Recep Tayyip Erdoğan announced that if the two the Council of Europe member states (Finland and Sweden) do not extradite alleged members of the Gülen movement and the PKK, they will not approve the NATO membership of the two countries. Turkey called on two the Council of Europe members, Finland and Sweden, to fulfill their commitments in the tripartite memorandum. Turkey asked the two member states to end the Kurdish demonstrations. Turkey asked the two member countries to end what it said was Islamophobia and to stop the burning of the Quran. While Finland was given NATO approval by Turkey in March 2023, the Turkish parliament did not accept Sweden's application to join NATO until 23 January 2024.

== See also ==
- Armenia in the Council of Europe
- Azerbaijan in the Council of Europe
- Greece in the Council of Europe
- Russia in the Council of Europe
- Human rights in Turkey
