= Azerbaijan–Organization of Turkic States relations =

Member states of Organization of Turkic States with Hungary and Turkmenistan as observer states.

Relations between Turkic Council and Azerbaijan have continued from 2009 until present. Taking into account the establishment date (October 3, 2009) of the organization, Azerbaijan continues relations as a founding member of the council.

== Trade, investment, and the economy ==
Economic relations among the member states considered as the main field that Turkic Council emphasizes cooperation and arranges several meetings and activities in order to achieve improvements. According to the First meeting of the Ministers of Economy held in Astana in 2011, the Working Groups on Entrepreneurship was launched in order to improve investment conditions and foster diversification of the economy in member states. A number of Business Forums were organized on the base of this meeting where several businesspersons from the member countries attended in. In October 2014, the Third Business Forum held in Nakhchivan, Azerbaijan after the Fourth meeting of the Ministers of Economy of the Turkic Speaking States in Issyk-Kul on 19–20 June 2014.

== Transport and customs ==
Within the framework of the Second meeting of the ICT ministers of the Turkic Council held in Istanbul on November 9, 2017, the minister of Transport, Communications and High Technologies of Azerbaijan Ramin Guluzade put forward an initiative to implement measures for mutual recognition of electronic signature for the increase of turnover in e-commerce. The meeting followed by the statements of Secretary-General of Turkic Council Ramil Hasanov, Ahmet Arslan Minister of Transport, Maritime Affairs and Communications of the Republic of Turkey, Abdysamat Sagymbayev Deputy Minister of the Committee of Information Technology and Communications of the Kyrgyzstan, Vitaliy Yaroshenko Deputy Chairman of the Communication, Information and Mass Media under Ministry of ICT of Kazakhstan.

On August 16, 2013, the Third Summit of the Turkic Council was held in Gabala, Azerbaijan by the participation of the presidents of the founding countries such as the president of Azerbaijan Ilham Aliyev, president of Kazakhstan Nursultan Nazarbayev, president of Kyrgyzstan Almazbek Atambayev, president of Turkey Abdullah Gul and deputy prime minister of Turkmenistan Sapardurdy Toyliyev. “Transport and Connectivity” was the primary subject of the summit. The summit finished by signing a “Declaration of the Third Summit of the Cooperation Council of Turkic Speaking States. However, during the summit “Protocol of Cooperation among the Ministries of Foreign Affairs of member states of the Turkic Council” was signed.

Azerbaijan cooperates with neighboring member states in a sphere of energy security and conducts activity in the Caspian Sea with Kazakhstan and Turkmenistan and the main export routes pass through Turkey. In July 2013 the first meeting of Ministers of Transport held in Baku. Within the framework of the meeting, main issues were discussed in order to accomplish an integrated transport through the Central Transport Corridor passing through member states and seaports of Caspian and Black Sea.

According to the speech of the Azerbaijani president Ilham Aliyev at the Fifth Summit of the Council of Cooperation of Turkic Speaking States, Azerbaijan cooperates and invests in neighboring countries, Turkic Speaking states such as Kazakhstan and Turkmenistan. He stressed the role of Azerbaijan as a transit country for them. Furthermore, the commence of the building a new International Sea Trade Port in Baku with 25 million tons of cargo capacity and Baku-Tbilisi-Kars railway will connect Asia and Europe by passing through Kazakhstan and Azerbaijan.

== Culture and art ==
Turkic Culture and Heritage foundation launched by the initiative of Azerbaijan at the Second Summit of Turkic Council held in Bishkek in 2012. In 2015 foundation started its activity as an international organization. Headquarter of the organization is located in Baku. On September 27, the Ministry of Youth and Sport of the Azerbaijan and Turkic Council organized a youth festival dedicated to the election of Ganja as the European Youth Capital – 2016.

== Politics and security ==
Taking into account the Nakhchivan agreement, the Council of the Ministers of Foreign Affairs assemble a day before annual summits for discussing issues and active participation in the sphere of politics and security. Since 2013, member states have established consultations on security issues. A number of meetings organized such as the First and Second meeting of Deputy Foreign Ministers of member states, respectively, in Baku and in Astana. The main issues discussed in these meetings covered both regional and international security problems such as, Armenia – Azerbaijan Nagorno Karabakh conflict, the Istanbul process of Afghanistan and fighting against international terrorism. Within the framework of the Fifth Summit Turkic Council held in Astana in September 2015, governors adopted the declaration, which reflects paragraph on Nagorno Karabakh conflict “reiterate the importance of the Armenia – Azerbaijan Nagorno Karabakh conflict on the basis of sovereignty, territorial integrity and inviolability of the internationally recognized border of Azerbaijan”.

=== International Conference "Impact of Geopolitical Changes on the Future of the Turkic Council" ===
The Center for Strategic Studies held a conference titled "Impact of Geopolitical Changes on the Future of the Turkic Council" in Baku on November 10, 2017. Speakers included the head of the Foreign Policy Department of the Azerbaijani Presidential Administration Arastu Habibbayli, director of the Center for the Strategic Studies in Azerbaijan Farhad Mammedov, secretary-general of the Cooperation Council of Turkic Speaking States Ramil Hasanov, head of the department of the Center for Strategic Studies under the Turkish Foreign Ministry Fatma Cigdem Tenker Koksal, executive deputy director of the Institute of Strategic Studies under the president of Kazakhstan Kazbek Issayev, and the Kyrgyz Institute for Strategic Studies Nuradil Baidoletov.

=== Seventh Turkic Council Summit ===
On October 15, 2019, Baku hosted the Seventh Turkic Council Summit attended by Azerbaijani President Ilham Aliyev, former President of Kazakhstan Nursultan Nazarbayev, President of Kyrgyzstan Sooronbai Jeenbekov, President of Turkey Recep Tayyip Erdoğan, President of Uzbekistan Shavkat Mirziyoyev, as well as Deputy PM of Turkmenistan Purli Agamyradov as a guest, Prime Minister of Hungary Viktor Orban as an observer and heads of Turkic cooperation institutions. The participants celebrated the tenth anniversary of the Nakhchivan Agreement on the establishment of the Turkic Council in addition to Uzbekistan’s joining the organization as a full-fledged member. The title of Honorary Chairman of the Turkic Council was given to Nursultan Nazarbayev. In the conclusion of the Summit, the Heads of States signed Baku Declaration. Besides, the presidency in the Council officially passed to Azerbaijan.

=== 2020 Nagorno-Karabakh clashes ===
In 2020, during the conflict starting in September, the Secretary General of the Turkic Council Baghdad Amreyev declared his support to Azerbaijan against Armenia.

== See also ==
- Foreign relations of Azerbaijan
- Organization of Turkic States
- Azerbaijan in the Council of Europe
- Azerbaijan–European Union relations
- Azerbaijan–NATO relations
- Azerbaijan–OBSEC relations
- Azerbaijan–OSCE relations
- Azerbaijan and the United Nations
