= Member states of the Council of Europe =

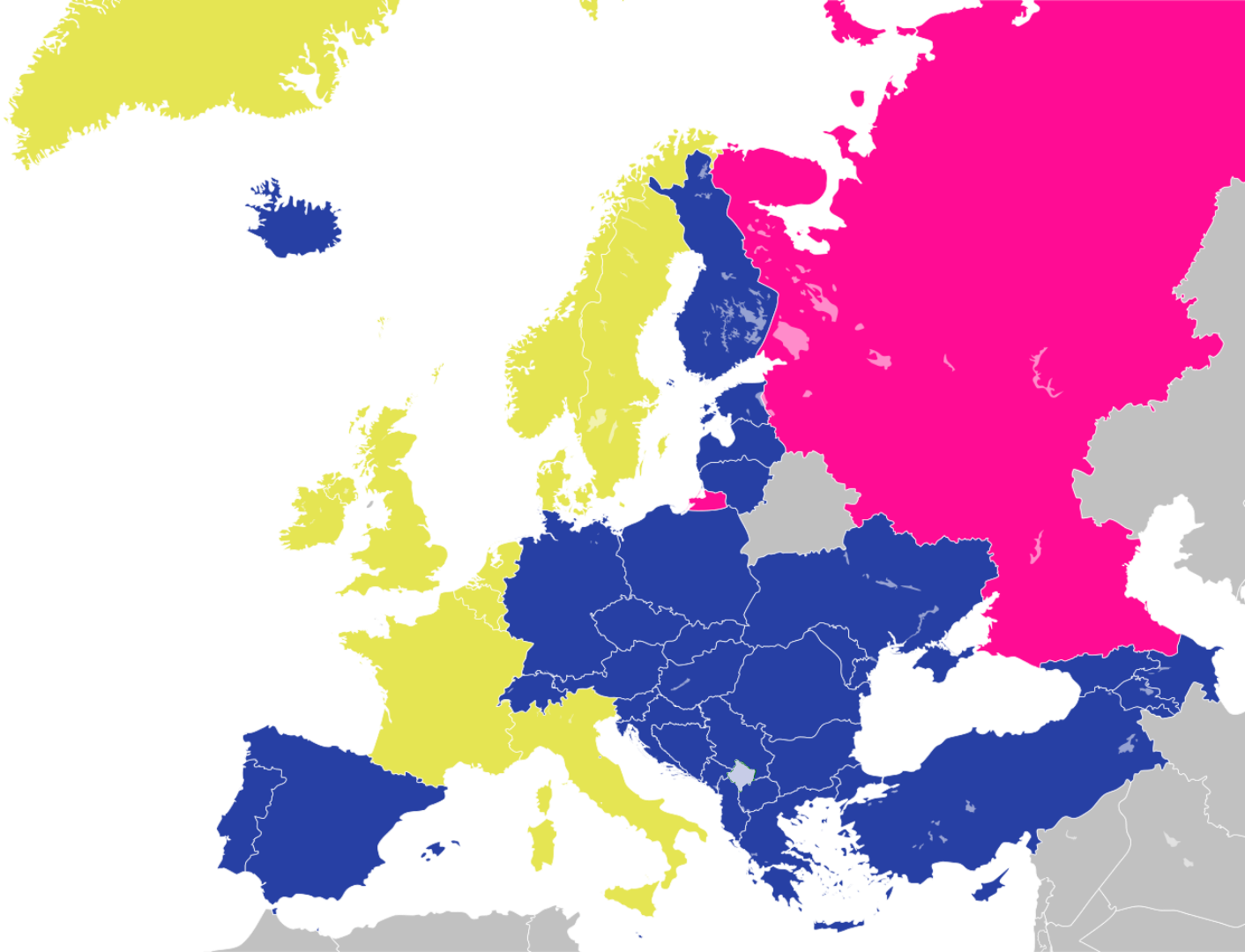
Council of Europe member states as of 16 March 2022. Founding member states Subsequent member states Former member states

The Council of Europe was founded on 5 May 1949 by ten western and northern European states, with Greece joining three months later, and Iceland, Turkey and West Germany joining the next year. It now has 46 member states, with Montenegro being the latest to join.

Article 4 of the Council of Europe Statute specifies that membership is open to any European country, provided they meet specific democratic and human rights standards. Nearly all countries with territory in Europe are members of the Council of Europe, with the exceptions of Belarus, Kazakhstan, Russia, and Vatican City, as well as states with limited recognition.

== List ==
State	Capital	Date joined	Notes
Netherlands	Amsterdam	5 May 1949	Founder
Belgium	Brussels	5 May 1949	Founder
Luxembourg	Luxembourg	5 May 1949	Founder
Denmark	Copenhagen	5 May 1949	Founder. Denmark includes the Faroe Islands and Greenland, but some Council of Europe conventions which Denmark participates in do not apply to these territories.
France	Paris	5 May 1949	Founder
Norway	Oslo	5 May 1949	Founder
Sweden	Stockholm	5 May 1949	Founder
United Kingdom	London	5 May 1949	Founder
Ireland	Dublin	5 May 1949	Founder
Italy	Rome	5 May 1949	Founder
Greece	Athens	9 August 1949	Withdrew from Council membership on 12 December 1969 due to the Greek case during the military dictatorship. After the fall of the junta, Greece re-joined the Council of Europe on 28 November 1974. See Greece in the Council of Europe.
Iceland	Reykjavík	7 March 1950	
Turkey	Ankara	13 April 1950	
Germany	Berlin	13 July 1950	The Federal Republic of Germany (West Germany) and the Saar Protectorate became associate members in 1950. The Federal Republic became a full member in 1951. The Saar acceded to the Federal Republic in 1957, and the states of the former East Germany became part of the Federal Republic upon reunification in 1990. East Germany had never been a member of the Council.
Austria	Vienna	16 April 1956	
Cyprus	Nicosia	24 May 1961	
Switzerland	Bern	6 May 1963	
Malta	Valletta	29 April 1965	
Portugal	Lisbon	22 September 1976	
Spain	Madrid	24 November 1977	
Liechtenstein	Vaduz	23 November 1978	
San Marino	San Marino	16 November 1988	
Finland	Helsinki	5 May 1989	
Hungary	Budapest	6 November 1990	
Poland	Warsaw	26 November 1991	
Bulgaria	Sofia	7 May 1992	
Estonia	Tallinn	14 May 1993	
Lithuania	Vilnius	14 May 1993	
Slovenia	Ljubljana	14 May 1993	
Czech Republic	Prague	30 June 1993	Previously a member of the Council as part of Czechoslovakia from 21 January 1991 to the latter's dissolution on 31 December 1992.
Slovakia	Bratislava	30 June 1993	Previously a member of the Council as part of Czechoslovakia from 21 January 1991 to the latter's dissolution on 31 December 1992.
Romania	Bucharest	7 October 1993	
Andorra	Andorra la Vella	10 November 1994	
Latvia	Riga	10 February 1995	
Moldova	Chișinău	13 July 1995	
Albania	Tirana	13 July 1995	
Ukraine	Kyiv	9 November 1995	
North Macedonia	Skopje	9 November 1995	Until 12 February 2019 called Republic of Macedonia, officially referred to as "the former Yugoslav Republic of Macedonia" due to a naming dispute.
Croatia	Zagreb	6 November 1996	
Georgia	Tbilisi	27 April 1999	
Armenia	Yerevan	25 January 2001	See Armenia in the Council of Europe
Azerbaijan	Baku	25 January 2001	See Azerbaijan in the Council of Europe
Bosnia and Herzegovina	Sarajevo	24 April 2002	
Serbia	Belgrade	3 April 2003	Originally joined as Serbia and Montenegro. After Montenegrin independence in 2006, the Committee of Ministers declared that the Republic of Serbia would continue the membership of the former State Union of Serbia and Montenegro.
Monaco	Monaco	5 October 2004	
Montenegro	Podgorica	11 May 2007	Previously a member of the Council as part of Serbia and Montenegro from 2003.

== Former members ==
State	Capital	Date joined	Date left	Notes
Russia	Moscow	28 February 1996	16 March 2022	See Russia in the Council of Europe. Suspended from its rights of representation in the Committee of Ministers and in the Parliamentary Assembly on 25 February 2022 due to the invasion of Ukraine. Russia announced that it would no longer participate in the organisation on 10 March 2022. On 15 March 2022, Russia launched a withdrawal procedure from the Council, delivering its formal notification to withdraw effective 31 December 2022. On 16 March 2022, the Committee of Ministers decided to expel Russia with immediate effect.

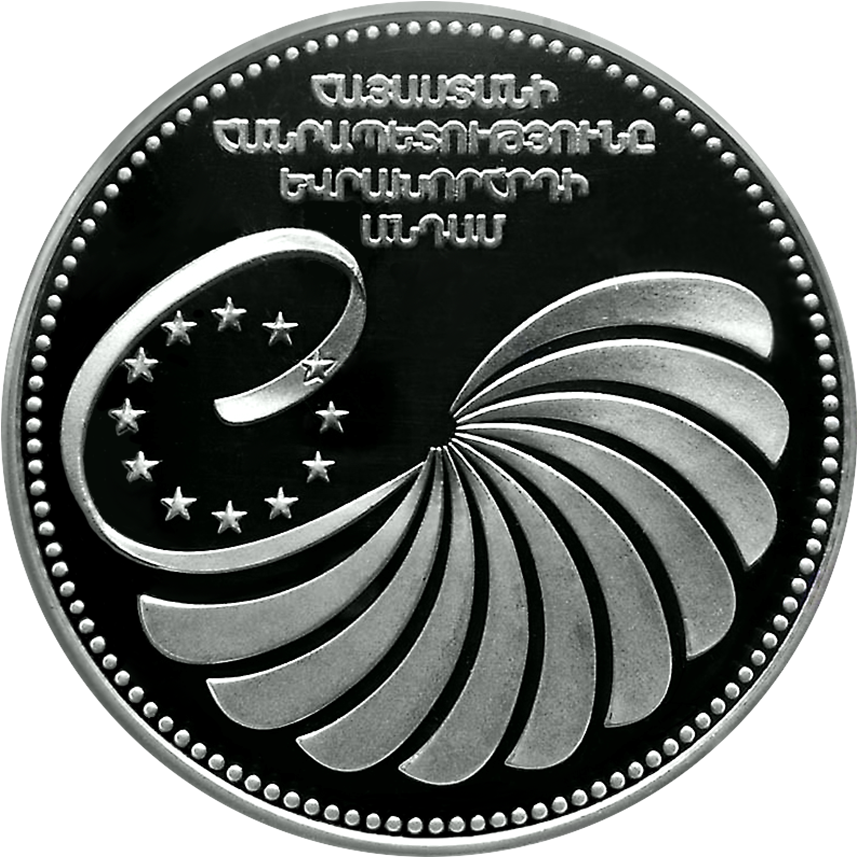
This coin was issued in Armenia to commemorate Armenia's accession to the Council in 2001.

== Dissolved members ==
State	Capital	Date joined	Date left	Notes
Saarland	Saarbrücken	13 August 1950	1 January 1957	Saarland joined West Germany on 1 January 1957.
(Czech Republic) Czechoslovakia	Prague	21 January 1991	31 December 1992	Dissolved on 31 December 1992; successor states Czech Republic and Slovakia rejoined the Council on 30 June 1993.
Serbia and Montenegro	Belgrade	3 April 2003	5 June 2006	Dissolved after Montenegrin independence in June 2006. Serbia was declared to continue the former union's seat on 14 June 2006; Montenegro joined 11 May 2007.

== Applicants ==
Special Guest status with the Parliamentary Assembly was established in 1989, as a provisional status in the accession process for parliaments of European non-member states, which applied for membership in the Council of Europe. The aim of the special guest status is to foster closer relations with the national parliaments of the European non-member states, by enabling the parliament concerned to be represented in, and work with, the Assembly, especially in determining the accession conditions.

=== Belarus ===
Belarus applied for full membership on 12 March 1993, and its parliament held special guest status with the Parliamentary Assembly from September 1992 to January 1997. The special guest status was however suspended as a consequence of the November 1996 constitutional referendum upholding the death penalty, and parliament by-elections which the CoE found to be undemocratic, as well as enforced limits on democratic freedoms such as freedom of expression (cf. Belarusian media) under the administration of President Alexander Lukashenko. A second change of the Belarus constitution in October 2004, moreover "does not respect minimum democratic standards and violates the principles of separation of powers and the rule of law". In June 2009, PACE decided that the suspension of the Belarusian parliament's special guest status in the Assembly would only be lifted conditional of the government imposing a moratorium on the death penalty. As of May 2013, this condition had not been met.

=== Kazakhstan ===
Kazakhstan applied for the Special Guest status with the Parliamentary Assembly in 1999. The Assembly found that Kazakhstan could apply for full membership, because 4% of its territory, west of the Ural river, is located in Europe, but granting Special Guest status would require improvements in the fields of democracy and human rights. Kazakhstan signed a co-operation agreement with the Assembly in April 2004.

In November 2006, the Kazakhstan Parliament officially asked to be granted observer status with the Assembly, which however was never granted due to requiring a pre compliance with all CoE core values and principles. The country acceded to the Council of Europe's European Cultural Convention on 24 February 2010. On 15 to 16 March 2010, the President of the Council of Europe's Parliamentary Assembly (PACE) made an official visit to Kazakhstan, resulting in the conclusion that the Council of Europe and Kazakhstan strengthen their relations. This milestone emboldens Kazakhstan's "Path to Europe" programme, as outlined by Kazakh president Nursultan Nazarbayev in Astana in 2008.

In December 2013, a joint declaration on enhancing co-operation between Kazakhstan and the Council of Europe in 2014–15, was signed with the purpose of paving the way for Kazakhstan's accession to the Council of Europe's multiple conventions in the field of criminal justice.

=== Kosovo ===
Kosovo became a member of the Council of Europe Development Bank in 2013 and a member of the Council of Europe's Venice Commission in 2014. The Assembly of Kosovo was invited to take part in the work of the Parliamentary Assembly of the Council of Europe and its committees as an observer in 2016. Two representatives of local government in Kosovo participate in the work of the Congress of Local and Regional Authorities as observers.

Hashim Thaçi, Kosovo's Minister of Foreign Affairs, stated in December 2014 that an application for membership of the Council of Europe was planned to be filed within the first quarter of 2015. On 12 May 2022 Foreign Minister Donika Gërvalla-Schwarz submitted the application for membership at a meeting with the Council's leadership in Strasbourg. Kosovo is already de facto under the jurisdiction of the European Court of Human Rights. On 20 March 2023, Kosovar prime minister Albin Kurti said during a meeting with foreign diplomats in Pristina, that as a result of the Ohrid Agreement, approved by Kosovo and Serbia two days earlier, the road for Kosovo to join the Council of Europe was now open.

On 24 April 2023, the Committee of Ministers of the Council of Europe approved Kosovo's application for membership with 33 votes in favour, 7 against and 5 abstentions, allowing the application to progress to the Parliamentary Assembly. Dora Bakoyannis of Greece was appointed as Rapporteur for Kosovo. Bakoyannis gave a statutory opinion at a meeting of the Committee on Political Affairs and Democracy of the Parliamentary Assembly of the Council of Europe on 27 March 2024. The opinion recommended that Kosovo be admitted as a "member" state of the council under Article 4 of its statute, as opposed to an "associate member" country under Article 5. It also stated that a footnote describing the status of Kosovo would no longer be required to be used within the work of the council and its associated bodies. The Committee on Political Affairs and Democracy agreed to accept the recommendation with 31 delegates voting in favour, four against and one abstention. On 15 April 2024, the Committee on Equality and Non-Discrimination supported Kosovo's application and the Committee on Legal Affairs and Human Rights confirmed that Kosovo met the legal definition of "European State" as defined by article 4 of the Statute of the Council of Europe and meets the criteria of statehood under international law. The following day, on 16 April 2024, the Parliamentary Assembly voted in favour of Kosovo's membership, with 131 votes in favour, 29 against and 11 abstentions.

The final approval of Kosovo's membership, however still requires the approval of the Council of Europe’s Committee of Ministers by a two-thirds majority vote. The “Quint” ambassadors (from France, Germany, Italy, United Kingdom and the United States) have stated that they would only table a proposal for a vote once Kosovo submitted a revised "Statute of the Association of Serb-Majority Municipalities" for review by the Constitutional Court of Kosovo. This condition was rejected by the Kosovo Prime Minister Albin Kurti in May 2024, leading the final vote to be postponed to a later unspecified date.

== Observers ==
Ten founding members Joined subsequently Former members Official candidates Observer at the Parliamentary Assembly Observer at the Committee of Ministers Observer at the Committee of Ministers and the Parliamentary Assembly

=== Vatican City ===
Despite being in Europe, Vatican City has never applied for Council of Europe membership, choosing to become an observer instead. However, there have been calls for it to apply to become a contracting party to the European Convention on Human Rights.

=== Other countries ===
Observer status was designed for non-European democracies willing to contribute to democratic transitions in Europe.

Canada, Japan, Mexico, the United States and the Holy See have observer status with the Council of Europe and can participate in the Committee of Ministers and all intergovernmental committees. They may contribute financially to the activities of the Council of Europe on a voluntary basis.

The parliaments of Canada, Israel and Mexico have observer status with the Parliamentary Assembly and their delegations can participate in assembly sessions and committee meetings. A delegation representing the Assembly of Kosovo has also been invited to participate the Parliamentary Assembly on an ad hoc basis. Representatives of the Palestinian Legislative Council may participate in Assembly debates concerning the Middle East as well as Turkish-Cypriot representatives from Northern Cyprus concerning the island.

There has been criticism concerning the observer status of Japan and the United States because both countries apply the death penalty. The Parliamentary Assembly has been lobbying for the United States and Japan to abolish the death penalty or lose their observer status. The council also voted to restore Special Guest status to Belarus, on condition that Belarus declares a moratorium on the death penalty.

== Partners ==
In May 2009, the Parliamentary Assembly established a new status for institutional co-operation with parliaments of non-member states in neighbouring regions wishing to be supported by the Parliamentary Assembly in their democratic transitions and to participate in the political debate on common challenges.

The new status is called "Partner for democracy" and interested states could obtain it if they commit to embrace the values of the Council of Europe such as pluralist democracy, the rule of law and respect for human rights and fundamental freedoms; to encourage a moratorium on executions and abolish the death penalty; to organise free and fair elections; to become party to the relevant CoE conventions; to utilise the expertise of the Assembly and the Venice Commission in its institutional and legislative work.

CoE has adopted the policy of dialogue with the neighbouring regions of the southern Mediterranean, the Middle East and Central Asia – based on respect for universal human rights. Following this policy the Assembly has already established working contacts with parliaments of neighbouring countries other than those of the CoE Observers: Algeria, Kazakhstan, Morocco, Tunisia and the Palestinian Legislative Council. Several of these parliaments have expressed interest in upgrading the status of the existing co-operation, and in establishing a relationship on a permanent basis.

Since 1994, parliaments of the countries bordering the Council of Europe member states have the possibility of concluding special co-operation agreements with the Assembly, but it has not generated much interest among the parliaments concerned, which suggests that it does not offer sufficient clarity and visibility. So far only the Kazakhstan Parliament had taken advantage of it since 2004.

In November 2006, the Kazakhstan Parliament officially asked to be granted observer status with the Assembly. Such formal or informal requests are made by a number of parliaments that are already co-operating with it but think that the institutionalised recognition of that co-operation could make it more visible, more coherent and more effective. However the observer status is considered inappropriate in these cases, as it requires that the state receiving it already complies with the CoE core values and principles, which is not the case for the states currently requesting it, who are in the early stages of democratic transition.

The newly established "Partner for democracy" status is similar to the co-operation initiatives of other intergovernmental organisations of mostly European states such as the European Neighbourhood Policy of the EU, the partners for co-operation of OSCE, the co-operation with non-member states of NATO.

The national parliaments eligible to request a "Partner for democracy" status are from the following countries:

- southern Mediterranean and Middle East participants in the Union for the Mediterranean: Mauritania, Morocco, Algeria, Tunisia, Egypt, Israel, Jordan, Syria, Lebanon, Palestine and possibly Libya (Libya is observer of the Union for the Mediterranean)
- Central Asian participants in the OSCE: Kazakhstan, Kyrgyzstan, Tajikistan, Turkmenistan and Uzbekistan
- other states if the Bureau of the Assembly so decides

As of 2024 the following parliaments have been accorded "Partner for democracy" status:

- Morocco – June 2011
- Palestinian National Council – 4 October 2011
- Kyrgyzstan – 8 April 2014
- Jordan - 26 January 2016
