= Bosphorus Airways v. Ireland =

Decision of the European Court of Human Rights

- Court: European Court of Human Rights
- Full case name: Bosphorus Hava Yolları Turizm ve Ticaret Anonim Şirketi v. Ireland
- Decided: 30 June 2005
- ECLI: ECLI:CE:ECHR:2005:0630JUD004503698

Court membership
- Judges sitting: Christos Rozakis; Jean-Paul Costa; Georg Ress; Nicolas Bratza; Ireneu Cabral Barreto; Françoise Tulkens; Viera Strážnická; Karel Jungwiert; Volodymyr Butkevych; Nina Vajić; John Hedigan; Matti Pellonpää; Kristaq Traja; Snejana Botoucharova; Vladimiro Zagrebelsky; Lech Garlicki; Alvina Gyulumyan

Case opinions
- No violation of Article 1 of Protocol No. 1
- Decision by: Rozakis, Tulkens, Traja, Botoucharova, Zagrebelsky, Garlicki
- Concurrence: Ress

Keywords
- protection of property

Bosphorus Hava Yolları Turizm ve Ticaret Anonim Şirketi v. Ireland, Application no. 45036/98 (30 June 2005), was a decision taken by the Grand Chamber of the European Court of Human Rights (ECtHR) which held that the Court's role is confined to ascertaining whether the effects of Member States' national adjudications are compatible with the European Convention on Human Rights.

If the level of protection for fundamental rights offered by an organization is comparable to the protection provided under the Convention (known as equivalent protection), than that organization is presumed to be in compliance with Convention requirements. Under this decision, a national measure required by EU law enjoys the presumption of equivalent protection with ECHR rights, unless a deficiency in protection is revealed. This presumption is called the "Bosphorus Presumption".

== Facts ==
Bosphorus v. Ireland concerns an application brought by Bosphorus Hava Yollari Turizm ve Ticaret Anonim Şirketi ("Bosphorus Airways"), an airline charter company registered in Turkey. The Bosphorus v. Ireland case takes place during the Yugoslav Wars of 1991–1994 which followed the collapse of Yugoslavia. On 17 April 1993, United Nations Security Council Resolution 820 stated that States would seize any aircraft on their territory "in which a person or enterprise of or operating from the [FRY] has a majority or preponderant interest". The United Nations economic sanctions against the warring ex-Yugoslav states were implemented by Community law (particularly EC Council Regulation 990/93). These resolutions were interpreted by the Irish authorities to require the seizure of all Yugoslav assets, including the planes leased by the Yugoslav state airline to Bosphorus Airways. The Irish authorities therefore seized an aircraft in May 1993 which was leased by Bosphorus from the Yugoslav state airline and had been in Ireland for maintenance. The ECtHR Registry press release published in 2005 after the ECtHR Grand Chamber delivered their judgement explains:

Bosphorus Airways' challenge to the retention of the aircraft was initially successful in the High Court, which held in June 1994 that Regulation 990/93 was not applicable to the aircraft. However, on appeal, the Supreme Court referred a question under Article 177 of the EEC Treaty to the European Court of Justice (ECJ) on whether the aircraft was covered by Regulation 990/93. The ECJ found that it was and, in its judgment of November 1996, the Supreme Court applied the decision of the ECJ and allowed the State's appeal. By that time, Bosphorus Airways' lease on the aircraft had already expired. Since the sanctions regime against the Federal Republic of Yugoslavia (Serbia and Montenegro) had also been relaxed by that date, the Irish authorities returned the aircraft directly to JAT [Yugoslav Airlines]. Bosphorus Airways consequently lost approximately three years of its four-year lease of the aircraft, which was the only one ever seized under the relevant EC and UN regulations.

== Judgement ==
The European Court of Human Rights, in the case of Bosphorus Airways v. Ireland, held unanimously that there had been no violation of Article 1 of Protocol 1 (protection of property) to the European Convention on Human Rights. The court recognized that the impoundment of Bosphorus Airways' aircraft by Irish authorities, as ordered by the Irish Minister for Transport, brought the airline under the jurisdiction of Ireland. The court certified that EC Regulation 990/93, which was binding and directly applicable in all member states, justified the impoundment. It emphasized that this action was a mandatory enforcement of EU law under Article 8 of EC Regulation 990/93 and not discretionary. The court concluded that the impoundment was justified as EC law provided protection of fundamental rights equivalent to the Convention system, asserting that Ireland did not deviate from Convention standards by enforcing this EU regulation.

The following excerpt from the ECHR Registry press release explains how the "Bosphorus Presumption" (as defined earlier) was formed and applied in the case:

The Court found that the protection of fundamental rights by EC law could have been considered to be, and to have been at the relevant time, "equivalent" to that of the Convention system. Consequently, a presumption arose that Ireland did not depart from the requirements of the Convention when it implemented legal obligations flowing from its membership of the EC. Such a presumption could be rebutted if, in a particular case, it was considered that the protection of Convention rights was manifestly deficient. In such cases, the interest of international co-operation would be outweighed by the Convention's role as a "constitutional instrument of European public order" in the field of human rights".

The court did not find that the protection of Bosphorus Airways' Convention rights was manifestly deficient, because of the general interest (political action against the Yugoslav War) pursued by the impoundment and by the sanctions regime and of the ruling of the EC. This led to the conclusion that "the presumption of Convention compliance had not been rebutted and that the impoundment of the aircraft did not give rise to a violation of Article 1 of Protocol No. 1."

== Joint concurring opinions ==
Both joint concurring opinions in Bosphorus Airways v. Ireland agree with the decision made by the majority of the court that there has been no violation of Article 1 of Protocol No.1, but do not agree with all steps in reasoning followed by the majority or all aspects of its analysis.

=== Joint concurring opinion of judges Rozakis, Tulkens, Traja, Botoucharova, Zagrebelsky and Garlicki ===
In this joint concurring opinion, the judges were not entirely convinced by the approach that was adopted in order to establish that "equivalent protection" exists between the EU and the Convention, particularly because when the decision was made in 2005 "it remains the case that the Union has no yet acceded to the European Convention of Human Rights and that full protection does not yet exist at the European level." They argued that the judgement minimizes or ignores certain factors which establish a genuine difference between rights and make it unreasonable to conclude that equivalent protection exists in every case.

First, they raised that while the ECJ's interpretation of Community law is binding to on the court which made the referral, the later court still has the power when deciding how to enact that ruling in practice. They suggested that there should be more exploration into how ECJ interpretations could impact other cases, especially those that might involve basic rights and freedoms and looking at whether the way the ECJ's rulings are implemented by national courts consistently protects people's rights as much as the European Court of Human Rights would to properly ensure "equivalent protection".

Second, they took issue with the fact that individuals' access to the court is limited. They stated that "the right of individual application is one of the basic obligations assumed by the States on ratifying the Convention. It is therefore difficult to accept that they should have been able to reduce the effectiveness of this right for persons within their jurisdiction on the ground that they have transferred certain powers to the European Communities."

While the judgement states that in concreto review is possible since the presumption could be rebutted if the protection of Convention rights was "manifestly deficient", the judges in the concurring opinion found that "manifestly deficient" is too low a threshold when compared to the ECHR's regular standards for supervision. The EU's Charter of Fundamental Rights, which at the time of this decision in 2005 had not yet come into force (it became legally binding with the coming into force of the Treaty of Lisbon on 1 December 2009), draws heavily from the ECHR. Its provisions are seen as morally binding, suggesting that rights recognized under the ECHR should have the same meaning and scope when applied in the EU context. However, even with the Charter of Fundamental Rights, the concurring judges feared creating a double standard where EU law applies less stringent standards than those of the ECHR, despite the overlap in rights and protections. This, they said, could lead to inconsistencies in how rights are upheld across different EU states, potentially causing inequality among states that are party to different international agreements.

=== Joint concurring opinion of Judge Ress ===
1. Judge Ress believed it was important for the EU to accede to the ECHR in order to make the control mechanism of the Convention complete. While he agreed with the conclusion of the judgement, he argued that to come to this conclusion "the whole concept of presumed Convention compliance by international organizations, particularly the European Community, was unnecessary and even dangerous for the future protection of human rights in the Contracting States when they transfer parts of their sovereign power to an international organization".
2. He disagreed with the Joint Concurring Opinion of Judges Rozakis, Tulkens, Traja, Botoucharova, Zagrebelsky and Garlicki that the judgement could be a step toward the creation of a double standard, because the presumption of Convention compliance should not exclude a case-by-case analysis by the Court to assess actual breaches of the Convention. He agreed with the main judgement that the European Community has an effective protection of fundamental rights, regardless of the limited access of individuals to the ECJ. He acknowledged that "a major part of the jurisprudence of the ECJ of the level and intensity of the protection of property rights and the application of Article 1 of Protocol No.1 is missing, but he thought that in the future the presumption of Convention compliance would be enriched in that area. However he believed that there was not already a presumption of Convention compliance just because of the mere formal system of protection. He said the Charter of Fundamental rights could also help this issue.
3. He argued that "manifestly deficient" protection includes scenarios where the ECJ is either not competent, overly restrictive in allowing individual access, or misinterprets or misapplies Convention guarantees. The protection level is expected to be "comparable" to that of the ECHR, and deficiencies are considered manifest if the ECJ deviates from established ECtHR jurisprudence on the interpretation or application of the Convention or its Protocols.
4. The principle of pacta sunt servanda (agreements must be kept) in international treaties does not imply that treaties between contracting parties to the Convention take precedence over the Convention itself. He stresses that international treaties and the establishment of international organizations must not take precedence over the Convention. It is recognized that while international cooperation is essential, it must not lead to the formation of international bodies that fail to align with the Convention's standards, ensuring that international treaties and organizations comply with ECHR requirements.

== Legal precedents ==
The doctrine of "equivalent protection" and the issue of transfer of power under Community law featured in Bosphorus Airways v. Ireland had appeared in the M&Co judgment of the EDH Commission (1990). In the Commission affirmed that "the transfer of powers to an international organisation is not incompatible with the Convention provided that within that organisation fundamental rights will receive an equivalent protection."

The case Matthews v. the United Kingdom is also an important precedent because "it was the first case in which the Court held that a Member State of the European Union was in breach of the Convention brought about by EU law. The violation was rooted in the EC Act on Direct Elections of 1976, a treaty concluded by all the EU Member States at the time." In Matthews, the court stated:

The Convention does not exclude the transfer of competences to international organisations provided that Convention rights continue to be 'secured'. Member States' responsibility therefore continues even after such a transfer.

Bosphorus was more complicated than Matthews because the violation was not of EU primary legislation, but EU secondary legislation (an act adopted by the organization itself), which meant it could be brought to the ECJ. In Matthews, contracting parties are responsible for violations of Convention rights only originating in the organization's constituent treaties, then in Bosphorus violations of Convention rights originating in acts or omissions by the organs of the organization are added to the scope. "While Matthews established that the Member States of the EU remain generally accountable for human rights violations caused by the law of the European Union, the Bosphorus decision was seen as an attempt to accommodate the autonomy of the EU legal order within the premise set out in Matthews. Furthermore, it was submitted that the judgment had to be viewed in the specific context of an EU accession to the Convention" and of the potential double standard created by the overlapping jurisdiction between the ECJ and the ECHR.

== Bosphorus presumption ==
The Bosphorus Presumption is the ECHR's presumption, established in Bosphorus Airways v. Ireland, that a national measure required by EU law generally enjoys the presumption of equivalent protection with ECHR rights. It was set when the ECtHR considered the human right protection afforded by the European Union to be equivalent to that of the Convention. The Court in Bosphorus Airways v. Ireland declared itself competent to verify the conformity of a national measure implementing a Community regulation with the Convention. The court stated that in the same way Member State's authorities can better interpret and apply their domestic law, and that the European Union Community's judicial organs can better interpret and apply Community law (Bosphorus Airways v. Ireland §143), basing its decision on the margin of appreciation left to states in the application of these regulations. This lays the groundwork for the Bosphorus Presumption which the court establishes in the following paragraphs §155–156:

155. In the Court's view, State action taken in compliance with such legal obligations is justified as long as the relevant organisation is considered to protect fundamental rights [...], in a manner which can be considered at least equivalent to that for which the Convention provides [...]. By "equivalent" the Court means "comparable"; any requirement that the organisation's protection be "identical" could run counter to the interest of international cooperation pursued [...]. However, any such finding of equivalence could not be final and would be susceptible to review in the light of any relevant change in fundamental rights protection.
156. If such equivalent protection is considered to be provided by the organisation, the presumption will be that a State has not departed from the requirements of the Convention when it does no more than implement legal obligations flowing from its membership of the organisation. However, any such presumption can be rebutted if, in the circumstances of a particular case, it is considered that the protection of Convention rights was manifestly deficient. In such cases, the interest of international cooperation would be outweighed by the Convention's role as a "constitutional instrument of European public order" in the field of human rights [...].
