= Azerbaijan in the Council of Europe =

International relation

Azerbaijan–Council of Europe relations
- Azerbaijan: Council of Europe

Azerbaijan has been a member of the Council of Europe, an international organization that focuses on strengthening democracy and human rights, since 2001. As a member, it has attracted attention for holding political prisoners, low implementation of verdicts of the European Court of Human Rights (ECtHR), and bribing Council of Europe parliamentarians to suppress negative information about its human rights record. In 2017, the Committee of Ministers launched the first ever infringement proceeding against Azerbaijan after it refused to release opposition politician Ilgar Mammadov after a 2014 ECtHR verdict that his imprisonment was unlawful. There has also been criticism of Azerbaijan's continued membership by those who believe its lack of human rights protection undermines the credibility of the Council of Europe.

== Accession ==
Azerbaijan was the 43rd country to join the Council of Europe on 25 January 2001, the same day as Armenia. The country signed the European Convention on Human Rights as a condition for membership. Another condition was the release of all political prisoners. Controversially, the OSCE had monitored Azerbaijan's 2000 elections and determined that they did not meet international standards. Only democracies are allowed to join the Council of Europe. At the time of accession, it was hoped that membership would improve Azerbaijan's democratic standards and adherence to human rights. Since joining the Council of Europe, Azerbaijan has not held an election deemed free and fair by international observers, typically involving fraud by the government. The country has been ruled continuously by Heydar Aliyev and his son Ilham Aliyev. Dispute with Azerbaijan over its holding of political prisoners, which Azerbaijan has denied, led the Council of Europe to develop a formal definition of who qualifies as a political prisoner. In 2014, Azerbaijan held more political prisoners than any other Council of Europe country, estimated at 142 the previous year.

== European Court of Human Rights ==
Implementation of leading cases from the last 10 years as of August 2021. No implementation is colored black while 100% implementation is white. Average implementation is 53%, with the lowest being Azerbaijan (4%) and Russia (10%) and the highest Luxembourg, Monaco, and Estonia (100%) and Czechia (96%).

As of 2021, Azerbaijan has the lowest rate of compliance of any Council of Europe member state with implementing leading judgements of the European Court of Human Rights from the last 10 years. Leading judgements are a subset of cases involving serious or systemic human rights violations and only 4% of such cases against Azerbaijan led to a rectification of the underlying human rights violation. Overall 47 leading ECtHR judgments against Azerbaijan have not been implemented.

=== Leading ECtHR cases concerning Azerbaijan (incomplete list) ===
- Farhad Aliyev v. Azerbaijan (2010–2015) a group of cases concerning the extrajudicial detention, or detention with a reasonable suspicion of criminal offense, of several Azerbaijani citizens including former government minister Farhad Aliyev.
- Mammadov v. Azerbaijan (2014) — opposition politician Ilgar Mammadov was imprisoned by Azerbaijan. In 2014, the ECtHR ruled that he was imprisoned for the ulterior purpose of preventing his participation in politics, violating ECHR articles 5 (right to liberty), 6 (right to a fair trial), and 18. After the verdict, Mammadov was not released for almost five years. Due to the lack of compliance, in 2017 the Committee of Ministers launched its first infringement procedure under ECHR Article 46(4). Shortly afterward, Mammadov was released but not exonerated. The Council of Europe ended the infringement proceedings in September 2020 following the Supreme Court of Azerbaijan acquitting Mammadov.
- Mammadli v. Azerbaijan (2018) — Violations of Article 5 and Article 18 due to the abuse of criminal law to target twelve human rights activists, including Anar Mammadli, arrested by Azerbaijan between 2013 and 2016.
- Religious Community of Jehovah's Witnesses v. Azerbaijan (2020) — Azerbaijan violated the freedom of expression of Jehovah's Witnesses by banning certain books from import.
- Makuchyan and Minasyan v. Azerbaijan and Hungary (2020) — Azerbaijan violated Article 14 and Article 2 over pardon for Ramil Safarov, convicted of an ethnically charged murder of an Armenian.
- Mirgadirov v. Azerbaijan (2020) — wrongful detention of journalist Rauf Mirgadirov

=== Other ECtHR cases concerning Azerbaijan (incomplete list) ===
- Badalyan v. Azerbaijan — an Armenian citizen who crossed the border and was imprisoned by Azerbaijan for 22 months and alleged mistreatment in custody. In 2021, the ECtHR ruled that Azerbaijan had violated Article 3 and Article 5.
- A. v. Azerbaijan (17184/18) and 24 other applications concern arbitrary arrest, ill-treatment, and forced medical examinations of LGBT people in Baku following 2017 police raids. These cases are being considered together pending a hearing at the ECtHR.

=== Interstate cases ===
In late 2020, both Armenia and Azerbaijan filed cases against each other related to the 2020 Nagorno-Karabakh war, Armenia v. Azerbaijan as well as Azerbaijan v. Armenia. The Grand Chamber of the European Court of Human Rights is to consider both cases.

== Committee for the Prevention of Torture ==
In 2018, the Council of Europe's Committee for the Prevention of Torture reported that torture and ill-treatment are "widespread and systematic" by Azerbaijan's law enforcement agencies. Physical and psychological violence are used to extract confessions, punish people for activism or being members of marginalized groups such as LGBT community or minority religions. The Azerbaijani government disagreed with these findings.

== Parliamentary Assembly of the Council of Europe ==
In the first few years of Azerbaijani membership in the Council of Europe, PACE passed multiple resolutions condemning Azerbaijan for holding political prisoners. Aliyev released hundreds. In 2001, Swiss politician Andreas Gross became the Council of Europe rapporteur for Azerbaijan. In 2006 he decided to challenge the credentials of Azerbaijan's PACE delegation on the grounds of vote-rigging and other violations of Council of Europe standards. By 100 votes to 67, PACE declined to sanction Azerbaijan.

According to a 2012 report from the European Stability Initiative, Azerbaijan's corrupt "caviar diplomacy" began shortly after it joined the Council of Europe in 2001 and accelerated after the younger Aliyev became president in 2003. PACE members were given expensive gifts (including silk carpets, gold, caviar, and money) and invited on trips to Baku, although not all voted in favor of Azerbaijan for corrupt reasons. In 2013, a critical report on political prisoners in Azerbaijan by German representative Christoph Strässer was voted down by 125 votes to 79 with 20 abstentions. Italian PACE representative Luca Volontè was paid to derail the report. Italian prosecutors investigated Volontè, and in 2021 he was sentenced to four years in prison for accepting €2 million ($2.43 million) in bribes from two Azerbaijani politicians. In 2014, Azerbaijan launched a crackdown on civil society.

In 2018, 13 members of the Parliamentary Assembly of the Council of Europe were expelled for accepting bribes from Azerbaijan. PACE's Independent Investigation Body investigated the allegations of corruption against Azerbaijan and came to the conclusion that the corruption succeeded in softening criticism of Azerbaijan's human rights record. Such "naming and shaming" is a crucial tactic in combating human rights violations.

In 2020 PACE passed a resolution urging Azerbaijan to release its political prisoners.

== Reputational cost of membership ==
Austrian political scientist Gerald Knaus charges that through violating human rights and maintaining its position in the Council of Europe, Azerbaijan "has managed to steal the soul of Europe’s most important human rights institution". Knaus states that the Council of Europe intended that membership would change Azerbaijan's human rights and democracy record, but instead Azerbaijan "captured" the Council of Europe, both by bribery of PACE members as well as continuing its membership in the organization while holding political prisoners and manipulated elections.

International law scholars Kanstantsin Dzehtsiarou and Donal K Coffey cite Azerbaijan as one of the Council of Europe member states that show "persistent and clear disregard of the values and aims of the CoE". Dzehtsiarou and Coffey conclude that ECtHR judgements are not effective in bringing about structural change if there is no political will to implement them in the member state. The fact that Azerbaijan remains a full member of the Council of Europe while ignoring ECtHR judgements and holding political prisoners can erode the credibility of the institution, one argument for sanctioning or expelling Azerbaijan.

== See also ==
- Foreign relations of Azerbaijan
- Azerbaijan–European Union relations
- Azerbaijan–NATO relations
- Azerbaijan–OSCE relations
- Human rights in Azerbaijan
- Member states of the Council of Europe
