= Member states of the Venice Commission =

Member Observer Special status or cooperation

Starting with 18 member states, all member states of the Council of Europe subsequently joined the Venice Commission in 2002. Since then, non-European states can also become full members. As of 2026, the commission counted 61 member states.

== Full members ==
The 18 founding members:

- Austria
- Belgium
- Cyprus
- Denmark
- Finland
- France
- Greece
- Ireland
- Italy
- Luxembourg
- Malta
- Norway
- Portugal
- San Marino
- Spain
- Sweden
- Switzerland
- Turkey

The 28 other member states of the Council of Europe:

- Albania
- Andorra
- Armenia
- Azerbaijan
- Bosnia and Herzegovina
- Bulgaria
- Croatia
- Czech Republic
- Estonia
- Georgia
- Germany
- Hungary
- Iceland
- Latvia
- Liechtenstein
- Lithuania
- Moldova
- Monaco
- Montenegro
- Netherlands
- North Macedonia
- Poland
- Romania
- Serbia
- Slovakia
- Slovenia
- Ukraine
- United Kingdom

Other member states (mostly outside of Europe), with their year of accession:

- Kyrgyzstan 2004
- Chile 2005
- South Korea 2006
- Morocco 2007
- Algeria 2007
- Israel 2008
- Brazil 2009
- Peru 2009
- Tunisia 2010
- Mexico 2010
- Kazakhstan 2012
- United States 2013 - President Donald J. Trump announced the withdrawal from the Venice Commission in January 2026. The country will formally withdraw from the organization on 31 December 2026.
- Kosovo 2014
- Costa Rica 2016
- Canada 2019

== Observers ==
Observer members include:

- Argentina
- Holy See
- Japan
- Uruguay

== Special status ==
Special co-operation status:

- European Commission
- Organization of American States (OAS)
- Organization for Security and Co-operation in Europe/ODIHR
- Palestinian National Authority
- South Africa

== Former members ==
Several states have left the Venice commission:

- Russia (1996-2022) - Expelled following its 2022 invasion of Ukraine.

== See also ==
- Council of Europe
