= Article 1 of the European Convention on Human Rights =

First article of the European Convention on Human Rights

Article 1 of the European Convention on Human Rights is the first article of the European Convention on Human Rights. It states that "The High Contracting Parties shall secure to everyone within their jurisdiction the rights and freedoms defined in Section I of this Convention".

== Jurisdiction ==
The "jurisdiction" of member states has been challenged several times at the Court, the principle question being to what extent jurisdiction is territorial in nature. The court has struck a path between recognising exceptions to the regional nature of the treaty and

In Loizidou v Turkey (Preliminary Objections) (1995) 20 EHRR 99 the European Court of Human Rights stated:

Bearing in mind the object and purpose of the Convention, the responsibility of a Contracting Party may also arise when as a consequence of military action - whether lawful or unlawful - it exercises effective control of an area outside its national territory. The obligation to secure, in such an area, the rights and freedoms set out in the Convention derives from the fact of such control whether it be exercised directly, through its armed forces, or through a subordinate local administration.

Therefore actions of Turkey in Turkish controlled Northern Cyprus were found to be covered by the Convention.

== Notable cases ==
- Loizidou v Turkey (see above)
- Issa v Turkey (2004) 41 EHRR 567 – the defendant could contest jurisdiction for the purposes of Article 1 on factual grounds notwithstanding that they had not made any objection on those grounds at the admissibility stage.
- Öcalan v Turkey (2005) 41 EHRR 985 – acts of Kenya (not a party to the Convention) within its territory at the request of Turkey could not be attributed to Turkey so as to establish jurisdiction.
- Banković v Belgium (2007) – jurisdiction is essentially territorial; in contrast to the situation in Loizidou the victims of an airstrike on Yugoslavia, an extra-territorial act, were not under the defendants' effective control, nor was there a lacuna in protection between contracting states to be avoided as Yugoslavia was not a party.
- Al-Skeini and others v United Kingdom (2011) – the UK exercised Article 1 jurisdiction in Basra province in relation to killings of civilians because it exercised relevant governmental functions between the deposition of the Ba'ath regime and establishment of the Iraqi Interim Government.
