= Russia in the Council of Europe =

1996–2022 membership of Russia

Russia–Council of Europe relations
- Russia: Council of Europe

Russia was a member of the Council of Europe, an international organization that focuses on the promotion of democracy and human rights, from 1996 to 2022. At the time of its accession, Russia did not meet the requirements of membership, but it was believed that joining would help Russia improve its record on democracy and human rights protection. In a 2019 paper published in the International & Comparative Law Quarterly, international law scholars Kanstantsin Dzehtsiarou and Donal K Coffey described Russia as showing "persistent and clear disregard of the values and aims of the CoE", including occupying other member states, sponsoring separatist movements, and ignoring judgements of the European Court of Human Rights. During its membership, Russia was suspended from voting rights on multiple occasions. After the Russian invasion of Ukraine, on 16 March 2022 the Committee of Ministers voted to expel Russia from the Council with immediate effect.

In 2026, PACE created a Platform for Dialogue with Russian Democratic Forces to "promote collaboration and address issues related to Russia's aggression against Ukraine."

== Accession ==
In 1989, the Parliamentary Assembly of the Council of Europe (PACE) granted the Supreme Soviet of the Soviet Union a special guest status, granting Soviet parliamentarians the right to attend but not vote. After the dissolution of the Soviet Union, President Boris Yeltsin worked for the Russian Federation to join the Council of Europe.

In 1992, the Committee of Ministers, the Council of Europe's executive, expressed support for eventual Russian membership when it met the requirements laid out in the Statute of the Council of Europe, namely pluralist parliamentary democracy and protection of rule of law and human rights.

In 1994, a commission appointed by PACE determined that Russia was unfit for membership, citing deficits in Russia's legal order, especially in the areas of "constitutional rights, freedom of movement, national minorities, political and religious freedoms, the death penalty, military conscripts, secret surveillance, and places of detention". PACE suspended Russia's membership application later that year in response to the First Chechen War, citing "the indiscriminate and disproportionate use of force by the Russian military", which it declared to be contrary to the Council of Europe's values.

Russia signed the European Convention on Human Rights, the United Nations Convention Against Torture and the European Charter of Local Self-Government in 1996 and ratified the first on 5 May 1998. Russia joined the Council of Europe on 28 February 1996. The Council noticed favourably the entry into force around the same time of the Civil Code of Russia and Criminal Code of Russia. At the time, Irina Busygina and Jeffrey Kahn wrote, "No serious observer believed that Russia met the criteria for membership". Relaxation of standards also characterized the accession of other countries including Ukraine, Romania, and Croatia. British delegate David Atkinson argued that Russia could be suspended if it did not meet its obligations.

On its accession to the Council of Europe the Russian Federation entered into a number of commitments. The report on the Honouring of obligations and commitments by the Russian Federation dated 2 June 1998 is of interest here.

== Timeline of membership ==
=== 1996–2005 ===
Implementation of leading cases from the last 10 years as of August 2021. No implementation is colored black while 100% implementation is white. Average implementation is 53%, with the lowest being Azerbaijan (4%) and Russia (10%) and the highest Luxembourg, Monaco, and Estonia (100%) and Czechia (96%). Belarus is not a member.

The argument for admitting Russia to the Council of Europe rested on the belief that membership would lead it to change its behavior in line with the Council of Europe's fundamental values. Initially there was great optimism, and Russia changed several laws to bring them into compliance with Council of Europe requirements, at least on paper.

There was also the belief that - by extending the protection of the European Court of Human Rights to Russia's citizens, a consequence of its membership - human rights in Russia could be improved. It was argued that, whatever the shortcomings of Russia's national justice system, Strasbourg could act as a "last hope of justice" for Russians. Indeed, the effect of membership on Russia's human rights record has been judged successful in some individual cases brought to the European Court of Human Rights (ECtHR), when they are low-profile and not politically sensitive.

=== 2006 ===
The Advisory Committee on the Implementation of the Framework Convention for the Protection of National Minorities formulated its opinion on Russia's second periodic report.

In February, the EU Commissioner for Human Rights visited Chechnya, on which he presented a report in March.

The European Commission against Racism and Intolerance published its third periodic report on Russia in May. In December, it made a special statement on the situation of people of Georgian origin in the Russian Federation.

==== Resolutions condemning crimes of totalitarian regimes ====
The idea of condemning the crimes of totalitarian regimes at the international level was presented back in 2003 at the Council of Europe by René van der Linden (Netherlands), who later became the Chairman of PACE.

In September 2005, Göran Lindblad (Sweden) presented a revised report on "The need for the international community to condemn the crimes of communism" to the PACE political commission. According to Lindblad, the corresponding resolution was supposed to restore historical justice by condemning the crimes of communist regimes, just as the crimes of fascism were condemned in Nuremberg.

Russian politicians perceived the resolution as an insult to Russia and an attempt to revise history. Foreign communists and socialists also expressed their indignation that Lindblad sought to condemn not merely the crimes of communist regimes, but the communist ideology itself. As a result of difficult debates, the report was partially changed. In the title of the proposed resolution, instead of "crimes of communism," the wording used was "crimes of totalitarian communist regimes".

In parallel, work began on reports condemning the Franco regime in Spain and on the danger of a revival of the ideology of Nazism (presented by Mikhail Margelov).

On 25 January, the PACE adopted a resolution on "the need for international condemnation of the crimes of totalitarian communist regimes" (resolution 1481).

99 parliamentarians voted for the resolution, 42 voted against. The Russian delegation to PACE (mainly consisting of the Communist Party of the Russian Federation, United Russia, and Rodina), despite ideological differences, united in the fight against the adoption of the resolution. The only member of the Russian delegation who supported the resolution was the Liberal Democratic Party of Russia leader Vladimir Zhirinovsky.

The resolution on the Franco regime was adopted by the PACE Standing Committee on 17 March 2006, and the resolution on preventing the revival of Nazism on 12 April 2006. Russian deputies believe that in this way, a balance was achieved: the condemnation of the crimes of communist regimes was accompanied by confirmation of the PACE position on the inadmissibility of any totalitarian regimes.

=== 2007–2022 ===
By 2008, more than 25 percent of ECtHR cases concerned Russia, clogging the court's docket and creating a backlog. The flood of cases, many of which resulted in judgements against Russia, revealed systematic flaws in Russian protection of human rights. Although in some cases Russia made reforms to address the underlying issues, it was more common for the state to simply pay the complainants without any reform.

Since 2000, the country experienced autocratization and a decline in freedoms, accompanied with increasing distance from the Council of Europe. Russia has carried out wars of aggression against other Council of Europe member states: in 2008, it invaded Georgia; in 2014, it launched conflicts in parts of Ukraine and annexed Crimea; and in 2022 it began a full-scale invasion of Ukraine.

In a 2019 paper, international law scholars Kanstantsin Dzehtsiarou and Donal K Coffey cited Russia as one of the Council of Europe member states that show "persistent and clear disregard of the values and aims of the CoE". Dzehtsiarou and Coffey concluded that ECtHR judgements are not effective in bringing about structural change if there is no political will to implement them in the member state. The fact that Russia remained a full member of the Council of Europe while occupying other member states, ignoring ECtHR judgements, and sponsoring separatist movements had the potential to erode the credibility of the institution.

== Suspensions and expulsion ==
Russia was suspended from voting rights in PACE from 2000 to 2001 because of the Second Chechen War. After the Russian annexation of Crimea and Russian invasion of the Donbas region of Ukraine, PACE condemned Russia's war of aggression and demanded its withdrawal in a nonbinding resolution. The assembly also suspended some of Russia's voting privileges. To avoid the potential of exclusion, Russia's delegation did not attend in 2016, 2017, or 2018; Russia also withheld its membership dues. In 2019, the suspension was dropped. Many human rights activists in Russia argued against Russia's expulsion in order to preserve the right of Russians to petition the ECtHR in response to government abuses. The Secretary General of the Council of Europe Thorbjørn Jagland told the Financial Times that a Russian expulsion "will be a negative development for Europe, because we will have a Europe without Russia. It would be a big step back for Europe".

On 25 February 2022, a day after Russia invaded Ukraine, 42 of 47 member states voted to immediately suspend Russia's voting privileges in both PACE and the Committee of Ministers. The only country besides Russia to vote against was Armenia; Serbia and Azerbaijan did not attend and Turkey abstained. According to human rights scholar Kanstantsin Dzehtsiarou, the large-scale invasion of one Council of Europe state by another was unprecedented and the vote against Russia was a sign that almost all member states no longer want Russia in the Council of Europe. The only other member state to leave the institution was Greece, in 1969, as a result of the Greek case (Greece later rejoined after a democratic transition). On 15 March, hours before a vote on its expulsion, Russia filed a notice of voluntary withdrawal from the Council of Europe; its membership was due to terminate on 31 December 2022. However, as the procedure was already under way, the note had no legal effect, and on 16 March, the Committee of Ministers decided to expel Russia with immediate effect.

After Russia's expulsion, former President and Prime Minister Dmitry Medvedev endorsed restoring the death penalty in Russia.

== See also ==
- Human rights in Russia
