= Azerbaijan–OBSEC relations =

The relationship between Azerbaijan and Organization of the Black Sea Economic Cooperation (OBSEC) dates back to 1992 when Azerbaijan signed Istanbul Summit Declaration and the Bosphorus Statement.

== Background ==
Black Sea Economic Cooperation was formed according to the Istanbul Summit Declaration and the Bosphorus Statement signed on 25 June 1992 by the Heads of State and Government of the countries in the region. BSEC gained international legal identity when it was transformed into a full-fledged organization - the Organization of the Black Sea Economic Cooperation on May 1, 1999 after its Charter entered into force.

The Organization has 12 member states (Albania, Armenia, Azerbaijan, Bulgaria, Georgia, Greece, Moldova, Romania, Russia, Serbia, Turkey, and Ukraine) cooperating on various areas like agriculture, finance, education, culture, tourism, trade, transport, energy, and healthcare. Council of Ministers of Foreign Affairs is the main decision-making organ. The Heads of the member countries meet generally every 5 years in the Summit Meetings.

== History of relations ==
Azerbaijan is one of the founding members of the OBSEC and since 25 June 1992. Azerbaijan collaborates with the organization's member states on trade, customs, transport, energy, environment, information and communications, science and technology issues based on mutual interest.

Due to the ongoing conflict in Nagorno-Karabakh region, Azerbaijan started to actively participate in the work of OBSEC after ceasefire was declared. The President of Azerbaijan attended in the Summit of OBSEC on 25 October 1996 for the first time and signed Moscow Declaration. President Heydar Aliyev addressed the business conference on “New opportunities to Black Sea Region” on April 28, 1997 in Istanbul. He also attended the Meeting of Head of the States held in Yalta (1998), and in Istanbul (1999 and 2002). During these events, he met with the presidents of member states and discussed mutual relations on different issues.

During the period of 1992-2003, relations between OBSEC and Azerbaijan were more advisory, but since 2003 the relations have been characterized by the development of cooperation in specific areas. The relations with OBSEC are developing at a low pace because conflicts between member states (Azerbaijan-Armenia, Russia-Georgia, Greece-Turkey) and economic crisis have weakened inter-institutional integration processes.

President Ilham Aliyev accepted General Secretary of OBSEC Valeri Chechelashvili in November 2003, ministers of education of member states in April 2004, Secretary General Tedo Japaridze in February 2006, Leonidas Chrysanthopoulos in June 2006. On June 25, 2007, President Ilham Aliyev participated in the Summit of the Heads of States of the BSEC Member States dedicated to the 15th anniversary of the organization.

Delegation of Milli Majlis visited Georgia to attend 42nd Meeting of PABSEC in December 2013. During this visit, extending cooperation among member states, improving agriculture in the region, causes of global climate change, considering possible options to eliminate harmful effects of this process were discussed.

In September 2013, the 41st meeting of PABSEC Committee on Economy, trade, technology and ecology was held in Ganja with the participation of representatives of Bulgaria, Georgia, Romania, Russia, Serbia, Turkey, Ukraine, and Greece. MP Musa Guliyev was appointed as the head of PABSEC Committee on Economy, trade, technology and ecology.

== Overview of relations ==
Azerbaijan is represented in the related bodies of the OBSEC, as in the Board of Directors and Board of Governors of the Black Sea Trade and Development Bank.

The Secretary General of PABSEC is Asaf Hajiyev, representative of Azerbaijan since 2015 January 1.

Azerbaijan performed Country-Coordinator of the Working Group on Energy (2005-2007), Customs Matters, Science and Technology (2014-2016).

Azerbaijan participates in the Black Sea Ring Highway project aimed at developing Black Sea region and strengthening cooperation between member states.

High Level Forum on attracting the private sector to Agro-food chain development was held in Baku in February 2014 organized by OBSEC Business Council, National Confederation of Entrepreneurs Organizations of Azerbaijan, and FAO, supported by Ministry of Economy and Ministry of Agriculture.

== Chairmanship of Azerbaijan ==
Azerbaijan hold Chairmanship in the Organization in May 2003, in the end of the term, Azerbaijan’s chairmanship was extended for the next period (2003 October – 2004 April). Azerbaijan hold Chairmanship on May 1 – November 2009 according to the decision adopted at the 20th Meeting of the Council of Ministers of Foreign Affairs on 15–16 April 2009. During the period of chairmanship to OBSEC, Azerbaijan organized meetings of ministers of energy (18-19 September 2003), transport (1-3 October 2003), and tourism (25-26 September 2003). Besides, Azerbaijan hosted 9th and 11th meetings of the Council of Foreign Ministers of OBSEC. Serbia (formerly Serbia and Montenegro) ratified the Charter of the OBSEC and became the 12th member of the organization during the chairmanship of Azerbaijan in 2004.

During the presidency, the Azerbaijani state also attached special importance to simplifying trade in the Black Sea region and the development of small and medium-sized businesses. The two agreements on simplifying visa issues for businessmen and professional drivers in the region and the elimination of non-tariff barriers were discussed in various BSEC working groups to facilitate trade turnover. Azerbaijan also initiated to organize meetings of the Working Group on SMEs and seminars in order to develop small and medium-sized businesses in the region and to discuss the role of the states in this issue. Additionally, the project on improving the beekeeping in the Caucasus was established.

Manual of Operations for Project Development Fund was adopted by the 10th Council held in Baku on April 30, 2004. The first PDF Application was presented at the Meeting of the Working Group on Transport organized in Baku on October 1–2, 2003 and it was confirmed by the Council of Ministers of Foreign Affairs in Baku during their meeting held on April 30, 2004.

During the chairmanship of Azerbaijan, PDF Steering Committee held its first and two extraordinary meetings. During the period of coordinating Working Group on Energy, Azerbaijan conducted meetings of ministers of energy and transport. Baku Declarations were adopted in both of the meetings. On the other hand, in order to develop the cooperation in tourism a conference on tourism potential in Black Sea region was held in Baku on 25 September 2003, as well as organized seminars on tourism in different cities of member states. In April 2004, Meeting of Education Ministers was held in Baku with the support of the International Center for Black Sea Studies. In the end of the meeting Baku Declaration was adopted mentioning about future development of cooperation on educational and scientific spheres.

== Projects ==
=== Ongoing projects ===
- BLACK SEA HORIZON (BSH) Project 2015-2018 - Science Development Foundation under the President of the Republic of Azerbaijan.

=== Completed projects ===
- S&T International Cooperation Network for Central Asian and South Caucasus Countries (IncoNet CA/SC) - National Academy of Sciences of Republic of Azerbaijan (2010-2013);
- Networking on Science and Technology in the Black Sea Region project – Presidium of Azerbaijan National Academy of Sciences (January 2009 – December 2012).

== See also ==
- Organization of the Black Sea Economic Cooperation
- Foreign relations of Azerbaijan
- Azerbaijan and GUAM relations
