= Bernard Fassier =

French diplomat

Bernard Fassier is a French diplomat, one of the current 3 co-chairmen of the OSCE Minsk Group.

Fassierce graduated from the Saint-Cyr Military Academy and Senior War College. He has a degree from the Institut national des langues et civilisations orientales in Russian language and from the Institut d'Études Politiques de Paris in International Relations.

Fassier finished his military career in 1986 as the Head of Operations and Training Department of the French Military Government in West Berlin and joined the French Foreign Service in 1987. He held the position of Vice Director for the USSR (1987–1990), and worked in the French Embassies in Switzerland (1990–1993), Georgia (1993–1997) and Belarus (1997–2002). In August 2002 he was appointed Senior Deputy High Representative of High Representative for Bosnia and Herzegovina and Head of Rule of Law Unit. As the head of 'Rule of Law' pillar he was responsible for the restructuring of the Bosnia and Herzegovina's judicial system. In 2004 Bernard Fassier became one of the co-chairmen of the OSCE Minsk Group, representing France.
