= Azerbaijan and Organization for Economic Co-operation =

Intergovernmental organization

The Organization for Economic Co-operation is an intergovernmental organization established in 1985 with cooperation of Turkey, Iran and Pakistan. The main goal of this organization is to achieve sustainable economic development, promote trade, integrate to the world economy and develop efficient transport systems. Azerbaijan joined the organization in 1992. From August 2012 till 2016, the Secretary General of ECO was a representative from Azerbaijan.

== History ==
First, Regional Cooperation for Development was found in 1964 by Iran, Pakistan and Turkey. In 1985 it was renamed as “ECO”. After the collapse of Soviet Union in 1992, Afghanistan, Kazakhstan, Kyrgyz Republic, Tajikistan, Turkmenistan and Azerbaijan joined the organization. Altogether the states formed one of the biggest regional blocks in Asia. ECO member have been cooperating to accelerate regional development.

== Cooperation with Azerbaijan ==
The Republic of Azerbaijan participates in the process of liberalization of economy within OIC (Organization of Islamic Cooperation). Azerbaijan signed agreements such as “Framework Agreement on Trade Cooperation among ECO member states”, “Agreement on Transit Transport in the ECO Region”, “Agreement on Promotion and Protection of Investment in the ECO Region”. The purpose of these agreements is to strengthen economic cooperation among member states and development of internal trade. During the 21st meeting of Council of Ministers, the decision about foundation of ECO Research Center in Baku was approved.

In 2013 the Gazvin – Rasht – Astara Iran – Astara Azerbaijan railway project was convened. In 2013 and 2014 the first and second Baku forms of ECO member states were held. Economic intellectuals came together and discussed issues of economic growth and cooperation.

Azerbaijan proposed a new strategy for energy cooperation. Now together with its partners, Azerbaijan is realizing Southern Gas Corridor project that costs 40 billion dollars. The project will create thousands of new jobs in the region and strengthen friendship and cooperation among member states.

== Meetings held in Azerbaijan ==
In 2012 on May 2 and 3 AZPROMO organized the second meeting of the leaders of the Trade Promotion Organizations of the ECO member states in Baku. The seventh meeting on July 16–17 in 2012 was also held in Baku. 9th summit of ECO was held in Baku. On October 16, 2012 Baku hosted the 12th ECO Summit. A 2-year chairmanship was passed to Azerbaijan. In 2017 the 3rd meeting of leaders of anti-corruption organizations and ombudspersons of ECO was held in Baku.

== 12th Summit of ECO ==
During the summit, Ilham Aliyev said: "We are collaborators and the organizers of several international and regional projects and we want to increase the number of concrete projects within the Economic Cooperation Organization very much. We have to address the research issues to the concrete and take all measures necessary for the strides process". Aliyev noted that he paid great attention to the successful operation of ECO. Also he noted that the trade turnover between Azerbaijan and other ECO counties has increased by more than 20% from 2011 (in 2011 turnover was 28%) to 2012. After summit, special issue of ECO journal “ECO Chronicle” was published which was dedicated to the Republic of Azerbaijan. It included articles about Heydar Aliyev, major points from the speech of Ilham Aliyev during the 11th Summit of ECO and the speech of Elmar Mammadyarov during the 19th meeting of Ministerial Council of ECO, oil strategy and development of tourism in Azerbaijan.

== See also ==
- Economic Cooperation Organization
