= European Stability Initiative =

Think tank focusing on South East Europe

The European Stability Initiative (ESI) is a think tank focusing on South East Europe and enlargement of the European Union. It has offices in Berlin, Brussels and Istanbul.

== History ==
The ESI was founded in June 1999 in Sarajevo. Its founders, multi-national practitioners and analysts, were members of international organisations like the OSCE, the United Nations or the World Bank. It was founded as a research network to advance the integration of the Balkans into the European Union following the end of the Kosovo War. ESI's founding chairman is Gerald Knaus. In 2000, ESI opened its first offices, in Berlin and Brussels. In 2004, ESI opened an office in Istanbul and launched its first initiatives on Turkey's social and economic developments in the context of EU accession.

In June 2007, ESI began to work on a documentary series called “Balkan Express/Return to Europe”. The films cover the stories of people fighting for democratic values in ten countries (Albania, Kosovo, Montenegro, Bosnia-Herzegovina, Macedonia, Serbia, Romania, Bulgaria, Greece, and Turkey). From April 2008 onwards, the films were broadcast, first on the German language channels 3sat and ORF and then on television worldwide. In late 2008, Return to Europe was awarded the "Erasmus Euro Media Grand Award" for outstanding European media production by the European Society for Education and Communication (ESEC). ESEC Chairman Thomas A. Bauer noted that the series "combined inspired directing with sound scientific research".

Between 2012 and 2016, ESI focused its research on the human rights situation in Azerbaijan, EU enlargement methodology, the EU approach to economic issues in the Western Balkan countries and the Syrian refugee crisis.

During the 2015 European migrant crisis, ESI employees developed the 'Merkel Plan' (EU-Turkey agreement of 18 March 2016), a programme under which between two and five hundred thousand Syrian refugees would be transported directly from Turkey to Germany in order to relieve the pressure on Turkey. At the same time, a repatriation agreement with Turkey would be implemented and all refugees reaching Europe via the Aegean Sea or the Turkish-Greek border would be deported to Turkey. Parts of the plan were implemented in the Turkey agreement of 18 March 2016. At an event in March 2016, ESI Director Gerald Knaus emphasised that cooperation with Turkey was 'without alternative' in order to prevent an 'Orbánisation' of the EU. After the failed coup attempt in Turkey, he warned of a failure of the EU-Turkey agreement. He admitted that only 468 people had been sent back to Turkey since 20 March 2016. In 2017, the ESI published a 'Malta Plan' in which the current regulation would be replaced by a common European border and asylum system. Combined with repatriation agreements, the plan would stabilise irregular migration at a low level of around 100,000 people per year without disregarding the Geneva Refugee Convention.

In November 2021, the Swedish International Development Cooperation Agency (SIDA) published the "Evaluation of the European Stability Initiative (ESI) Project 2015-2021" which recommended that SIDA continue to fund the ESI and its efforts.

== Work ==
ESI is a non-profit organisation and is financed by donations. As of 2013, its projects on EU enlargement, capacity building, and human rights were funded by the Swedish International Development Cooperation Agency, Stiftung Mercator, the Open Society Foundations, and ERSTE Stiftung. In 2006, the ESI had a monthly budget of 45,000 euro. In 2013, the ESI had produced more than 62 reports.
