= Gerald Knaus =

Austrian social scientist

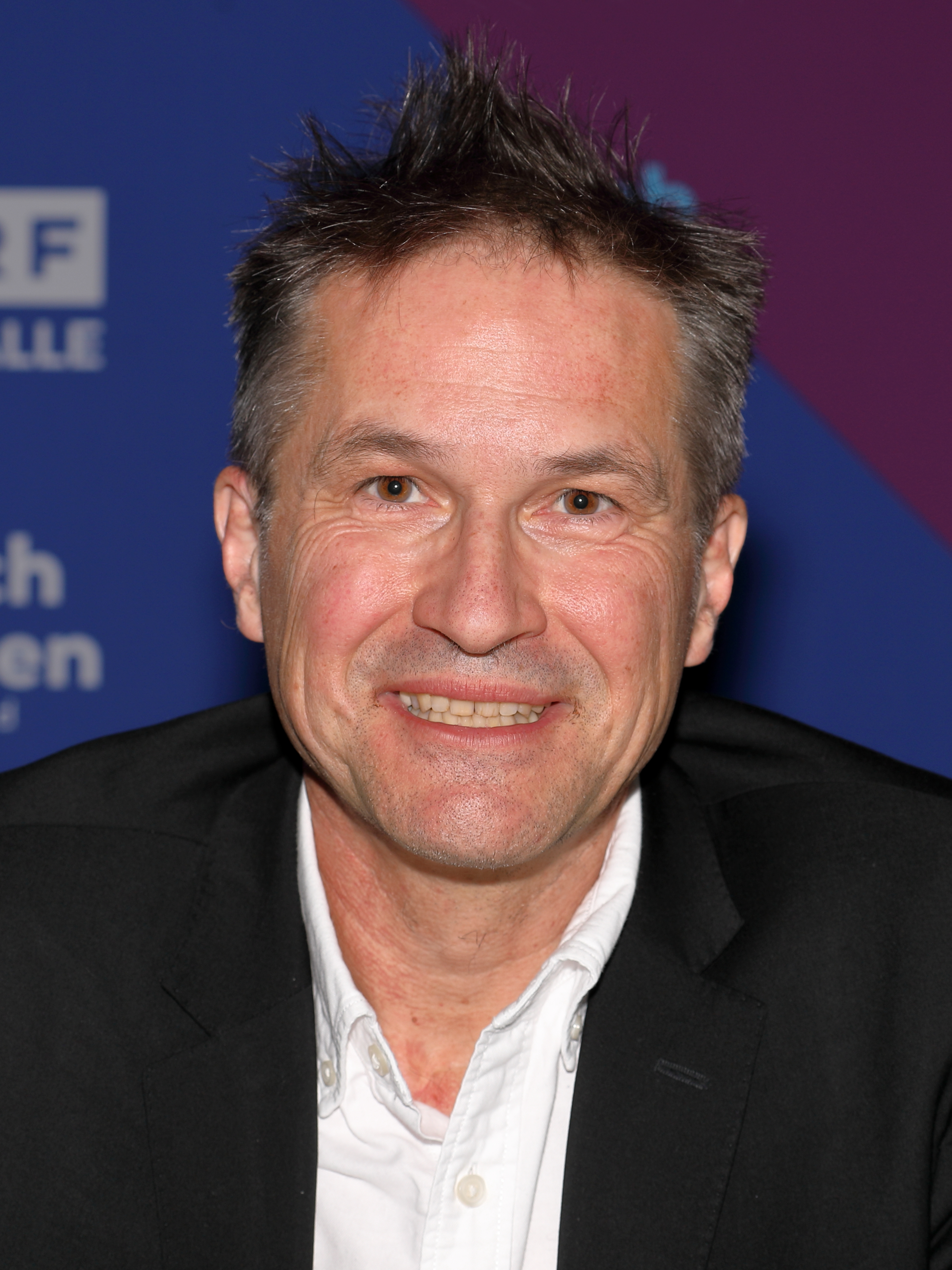
Knaus in 2025

Gerald Knaus (born 17 June 1970) is an Austrian social scientist. He is a co-founder of the think tank European Stability Initiative (ESI).

== Early life and education ==
Knaus was born in Bramberg am Wildkogel, Austria in 1970. He studied philosophy, political science and economics in Oxford, Brussels and Bologna.

== Career ==
In 1999, Knaus co-founded the European Stability Initiative, a liberal think tank known for its migration concepts, in Sarajevo. Today, the ESI has offices in Berlin, Brussels, and Vienna and Istanbul.

He taught economics at the Chernivtsi University in Ukraine and worked for five years for various NGOs and international organisations in Bosnia. He was director of the Lessons Learned and Analysis Unit (LLA) of the EU department of UNMIK in Kosovo (2001–2004). He is a founding member of the European Council on Foreign Relations and was an associate fellow at the Carr Center for Human Rights Policy at the Harvard Kennedy School of Governance in the US for five years, where he also taught state-building and intervention.

Knaus was among the members of the Schengen White List Project in 2009 that signed an open letter requesting that the EU allow visa liberalization for Kosovo.

In August 2011, he and co-author Rory Stewart published the book “Can Intervention Work?”.

From September 2018 to June 2019, Knaus was a visiting fellow at the Institute for Human Sciences in Vienna and in 2016/2017 a Mercator-IPC Senior Fellow in Istanbul.

Knaus is a co-initiator and co-negotiator of the 2016 refugee pact between Turkey and the EU.

In 2019, he was appointed by Federal Minister for Economic Cooperation and Development Gerd Müller to serve on a commission in charge of drafting recommendations on how to address the causes of displacement and migration.

In 2020 he published the book "Welche Grenzen brauchen wir?" ("What Borders Do We Need?") on the future of asylum and migration policy.

Knaus has worked for various international organizations and NGOs such as the International Mediator, the International Crisis Group and the Office of the High Representative.

On 28 October 2021, the German Federal Academy for Security Policy awarded Gerald Knaus with the Karl Carstens Award 2021.

In October 2025, Gerald Knaus and his daughter Francesca Knaus published their co-authored book Welches Europa brauchen wir? (What kind of Europe do we need?).

== Views ==
In 2024 Knaus argued in favor of externalizing asylum procedures to safe third countries as an alternative to the EU-Libya model while Judith Kohlenberger criticized Knaus's position.

== Other activities ==
- Centre for Economic and Foreign Policy Studies (EDAM), Member of the Advisory Board

== Personal life ==
Gerald Knaus lives in Berlin.
