= Protocol 14 to the European Convention on Human Rights =

Protocol on judicial procedure adopted in 2010

Protocol 14 of the European Convention on Human Rights entered into force on 1 June 2010, three months after it was ratified by all 47 contracting states to the convention. Between 2006 and 2010, Russia was the only contracting state to refuse to ratify Protocol 14. In 2010, Russia ended its opposition to the protocol, in exchange for a guarantee that Russian judges would be involved in reviewing complaints against Russia.

Protocol 14 led to reforms in three areas: The court's filtering capacity was reinforced to deal with clearly inadmissible applications, new admissibility criteria were introduced so that cases where the applicant has not suffered a significant disadvantage would be declared inadmissible, and measures were introduced to deal more effectively with repetitive cases.

Protocol 14 amended the convention so that judges would be elected for a non-renewable term of nine years, whereas previously judges served a six-year term with the option of renewal. Amendments were also made so that a single judge could reject plainly inadmissible applications, while prior to this protocol only a three judge committee could make this final decision. In cases of doubt, the single judge refers the applications to the Committee of the Court.

A single judge may not examine applications against the state which nominated him. The three judge committee has jurisdiction to declare applications admissible and decide on the merits of the case if it was well founded and based on well established case law. Previously the three judge committee could only declare the case inadmissible, but could not decide on the merits of the case, which could only be done by a chambers of seven judges or the Grand Chamber.

Protocol 14 also provides that when a three judge committee decides on the merits of a case, the judge elected to represent that state is no longer a compulsory member of this committee. The judge can be invited by the committee, to replace one of its members, but only for specific reasons, such as when the application relates to the exhaustion of national legal remedies.

Protocol 14 empowered the court to declare applications inadmissible where the applicant has not suffered a significant disadvantage and which do not raise serious questions affecting the application or the interpretation of the convention, or important questions concerning national law. The European Commissioner for Human Rights is now allowed to intervene in cases as a third party, providing written comments and taking part in hearings. In order to reduce the workload of the court, Protocol 14 states that the court should encourage the parties to reach a settlement at an early stage of the proceedings, especially in repetitive cases.

The Committee of Ministers supervises the settlement's execution. Protocol 14 also allows the Committee of Ministers to ask the court to interpret a final judgment if there are difficulties in the execution of a final judgment. In order to prevent repetitive applications concerning structural problems in contracting states on which the court has previously made a final decision, the Committee of Ministers can in exceptional circumstances and with a two-thirds majority, initiate proceedings for non-compliance with a final decision in the Grand Chamber of the court.

Article 17 of protocol 14 allows the European Union to become party to the convention. In turn the Lisbon Treaty, which entered force in December 2009, provides that the European Union should accede and become a party to the convention. The Committee of Ministers is to evaluate in 2012 to 2015 the extent to which the implementation of Protocol 14 has improved the effectiveness of the court. The Committee of Ministers is to decide before 2019 whether more reforms of the court are necessary.
