= Azerbaijan–OSCE relations =

Relationship between Azerbaijan and OSCE

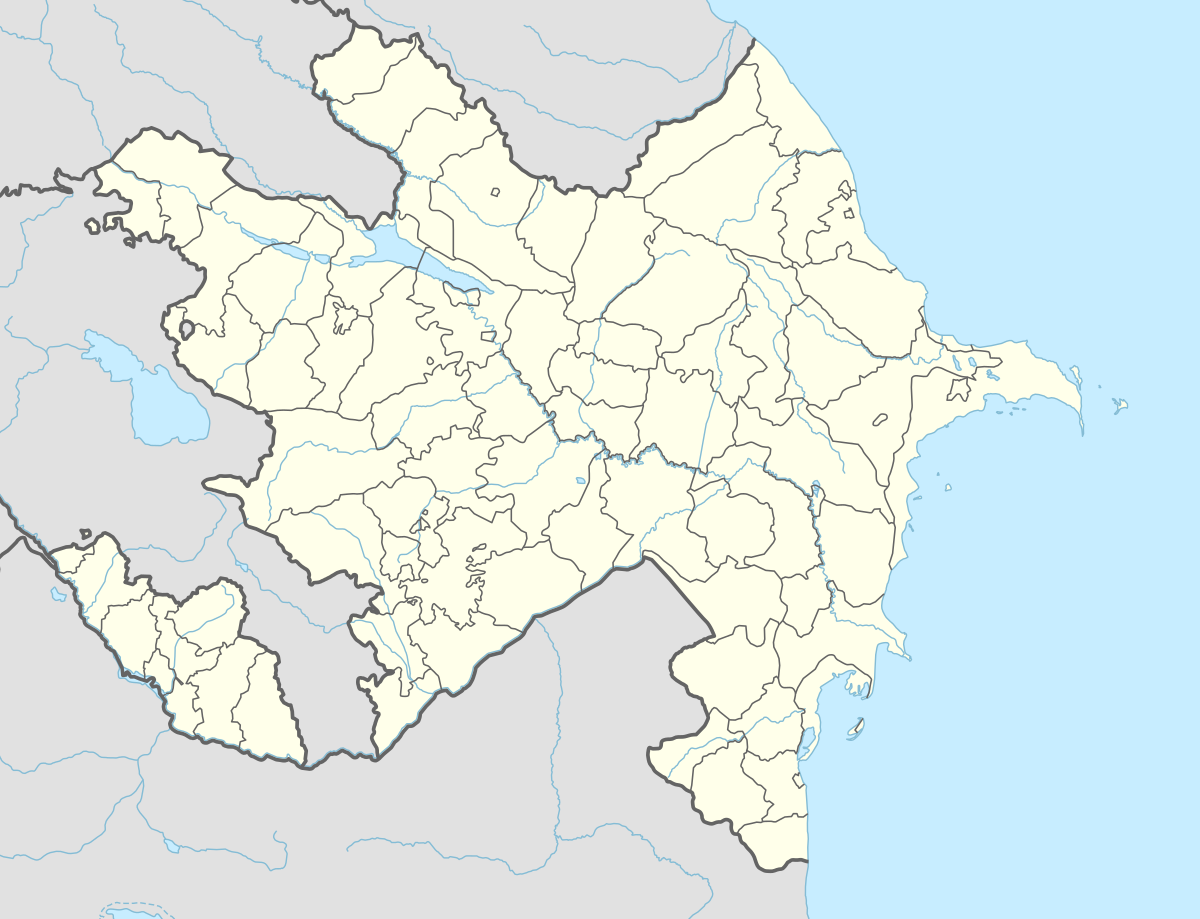
- Location of Azerbaijan

Relations between Azerbaijan and the Organization for Security and Cooperation in Europe (OSCE) began when Azerbaijan joined OSCE’s predecessor, the Conference on Security and Cooperation in Europe (CSCE), on January 30, 1992. This was the first European organization Azerbaijan joined. The CSCE transformed into the OSCE on 1 January 1995.

Since February 1992, the Armenian–Azerbaijani conflict has become the focus of OSCE in accordance with the principles of this organization. For this purpose, the first special mission of the OSCE was in Azerbaijan in mid-February.

The main task of this OSCE Minsk Group is to adjust the Armenian–Azerbaijani conflict and to prepare a relevant document for solving the Nagorno-Karabakh conflict in a peaceful manner, and to eliminate this conflict by calling a special Minsk Conference. The group includes 11 states – Germany, United States, France, Italy, Sweden, Czech Republic, Turkey, Belarus, Russia, Azerbaijan, and Armenia. Its co-chairing function was implemented by the representative of Russia and Finland from December 1994 until 1997, and since then by the representative of Russia, the United States and France.

== Early participation ==
For the first time, discussions related to Armenia-Azerbaijan conflict were held at the OSCE meeting for Senior Officials Committee on 27–28 February. The document confirming Nagorno-Karabakh's belonging to the Republic of Azerbaijan was reflected by a peaceful solution of the conflict provided that the borders were not changed.

Nagorno Karabakh conflict was discussed at the first additional assembly of the Council of Foreign Ministers of the OSCE on March 24, 1992.

The first participation of Azerbaijan in the OSCE Summit was in Helsinki on July 8–10, 1992.

Azerbaijan joined the OSCE Paris Charter, on December 20, 1993.

== Budapest Summit leading to Minsk Group ==
The CSCE Budapest Summit Meeting was held on 5–6 December 1994. According to the result of Budapest Summit, the CSCE has been transformed to OSCE that determinates civilian co-existence rules in the new Europe, provides protection of peace and democracy and human rights, carry out the security of member-countries and principles of mutually beneficial cooperation.

For the first time at the Budapest Summit, it was decided to create peacekeeping forces that could take part in the OSCE's security measures and direct them to the conflicting territories. The participating States have agreed to send the first peacekeeping multinational military unit under the leadership of the OSCE to the Nagorno-Karabakh region.

Based on the results of the Budapest Summit, the High Level Planning Group consisting of the military representatives appointed by membership states to the OSCE on the Armenian-Azerbaijani conflict was established on 20 December 1994 in Vienna.

The co-chairmanship institution of the Minsk process firstly was ruled by Finland and Russia then by Sweden and Russia during 1995–1997.

At the Lisbon Summit held on December 2–3, 1996, a Declaration of Common and Comprehensive Security Model was accepted by 54 participating states in Europe in the 21st Century. Notes were made on threats directed to the security of member states at the declaration and the importance of joint co-operation to eliminate these threats were emphasized.

At the Lisbon Summit, the OSCE participating States (excluding Armenia) agreed on the following principles in the solution of Armenian-Azerbaijani conflict:

- Territorial integrity of the Armenia and the Azerbaijan;
- To give the highest self-government status to Nagorno-Karabakh within Azerbaijan;
- To ensure the security of the entire population of Nagorno-Karabakh.

The United States of America, Russia and France are chairing the OSCE Minsk Group since January 1, 1997.

At present, Co-Chairs of the Minsk Group are:

- Bernard Fassier (France)
- Igor Popov (Russia)

At present, the content of the Minsk Group are consisting of: (according to information on the OSCE official website):

USA	The Kingdom of the Netherlands
Germany	Portugal
Azerbaijan	Russia
Belarus	Turkey
Armenia	Sweden
Italy	Finland
France	

The Minsk Group Co-chairs for the solution of the Armenian-Azerbaijani conflict made three proposals during 1997–1998. The first two proposals were rejected by Armenia and the last one was not accepted by Azerbaijan.

Participating in the next Summit of Heads of State and Government of the OSCE member states held in Istanbul on 18–19 November 1999, Azerbaijan joined the Istanbul Declaration and the European Security Charter.

The close cooperation was achieved between the OSCE Parliamentary Assembly (PA) consisting of over 300 deputy, and the National Assembly of Azerbaijan. The members of Parliamentary Assembly of OSCE representing Azerbaijan attend Parliamentary Assembly meetings each year.

Resolution #318 of the OSCE Permanent Council on the establishment of the OSCE Office in Baku was accepted on November 16, 1999.

After the Resolution #318 of the OSCE Permanent Council was accepted, Mutual Understanding Memorandum signed on November 25, 1999 was the beginning of cooperation between the OSCE and Azerbaijan.

The official opening of the OSCE Office in Baku took place on 18 July 2000.

== Minsk Group proposals ==
After the OSCE summit in Lisbon, the United States and France were appointed as co-chairs for the Minsk Group along with Russia. From the second half of 1997 to the present day, co-chairs of the Minsk Group made three proposals based on the principle of Lisbon summit about the return of seven districts located at out of Nagorno-Karabakh region to Azerbaijan and determination of the legal status of Mountainous Garabagh (Nagorno-Karabakh). The first two proposals were rejected by Armenia and the last one was not accepted by Azerbaijan:

=== Package ===
In this version, which was proposed in July 1997, envisaged simultaneous coordination of all issues including the determination of the status of Nagorno-Karabakh. However, Azerbaijan side rejected the proposal.

=== Stage ===
In this version proposed in September 1997, the way to resolve the conflict was in a staged manner. However, the Armenian side did not accept this proposal.

=== Common State solution ===
This proposal was based on the practice of the "Common State", which does not exist in the world practice. The idea of the "Common State" rejected by Azerbaijan was an indication of indifference to the documents adopted at the OSCE Budapest and Lisbon meetings. As a result, it was not possible to achieve positive results in the solution of the conflict.

== See also ==
- Foreign relations of Azerbaijan
