= Greece in the Council of Europe =

Greece was not one of the ten founding members of the Council of Europe, but it was the first state to join, doing so three months later, on 9 August 1949. In 1953, the Hellenic Parliament unanimously ratified the Council of Europe's human rights treaty, the European Convention on Human Rights, and its first protocol. Greece filed the first interstate case before the European Commission of Human Rights, Greece v. United Kingdom, in 1956, alleging human rights violations in British Cyprus.

In 1967, following a military coup, the Greek junta abolished democracy, bringing itself into conflict with the Council of Europe. In September 1967, Denmark, Norway, Sweden, and the Netherlands filed an interstate application with the Commission regarding human rights abuses in Greece. The Parliamentary Assembly of the Council of Europe also appointed a rapporteur, Max van der Stoel, to investigate the situation in Greece. On 12 December 1969, following the leaking of the Greek case report of the commission, Greece left the Council of Europe before the matter could be brought to a vote. After the fall of the junta, Greece rejoined the Council of Europe on 28 November 1974. Greece was the first state to have left the Council of Europe.

The Constitution of Greece forbids proselytism, a blanket ban which European Court of Human Rights has ruled to be incompatible with Article 9 in multiple influential cases, including Larissis and others v. Greece and Kokkinakis v. Greece. In both cases, the Court found that, while banning proselytism may be justified under certain circumstances, a blanket ban violates freedom of religion.

Greece also participates in the Council of Europe bodies European Commission against Racism and Intolerance (ECRI), the European Committee for the Prevention of Torture (CPT), and the Group of States against Corruption (GRECO).

In 2020, Greece assumed the presidency of the Council of Europe from May to November. That year, the Greek government nominated the European Court of Human Rights for the Nobel Peace Prize.

== See also ==
- Human rights in Greece
