= European Court of Human Rights =

Supranational court of the Council of Europe

- Interactive map of European Court of Human Rights
- 48°35′48″N 07°46′27″E
- Established: 1959 (initially); 1998 (permanent)
- Jurisdiction: 46 member states of the Council of Europe
- Location: Strasbourg, France
- Coordinates: 48°35′48″N 07°46′27″E
- Composition method: Appointed by member states and elected by the Parliamentary Assembly of the Council of Europe
- Authorised by: European Convention on Human Rights
- Appeals to: Grand Chamber of the European Court of Human Rights
- Number of positions: 46 judges, one from each of the 46 member states
- Website: Official website

President
- Currently: Mattias Guyomar
- Since: 2025

European Court of Human Rights building

The European Court of Human Rights (ECtHR), also known as the Strasbourg Court, is an international court of the Council of Europe which interprets the European Convention on Human Rights (ECHR). The court hears applications alleging that a contracting state has breached one or more of the human rights enumerated in the convention or its optional protocols to which a member state is a party. The court is based in Strasbourg, France.

The court was established in 1959 and decided its first case in 1960 in Lawless v. Ireland. An application can be lodged by an individual, a group of individuals, or one or more of the other contracting states. Aside from judgments, the court can also issue advisory opinions. The convention was adopted within the context of the Council of Europe, and all of its 46 member states are contracting parties to the convention. The court's primary means of judicial interpretation is the living instrument doctrine, meaning that the Convention is interpreted in light of present-day conditions.

International law scholars consider the ECtHR to be the most effective international human rights court in the world. Nevertheless, the court has faced challenges with verdicts not implemented by the contracting parties.

== History and structure ==
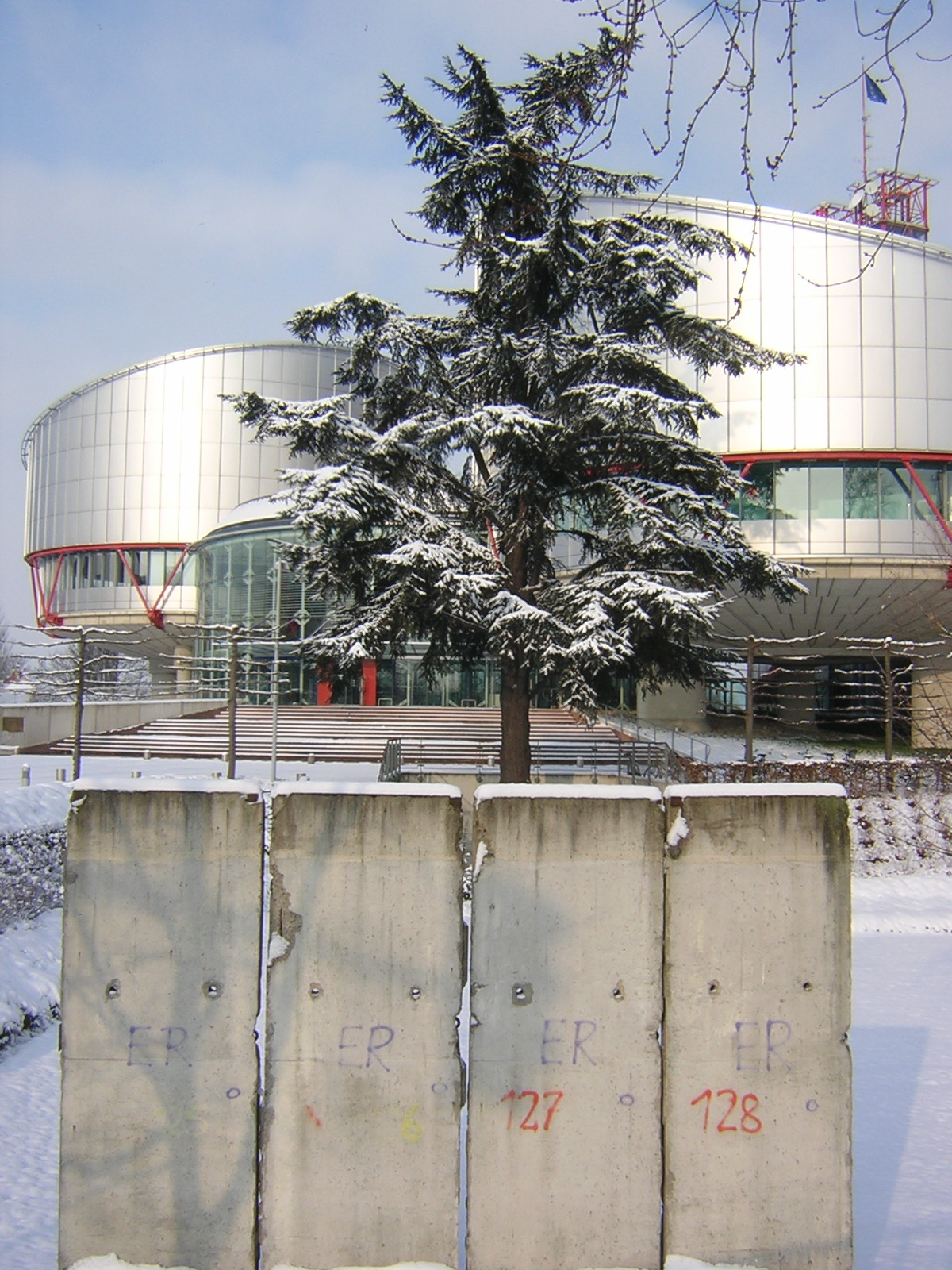
A segment of the Berlin Wall in front of the European Court of Human Rights

On 10 December 1948, the United Nations adopted the Universal Declaration of Human Rights, which aims to promote the universal recognition of rights set out therein, in order to strengthen the protection of human rights at the international level. While hugely important in setting a global standard for the first time, the declaration was essentially aspirational, and had no judicial enforcement mechanism. In 1949, the twelve member states of the newly created Council of Europe began work on the European Convention on Human Rights, drawing inspiration from the rights already set out in the Declaration, but with the crucial difference that—for the European countries which chose to sign up to it—there would be a judicial mechanism to ensure that they respected the basic rights of their citizens.

The court was established on 21 January 1959 on the basis of Article 19 of the European Convention on Human Rights when its first members were elected by the Parliamentary Assembly of the Council of Europe. Initially, access to the court was restricted by the European Commission of Human Rights, abolished in 1998. The court kept a low profile during its first years and did not accumulate much case law, first finding a violation in Neumeister v Austria (1968). The convention charges the court with ensuring the observance of the engagement undertaken by the contracting states in relation to the convention and its protocols, that is ensuring the enforcement and implementation of the European Convention in the member states of the Council of Europe.

== As a court of the Council of Europe ==
The European Court of Human Rights, which enforces the European Convention on Human Rights, is the best known body of the Council of Europe. The Council of Europe (CoE) (French: Conseil de l'Europe, CdE) is an international organisation founded in the wake of World War II to uphold human rights, democracy and the rule of law in Europe. Founded in 1949, it now has 46 member states, covering a population of approximately 700 million, and operates with an annual budget of approximately 500 million euros.

The organisation is distinct from the 27-nation European Union (EU), although it is sometimes confused with it, partly because the EU has adopted the original flag of Europe created by the Council of Europe in 1955, as well as the anthem of Europe. No country has ever joined the EU without first belonging to the Council of Europe. The Council of Europe is an official United Nations observer.

== Member states ==
Member states of the Council of Europe. In addition, the European Convention on Human Rights (ECHR) applies in Kosovo as a result of domestic incorporation of the ECHR.

The jurisdiction of the court has been recognised to date by all 46 member states of the Council of Europe. On 1 November 1998, the court became a full-time institution and the European Commission of Human Rights, which used to decide on admissibility of applications, was abolished by Protocol 11.

The accession of new states to the European Convention on Human Rights following the fall of the Berlin Wall in 1989 led to a sharp increase in applications filed in the court. The efficiency of the court was threatened seriously by the large accumulation of pending applications.

In 1999, 8,400 applications were allocated to be heard. In 2003, 27,200 cases were filed and the number pending rose to approximately 65,000. In 2005, the court opened 45,500 case files. In 2009, 57,200 applications were allocated, with 119,300 pending. At the time, more than 90 per cent of applications were declared to be inadmissible, and the majority of cases decided—around 60 per cent of the decisions by the court—related to what is termed repetitive cases: where the court has already delivered judgment finding a violation of the European Convention on Human Rights or where well established case law exists on a similar case.

Protocol 11 was designed to deal with the backlog of pending cases by establishing the court and its judges as a full-time institution, by simplifying the procedure and reducing the length of proceedings. However, as the workload of the court continued to increase, the contracting states agreed that further reforms were necessary and in May 2004, the Council of Europe Committee of Ministers adopted Protocol 14 to the European Convention on Human Rights. Protocol 14 was drafted with the aim of reducing the workload of the court and that of the Committee of Ministers of the Council of Europe, which supervises the execution of judgments, so that the court could focus on cases that raise important human rights issues.

== Judges ==
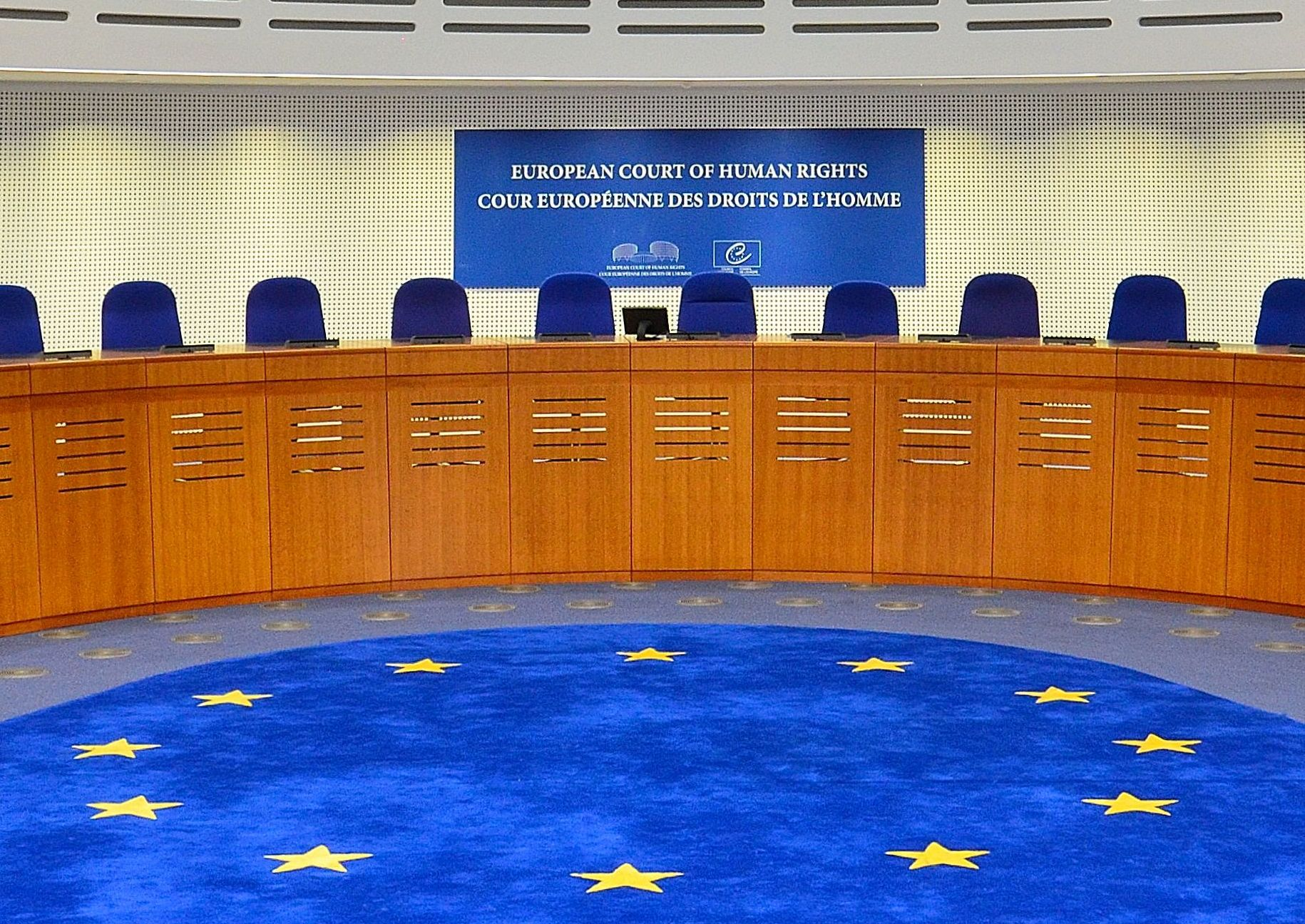
Courtroom of the European Court of Human Rights

Judges are elected for a non-renewable nine-year term. The number of full-time judges sitting in the court is equal to the number of contracting states to the European Convention on Human Rights, currently 46. The convention requires that judges be of "high moral character" and have qualifications suitable for high judicial office, or be jurists of recognised competence.

Each judge is elected by majority vote in the Parliamentary Assembly of the Council of Europe from among three candidates nominated by each contracting state. Judges are elected whenever a sitting judge's term has expired or when a new state accedes to the convention. The retiring age of judges is 70, but they may continue to serve as judges until a new judge is elected or until the cases in which they sit have come to an end.

Judges perform their duties in an individual capacity and are prohibited from having any institutional or similar ties with the state in respect of which they were elected. To ensure the independence of the court, judges are not allowed to participate in activity that may compromise the court's independence. Judges cannot hear or decide a case if they have a familial or professional relationship with a party. A judge can be dismissed from office only if the other judges decide, by a two-thirds majority, that the judge has ceased to fulfil the required conditions. Judges enjoy, during their term as judges, the privileges and immunities provided for in Article 40 of the Statute of the Council of Europe.

The European Court of Human Rights is assisted by a registry made up of around 640 agents, of which a little less than half of lawyers divided into 31 sections. The registry carries out preparatory work for the judges, and performs the communication activities of the court, with the applicants, the public and the press. The registrar and the deputy registrar are elected by the Plenary Court.

== Plenary court and administration ==
The plenary court is an assembly of all of the court's judges. It has no judicial functions. It elects the court's president, vice-president, registrar and deputy registrar. It also deals with administrative matters, discipline, working methods, reforms, the establishment of Chambers and the adoption of the Rules of Court.

The president of the court, the two vice-presidents (also section presidents) and the three other section presidents are elected by the Plenary Court, Section presidents are elected by the Plenary Court, a formation made up of the 46 elected judges of the court. The mandate of the holders is for a renewable period of three years. They are renowned for their morality and competence. They must be independent and there is incompatibility with other functions. They cannot be revoked by their state of origin, but only by decision of their peers, taken by a two-thirds majority and for serious reasons.

== Jurisdiction ==
The court has jurisdiction amongst the member states of the Council of Europe which includes almost every country in Europe except for Belarus, Kazakhstan, Kosovo, Russia and Vatican City. The jurisdiction of the court is generally divided into inter-state cases, applications by individuals against contracting states, and advisory opinions in accordance with Protocol No.2. Applications by individuals constitute the majority of cases heard by the court. A committee is constituted by three judges, chambers by seven judges, and a Grand Chamber by 17 judges.

=== Applications by individuals ===
Applications by individuals against contracting states, alleging that the state violated their rights under the European Convention on Human Rights, can be made by any person, non-governmental organisation, or group of individuals. Although the official languages of the court are English and French, applications may be submitted in any one of the official languages of the contracting states. An application has to be made in writing and signed by the applicant or by the applicant's representative.

Once registered with the court, the case is assigned to a Judge Rapporteur, who can make a final decision on whether the case is inadmissible. A case may be inadmissible when it is incompatible with the requirements of ratione materiae, ratione temporis or ratione personae, or if the case cannot be proceeded with on formal grounds, such as non-exhaustion of domestic remedies, lapse of the four months from the last internal decision complained of, anonymity, substantial identity with a matter already submitted to the court, or with another procedure of international investigation.

If the Judge Rapporteur decides that the case can proceed, the case is then referred to a chamber of the court which, unless it decides that the application is inadmissible, communicates the case to the government of the state against which the application is made, asking the government to present its observations on the case.

The chamber of the court then deliberates and judges the case on its admissibility and its merits. Cases that raise serious questions of interpretation and application of the European Convention on Human Rights, a serious issue of general importance, or which may depart from previous case law can be heard in the Grand Chamber if all parties to the case agree to the chamber of the court relinquishing jurisdiction to the Grand Chamber. A panel of five judges decides whether the Grand Chamber accepts the referral.

=== Interstate cases ===
Any contracting state to the European Convention on Human Rights can sue another contracting state in the court for alleged breaches of the convention, although in practice this is very rare. As of 2021, five interstate cases have been decided by the court:

- Ireland v. United Kingdom (no. 5310/71), judgement of 18 January 1978 on inhuman and degrading treatment in Northern Ireland (art. 3)
- Denmark v. Turkey (no. 34382/97), judgement of 5 April 2000 ratifying a friendly settlement of 450,000 DKK regarding a Danish national detained in Turkey (art. 3)
- Cyprus v. Turkey (IV) (no. 25781/94), judgements of 10 May 2001 on the treatment of missing persons (art. 2, 3 and 5), the right of return of Greeks who have fled to the south (art. 8, 13 and P1-1), the rights of Greeks still living in the north (art. 3, 8, 9, 10, 13, P1-1, P1-2) and trial by military courts (art. 6). A subsequent judgement of 12 May 2014 awarded €90 million in 'just satisfaction' (art. 41)
- Georgia v. Russian Federation (I) (no. 13255/07), judgement of 3 July 2014 on the collective expulsion of Georgians from Russia (art. 3, 5, 13, 38, P4-4) and Russia not cooperating with the court (art. 38)
- Georgia v. Russian Federation (II) (no. 38263/08), judgement of 21 January 2021

=== Advisory opinion ===
The Committee of Ministers may, by majority vote, ask the court to deliver an advisory opinion on the interpretation of the European Convention on Human Rights, unless the matter relates to the content and scope of fundamental rights which the court has already considered. Since 2018, member states can similarly request advisory opinions on questions of principle concerning the interpretation or application of the Convention, on the basis of Protocol No. 16. This mechanism aims to foster dialogue between national courts and the ECtHR, thereby preempting Convention violations and minimizing the latter's caseload. Unlike preliminary references under EU law, advisory opinions may only be solicited by the "highest courts and tribunals" of a member state. Although Article 5 of Protocol No. 16 states that "Advisory opinions shall not be binding", they nonetheless enter the ECtHR's case law and may be enforced through later individual complaints if contravened.

=== Erga omnes effects ===
ECtHR rulings have erga omnes effects (that is, they are potentially binding on all member states), because the court "determines issues on public-policy grounds in the common interest, thereby extending human rights jurisprudence throughout the community of European Convention States", although erga omnes effect "is not regarded by all States Parties as a legal requirement".

== Procedure and decisions ==
A chart showing how cases progress through the European Court of Human Rights

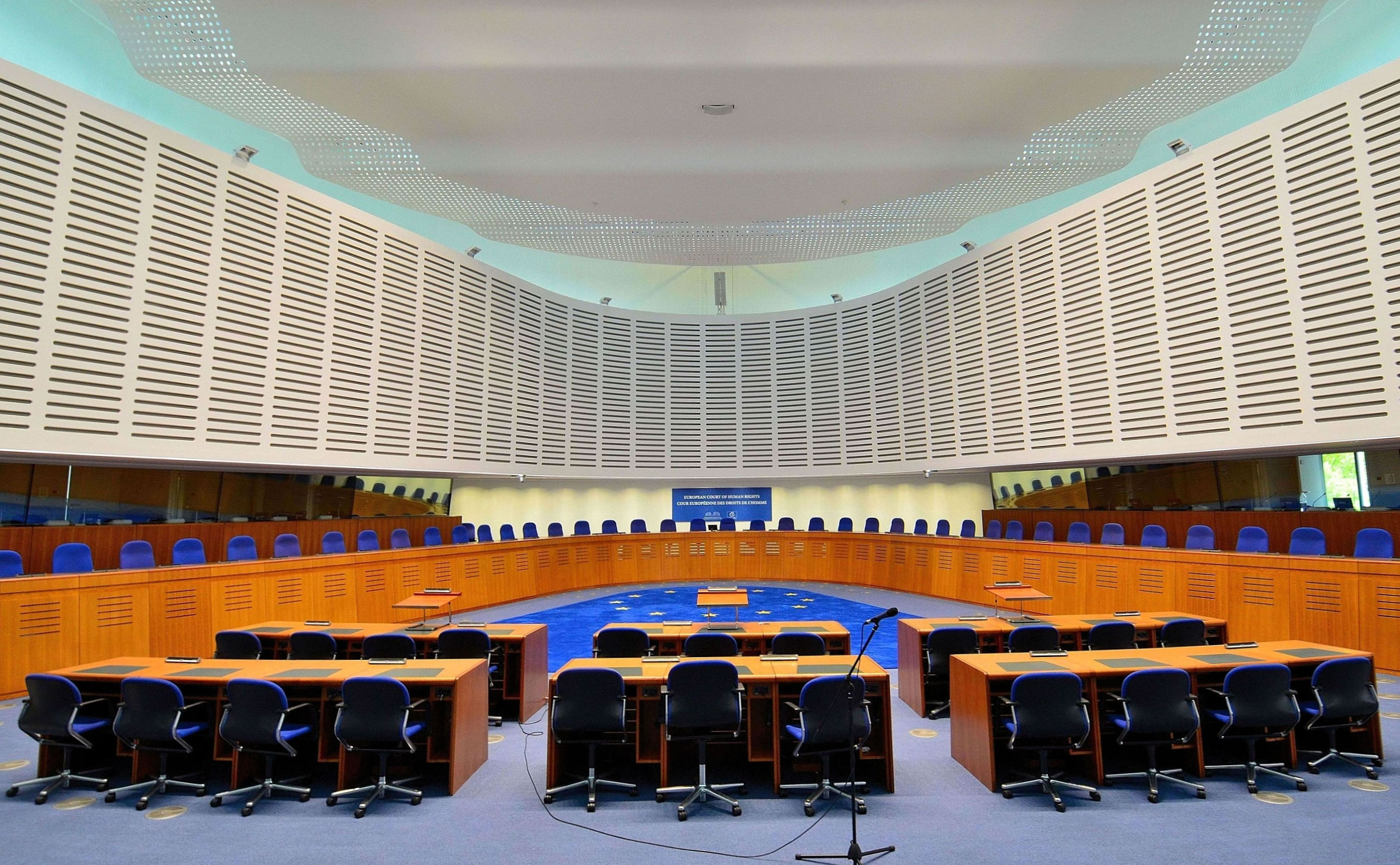
The Grand Chamber of the European Court of Human Rights

After the preliminary finding of admissibility the court examines the case by hearing representations from both parties. The court may undertake any investigation it deems necessary on the facts or issues raised in the application and contracting states are required to provide the court with all necessary assistance for this purpose.

The European Convention on Human Rights requires all hearings to be in public, unless there are exceptional circumstances justifying the holding of a private hearing. In practice the majority of cases are heard in private following written pleadings. In confidential proceedings the court may assist both parties in securing a settlement, in which case the court monitors the compliance of the agreement with the convention. However, in many cases, a hearing is not held.

The judgment of the Grand Chamber is final. Judgments by the chamber of the court become final three months after they are issued, unless a reference to the Grand Chamber for review or appeal has been made. If the panel of the Grand Chamber rejects the request for referral, the judgment of the chamber of the court becomes final. The Grand Chamber is made up of 17 judges: the court's president and vice-presidents, the section presidents and the national judge, together with other judges selected by drawing of lots. Grand Chambers include a public hearing, which is transmitted as a webcast on the ECHR site. After the public hearing, the judges deliberate.

The court's chamber decides both issues regarding admissibility and merits of the case. Generally, if any claim is found admissible, its merits are dealt with in the same judgment. In final judgments the court makes a declaration that a contracting state has (or has not) violated the convention in respect of each admissible claim, and in case of violation may order the contracting state to pay material and/or moral damages and the legal expenses incurred in domestic courts and the court in bringing the case.

The court's judgments are public and must contain reasons justifying the decision. Article 46 of the convention provides that contracting states undertake to abide by the court's final decision. On the other hand, advisory opinions are, by definition, non-binding. The court has to date decided consistently that under the convention it has no jurisdiction to annul domestic laws or administrative practices which violate the convention.

The Committee of Ministers of the Council of Europe is charged with supervising the execution of the court's judgments. The Committee of Ministers oversees the contracting states' changes to their national law in order that it is compatible with the convention, or individual measures taken by the contracting state to redress violations. Judgments by the court are binding on the respondent states concerned and states usually comply with the Court's judgments.

Chambers decide cases by a majority. Any judge who has heard the case can attach to the judgment a separate opinion. This opinion can concur or dissent with the decision of the court. In case of a tie in voting, the president has the casting vote.

=== Exhaustion of domestic remedies ===
Article 35 of the European Convention on Human Rights establishes as a precondition on referral to the European Court of Human Rights, the exhaustion of domestic remedies. This condition is the consequence of the subsidiary jurisdiction of the supranational court, which monitors the application of the convention and seeks to eradicate human rights violations. The applicant must establish the inability of the national courts to remedy the breaches, by exercising the appropriate effective and adequate remedies, and in substance alleging a violation of the Convention.

=== Interim measures ===
Rule 39 of the Rules of the Court permits the ECtHR to "indicate to the parties any interim measure which they consider should be adopted in the interests of the parties or of the proper conduct of the proceedings." Interim measures are binding and afford litigants temporary protections on an expedited basis, although the ECtHR has chosen to only impose them in cases concerning imminent danger to life and limb. Such measures are often deployed to prevent extradition or expulsion to countries with inadequate human rights guarantees, whereas requests to prevent potentially damaging publications or property seizures seldom elicit similar responses.

== Just satisfaction ==
The court may award pecuniary or non-pecuniary damages, called "just satisfaction". The awards are typically small in comparison to verdicts by national courts and rarely exceed £1,000 plus legal costs. Non-pecuniary damages are more closely correlated to what the state can afford to pay than the specific harm suffered by the complainant. In some cases, repeated patterns of human rights violations lead to higher awards in an effort to punish the responsible state, but paradoxically in other cases they lead to lower awards, or the cases being struck entirely.

== Judicial interpretation ==
The court's primary method of judicial interpretation is the living instrument doctrine, meaning that the text of the Convention "must be interpreted in the light of present-day conditions" rather than the intent of its framers. In Mamatkulov and Askarov v. Turkey (2008), the court emphasised that it "upholds individual rights as practical and effective, rather than theoretical and illusory protections". Another key part of the Court's interpretation is the 1969 Vienna Convention on the Law of Treaties.

One area that the living instrument doctrine has changed ECtHR jurisprudence over time is with regard to differential treatment exclusively based on ethnicity, gender, religion, or sexual orientation, which it is increasingly likely to label unjustified discrimination. In addition, with the proliferation of alternative family arrangements, the court has expanded its definition of family under Article 8, for example to same-sex couples, as in Oliari and Others v Italy (2015). Although defenders argue that living instrument doctrine is necessary for the court to stay relevant and its rulings to adapt to the actual conditions, such interpretations are labeled overreach or judicial activism by critics. At the same time, in academia it is considered that the ECtHR is one of the most pragmatic courts and is in fact not nearly as progressive as other regional human rights courts, such as the Inter-American Court of Human Rights.

=== Margin of appreciation ===
The Court uses the doctrine of margin of appreciation, referring to the member states' rights to set moral standards within reason. Over time, the court has narrowed the margin of appreciation (to the point, according to some commentators, of a "demise" of margin of appreciation). Narrowing margin of appreciation is a target of criticism for those who believe that the ECtHR should minimise its role, especially from the United Kingdom.

Proponents of a stronger recognition of margin of appreciation cite local conceptions of human rights, specific to the context of each country and its culture, and the risk of handing down judgements that lack local cultural and grassroots legitimacy. Critics argue that the principle of "emerging consensus" of the member states on which the ECtHR operates is fundamentally flawed, because such a consensus often relies on trends, and historically in many instances social and political consensus was retrospectively acknowledged to have been wrong.

Such an approach is accused of risking stigmatisation and coercion of the few dissenting countries, encouraging a pack mentality. Furthermore, critics argue that the EHtCR has claimed that such consensus exists even when objectively it did not, due to the judicial activism of its judges. It has been said that in failing to distinctly define how a consensus is reached reduces its legitimacy. Furthermore, as the ECtHR grows, the consensus between the members diminishes.

However, the margin of appreciation doctrine has also come under sharp criticism from jurists and academics who say that it undermines the universal nature of human rights.

=== Proportionality analysis ===
Proportionality analysis governs much of the Court's jurisprudence. The guarantees of ECHR Articles 8, 9, 10, and 11 are subject to whatever limitations may be "necessary in a democratic society", citing factors including national security, public safety, health and morals, and the rights and freedoms of others. Such conditions require the balancing of individual rights and community interests, as first articulated in the Belgian Linguistic Case (No. 2). Critics maintain that proportionality engenders largely subjective rulings: a judge's personal preferences and beliefs may colour their perceptions of rights' relative importance. The Court has established certain formulas to ensure consistency across such decisions, but these guidelines cover only a small fraction of its case law.

== Relationship with other courts ==
=== European Court of Justice ===
The Court of Justice of the European Union (CJEU) is not institutionally related to the European Court of Human Rights: the two courts are related to distinct organisations. However, since all EU states are members of the Council of Europe and so are parties of the Convention on Human Rights, there are concerns about consistency in case law between the two courts. The CJEU refers to the case law of the European Court of Human Rights and treats the Convention on Human Rights as if it were part of the EU's legal system since it forms part of the legal principles of the EU member states.

Even though its member states are party to the convention, the European Union itself is not a party, as it did not have competence to become one under previous treaties. However, EU institutions are bound under Article 6 of the EU Treaty of Nice to respect human rights under the convention. Furthermore, since the Treaty of Lisbon took effect on 1 December 2009, the EU is expected to sign the convention. That would mean that the Court of Justice is bound by the judicial precedents of the Court of Human Rights' case law and so is subject to its human rights law, which would avoid issues of conflicting case law between these two courts. In December 2014, the CJEU released Opinion 2/13 rejecting accession to the Convention.

Despite the European Union's failure to accede to the Convention, the ECtHR has consistently held that member states are bound by ECHR guarantees even when executing and implementing EU law. Nevertheless, the Court has simultaneously sought to promote international cooperation and avoid interfering in internal Union affairs. It has balanced the conflicting aims of fostering European harmony and avoiding ECHR circumvention via the "Bosphorus Presumption", a policy of conditional deference articulated in Bosphorus Hava Yollari Turizm ve Ticaret Anonim Sirketi v Ireland. Because the CJEU represents a "comparable" human rights enforcement mechanism, the ECtHR may presume "that a State has not departed from the requirements of the Convention when it does no more than implement legal obligations flowing from its [EU] membership". This presumption may be refuted in any particular instances where protections of Convention rights are "manifestly deficient".

=== National courts ===
Most of the contracting parties to the European Convention on Human Rights have incorporated the convention into their own national legal systems, either through constitutional provision, statute or judicial decision. The ECtHR increasingly considers judicial dialogue with national courts to be a "high priority", especially when it comes to implementation of judgements. According to a 2012 study, the ECtHR tends to justify its decisions with citations to its own case law in order to convince national courts to accept its rulings.

In 2015, Russia adopted a law declaring it legal to overrule judgements from the ECtHR, codifying an earlier Russian Constitutional Court decision which ruled that Russia could refuse to recognise an ECtHR decision if it conflicted with the Constitution of Russia, and in 2020 Russia made constitutional amendments stipulating that the Russian Constitution supersedes international law. (In March 2022, due to the Russian invasion of Ukraine and a history of disregard for the principles of the Convention, Russia was expelled from the Council of Europe.) Other countries have also moved to restrict the binding nature of the ECtHR judgments, subject to the countries' own constitutional principles. In 2004, the Federal Constitutional Court of Germany ruled that judgements handed down by the ECtHR are not always binding on German courts. The Italian Constitutional Court also restricts the applicability of ECtHR decisions.

A 2016 book characterises Austria, Belgium, the Czech Republic, Germany, Italy, Poland, and Sweden to be mostly friendly to ECtHR judgements; France, Hungary, the Netherlands, Norway, Switzerland, and Turkey to be moderately critical; the United Kingdom to be strongly critical; and Russia to be openly hostile. In 2019, south Caucasus states were judged partially compliant in a law review article.

== Effectiveness ==
International law scholars consider the ECtHR to be the most effective international human rights court in the world. According to Michael Goldhaber in A People's History of the European Court of Human Rights, "Scholars invariably describe it with superlatives".

=== Implementation ===
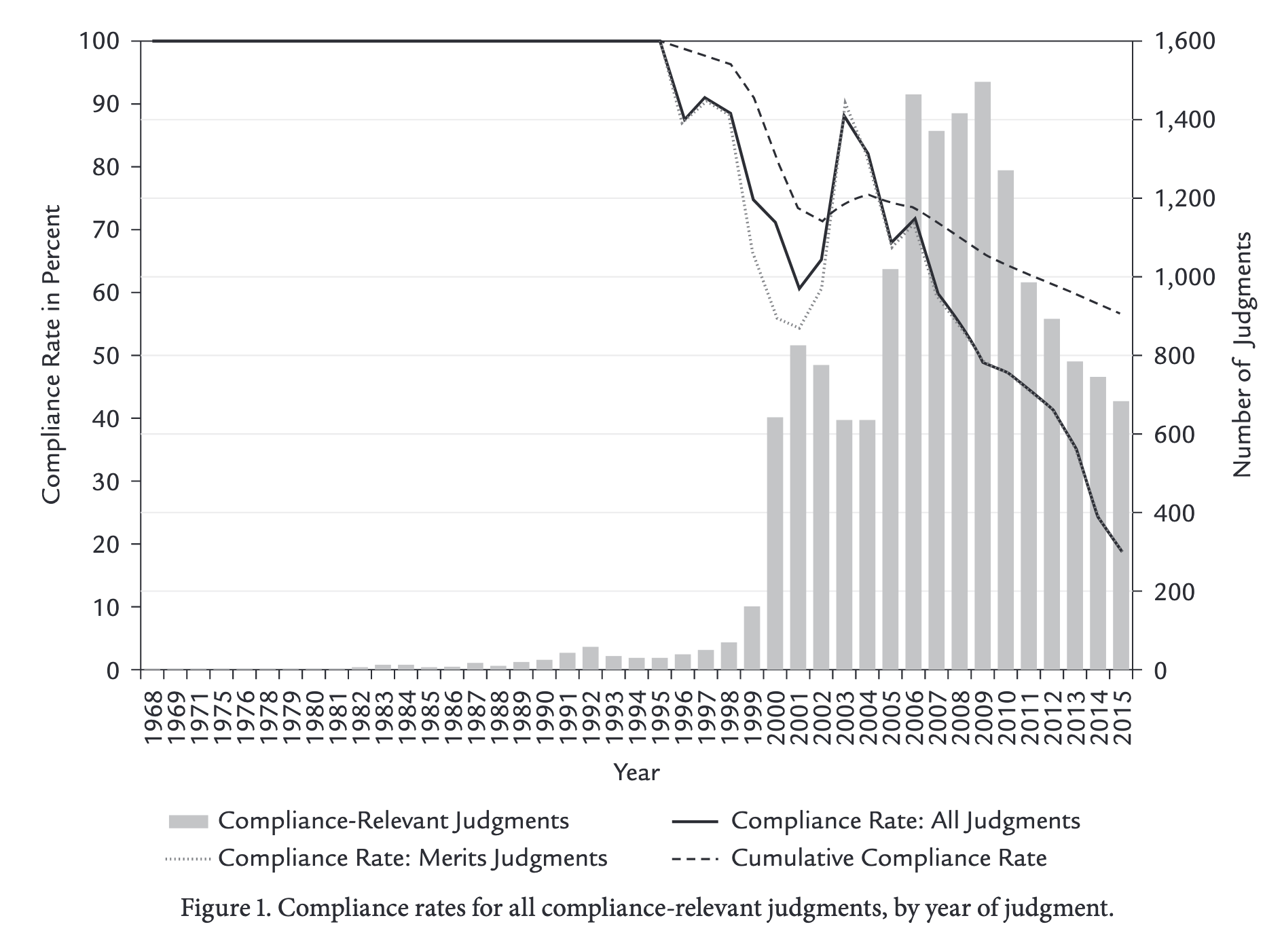
Compliance with all compliance-relevant judgments of the European Court of Human Rights as of 10 March 2017. At that date, the oldest non-complied judgement was from 1996.

Implementation of leading cases from the last 10 years as of August 2021. No implementation is coloured black while 100% implementation is white. Average implementation is 53%, with the lowest being Azerbaijan (4%) and Russia (10%) and the highest Luxembourg, Monaco, and Estonia (100%) and Czechia (96%). (Belarus appears white here because it is excluded from the map: it is not a member state and does not implement rulings.)

The court lacks enforcement powers. Some states have ignored ECtHR verdicts and continued practices judged to be human rights violations. Although all damages must be paid to the applicant within the time frame specified by the court (usually three months) or else will accumulate interest, there is no formal deadline for any more complex compliance required by the judgement. However, by leaving a judgement unimplemented for a long period of time, brings into question the state's commitment to addressing human rights violations in a timely fashion.

The number of non-implemented judgements rose from 2,624 in 2001 to 9,944 at the end of 2016, 48% of which had gone without implementation five years or more. In 2016, all but one of the 47 member countries of the Council of Europe had not implemented at least one ECtHR verdict in a timely fashion, although most non-implemented verdicts concern a few countries: Italy (2,219), Russia (1,540), Turkey (1,342), and Ukraine (1,172). More than 3,200 non-implemented judgements "concerned violations by security forces and poor detention conditions".

Council of Europe Commissioner for Human Rights, Nils Muižnieks, stated: "Our work is based on cooperation and good faith. When you don't have that, it's very difficult to have an impact. We kind of lack the tools to help countries that don't want to be helped." Before its ejection Russia systematically ignored ECtHR verdicts, paying compensation in most cases but refusing to fix the problem, leading to a high number of repeat cases. Russian legislation set up a specific fund for paying the claimants in successful ECtHR verdicts.

Notable non-implemented judgements include:

- In Hirst v. United Kingdom (2005), and several subsequent cases, the court found that a blanket deprivation of suffrage to British prisoners violated Article 3 of Protocol 1, which guarantees the right to vote. A minimal compromise was implemented in 2017.
- The Constitution of Bosnia and Herzegovina was first ruled to be discriminatory in 2009 (Sejdić and Finci v. Bosnia and Herzegovina), for preventing Bosnian citizens who were not of Bosniak, Croat, or Serb ethnicity from being elected to certain state offices. As of December 2019, the discriminatory provisions have yet to be repealed or amended, despite three subsequent cases confirming their incompatibility with the Convention.
- In Alekseyev v. Russia (2010), the ban on Moscow Pride was judged to violate freedom of assembly. In 2012, Russian courts banned the event for the next 100 years. The ECtHR confirmed its ruling that bans on pride parades violate freedom of assembly rights in Alekseyev and Others v. Russia (2018).
- Bayev and Others v. Russia (2017), relating to the Russian gay propaganda law and related laws, which the court judged to abridge freedom of speech.
- Azerbaijani opposition politician Ilgar Mammadov, whose imprisonment the ECtHR ruled illegal in 2014; he was not released until 2018. He was subsequently acquitted and paid compensation.
- Following Burmych and Others v. Ukraine (2017), the ECtHR dismissed all 12,143 cases following the pattern of Ivanov v. Ukraine (2009) as well as any future cases following that pattern, handing them to the Department of Execution at the Council of Europe for enforcement. These cases all involved complainants not being paid money they were due under Ukrainian law. In the eight years between Ivanov and Burmych, Ukraine made no effort to resolve these cases, leading the ECtHR to "effectively [give] up on trying to incentivise Ukraine to comply with its judgments". As of 2020, the money owed to the complainants in these cases remains unpaid.

Another issue is delayed implementation of judgements.

=== Caseload ===
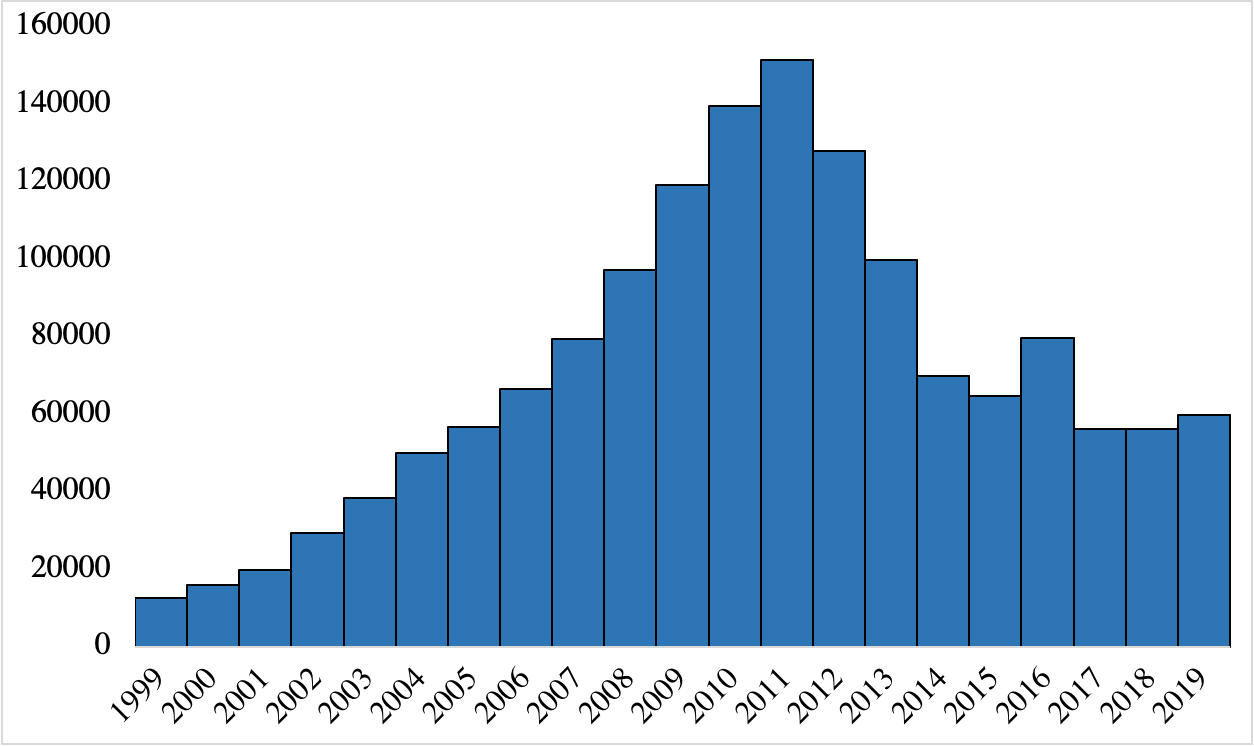
The backlog of pending cases has gone down from a peak of 151,600 in 2011, in part due to streamlined rejection of applications at the admissibility stage.

The caseload of the court expanded rapidly after the fall of the Soviet Union, growing from fewer than 8,400 cases filed in 1999 to 57,000 in 2009. Most of these cases concern nationals of the former Eastern Bloc where there is less trust in the court system. In 2009, the court had a backlog of 120,000 cases which would have required 46 years to process at the previous rate, leading to reforms. According to the BBC, the court began "to be seen as a victim of its own success".

Between 2007 and 2017, the number of cases dealt with each year was relatively constant (between 1,280 and 1,550); two-thirds of cases were repetitive and most concerned a few countries: Turkey (2,401), Russia (2,110), Romania (1,341), and Poland (1,272). Repetitive cases indicate a pattern of human rights violations in a given country. The 2010 Interlaken Declaration stated that the court would reduce its caseload by cutting back on the number of repetitive cases it dealt with.

As a result of Protocol 14 reforms to reduce caseload, single judges were empowered to reject applications as inadmissible and a system of "pilot judgements" was created to handle repetitive cases without a formal finding for each one. Pending applications peaked at 151,600 in 2011 and were reduced to 59,800 by 2019.

These reforms led to an increasing number of applications being declared inadmissible or bypassed a ruling under the new pilot procedure. According to Steven Greer, "large numbers of applications will not, in practice, be examined", and this situation is qualified as a "structural denial of justice for certain categories of meritorious applicants whose cases cannot be handled". Access to justice may also be de facto impeded by the lack of legal aid and other factors.

=== Impact ===
ECtHR rulings have expanded the protection of human rights in every signatory country. Notable rights secured include:

- Article 2: right to life including the abolition of capital punishment, and effective investigation of deaths in custody and due to domestic violence
- Article 3: freedom from torture and ill-treatment, ending police brutality and excessively poor conditions in prisons, banning forced sterilisation
- Article 4: Article 4 cases have resulted in the criminalisation of forced labour and human trafficking in several countries
- Article 5: liberty and security, such as ending excessive pretrial detention that resulted in innocent people jailed for years
- Article 6: right to a fair trial, including quashing wrongful convictions, limiting the length of judicial proceedings to avoid unfair delays, and securing judicial impartiality
- Article 8:
  - Right to privacy, which has included limits on wiretapping and decriminalisation of homosexuality
  - Right to family life, including ending child custody regimes which discriminated against men, LGBT people, and religious minorities
- Article 9: freedom of conscience and religion including conscientious objection, right to proselytise, undue burdens on exercise of religion, state interference in religious organisations
- Article 10: freedom of expression protections, including quashing of defamation laws that prohibited expressing unflattering opinions or imposed excessive penalties, protection for whistleblowers and journalists who exposed political corruption or criticised the government
- Article 11: freedom of association and peaceful assembly, such as the right to organise pride parades and political demonstrations
- Article 14 and Protocol 12: right to equal treatment, such as ruling against forms of institutional racism against Romani people
- Protocol 1, Article 1: property rights, including restoration of property illegally confiscated by the state and fair compensation for expropriation

== Honours and awards ==
In 2010, the court received the Freedom Medal from the Roosevelt Institute in New York. In 2020, the Greek government nominated the court for the Nobel Peace Prize.

== See also ==
- Strasbourg Observers
- Strasbourg Justice Meetings
- European Convention on Human Rights
- African Court on Human and Peoples' Rights – regional court established in 2006
- Human rights in Europe
- Inter-American Court of Human Rights – regional court established in 1979
- List of LGBT-related cases before international courts and quasi-judicial bodies
