= Azerbaijan and GUAM relations =

GUAM was created to help participants use mutual cooperation to become closer to European Union and NATO. GUAM countries were bound by a desire to prevent Russian expansionism in the region. Azerbaijan has a strategic role in the Organization for Democracy and Economic Development. Expanding the links with international organizations and individual countries is in the interest of Azerbaijan.

== History ==
First, cooperation of Georgia, Ukraine, Azerbaijan and Moldova started in 1996 in Vienna, Austria, where the four states proposed common goals and initiatives. During the Summit of Council of Europe in 1997, the Presidents of these states expressed their interest in developing regional cooperation. On 24 April in 1999, GUAM was expanded by one more member state – Uzbekistan and was renamed to GUUAM. The September 11 terrorist attack contributed to Uzbekistan's decision to cease its membership in GUAM. In 2006, the name was changed to The Organization for Democracy and Economic Development.

== Heydar Aliyev and GUAM ==
Heydar Aliyev took part in Washington Summit in 1999 and Yalta Summits in 2001 and 2002 of GUAM. According to him, the organization is based on geographical principles and most of all on cooperation through Transcaucasian highway and serves economic goals of its member states. On 4 May 2011 Heydar Aliyev met the leaders of chambers of comers of GUUAM member states and other countries. In September 2011, Baku hosted first women's forum for cooperation of member states of GUUAM. Heydar Aliyev met the participants and wished them success in their work.

== Chairmanship of Azerbaijan in GUAM ==
The chairmanship of Azerbaijan in GUAM commenced on July 19, 2007, at Baku summit and lasted till Batumi Summit on 1 July 2008. Baku summit was held under the motto “GUAM: Bringing Continents together”. The importance of the long-term development and advantages of cooperation with partner countries was reflected in The Programme of the Republic of Azerbaijan and the program served as a basis for activities of organization in 2007–2008.

=== Ilham Aliyev and GUAM ===
The Chairman of GUAM summit in Batumi Azerbaijani President Ilham Aliyev made a speech: “Noting the development of cooperation within GUAM, President Ilham Aliyev said that GUAM has developing links with international organizations. Azerbaijan is currently standing in the way of intensive economic development, has become a global energy and transport corridor and contributes to the development of regional cooperation in various sectors of the economy”.

== Differences of Azerbaijan and other GUAM countries ==
All GUAM countries are dependent on imports of oil and gas from Russia. Meanwhile, Azerbaijan has oil and gas reserves, the exports of which go through Russia. Azerbaijan has oil pipelines in its territory that need to be protected by military, however Moldova and Ukraine do not share such interest.

== High level meeting ==
High-Level Meeting was held in 2017On March 27, prime-ministers of Ukraine, Georgia and Moldova and the deputy prime minister of Azerbaijan held a meeting in Kyiv. In comparison, with its first meeting in 2008, the group moved away from anti-Russia strategy and discussed economic issues such as regional trade agreement and transportation corridor. During the meeting, Azerbaijan called GUAM to increase its attention to trade and transportation. The representative of Azerbaijan pointed out that the work of transport corridor has accelerated in both bilateral and multilateral formats. Azerbaijan also has interest in revitalizing GUAM as an organization for economic cooperation and as a platform for resolving conflicts that exist in the GUAM area. “First and foremost, it is necessary to combine efforts to resolve existing conflicts in the GUAM area,” Altay Efendiyev, GUAM's secretary general and an Azerbaijani diplomat, said in December. Azerbaijan also called GUAM to increase its attention to trade and transportation.

== See also ==
- Azerbaijan
- Moldova
- Georgia
- Ukraine
