= Kanstantsin Dzehtsiarou =

Kanstantsin Dzehtsiarou is a professor of human rights law and Associate Dean for Global Engagement at the University of Liverpool.

== Career ==
Dzehtsiarou has worked for the University of Liverpool since 2015, after positions at the University of Surrey, University College Dublin and Gomel State University in Belarus.

== Works ==
- Dzehtsiarou, Kanstantsin (2015). European Consensus and the Legitimacy of the European Court of Human Rights. Cambridge University Press. ISBN 978-1-107-04103-5.
- de Londras, Fiona; Dzehtsiarou, Kanstantsin (2018). Great Debates on the European Convention on Human Rights. Macmillan International Higher Education. ISBN 978-1-137-60733-1.
- Dzehtsiarou, Kanstantsin (2021). Can the European Court of Human Rights Shape European Public Order?. Cambridge University Press. ISBN 978-1-108-49736-7.
