= 2007 Pitcairnese European Convention on Human Rights referendum =

Unofficial referendum in the Pitcairn Islands

An unofficial referendum on the European Convention on Human Rights was held in the Pitcairn Islands on 18 July 2007. Voters were given the option to adopt the European Convention on Human Rights (ECHR), the islands' own Human Rights Charter, a combination of the two or neither of them. A majority voted to adopt the ECHR alone.

== Results ==
| Choice | Votes | % |
|---|---|---|
| ECHR alone | 14 | 66.67 |
| ECHR and Pitcairn Human Rights Charter | 7 | 33.33 |
| Pitcairn Human Rights Charter | 0 | 0.00 |
| None | 0 | 0.00 |
| Total | 21 | 100 |
Source: Pitcairn News

== See also ==
- Territorial scope of European Convention on Human Rights
