= European Union and the European Convention on Human Rights =

Plan for EU accession to the ECHR

The European Union's (EU) Treaty of Lisbon, in force since 1 December 2009, requires the EU to accede to the European Convention on Human Rights (ECHR). Article 6 of the consolidated Treaty on European Union states "The Union shall accede to the European Convention for the Protection of Human Rights and Fundamental Freedoms. Such accession shall not affect the Union's competences as defined in the Treaties." The EU would thus be subject to its human rights law and external monitoring as its member states currently are. It is further proposed that the EU join as a member of the Council of Europe now that it has attained a single legal personality in the Lisbon Treaty.

Protocol No. 14 of the ECHR entered into force on 1 June 2010. It allows the European Union to accede to the European Convention on Human Rights.

On 5 April 2013, negotiators from the European Union and the Council of Europe finalised a draft agreement for the accession of the EU to the European Convention on Human Rights. As next steps, it is required that the European Court of Justice (ECJ) provides an opinion, subsequently that the EU member states provide unanimous support, that the European Parliament provides two-thirds majority support, and that the agreement is ratified by the parliaments of the Council of Europe's member states.

However, a few months later, the ECJ declared (Opinion 2/13) the draft agreement to be incompatible with Article 6(2) of the Treaty of European Union, thus bringing the accession process to a halt. In 2020, negotiations resumed for EU accession after a multi-year pause following the ECJ opinion. All 27 EU member states are parties to the European Convention on Human Rights, which includes all 46 member states of the Council of Europe.

== Relationship between the two European courts ==
The relationship between the ECJ and the ECtHR is potentially an issue in European Union law and human rights law. The ECJ rules on EU law while the ECtHR rules on the ECHR, which covers the 46 member states of the Council of Europe. Cases cannot be brought in the ECtHR against EU institutions (as the EU is not a member in its own right), but the ECtHR has ruled that states that are members of both organisations cannot escape their human rights obligations by saying that they were implementing EU law.

=== Opinion of the European Court of Justice ===
On 18 December 2014 and in response to a reference by the European Commission, the Court of Justice gave its opinion on the European Union's accession to the ECHR. Among other factors, ECJ noted that to do so would give an external body the power to review the application of EU law.

ECJ gives the European Convention on Human Rights "special significance" as a "guiding principle" in its case law. The European Court of Justice uses a set of general principles of law to guide its decision-making process. One such principle is respect for fundamental rights, seen in Article 6(2) of the Treaty Establishing the European Union (Maastricht Treaty): "The Union shall respect fundamental rights, as guaranteed by the European Convention for the Protection of Human Rights and Fundamental Freedoms signed in Rome on 4 November 1950 and as they result from the constitutional traditions common to the Member States, as general principles of Community law." Within this framework, the European Court of Justice uses all treaties that the Member States of the European Union have signed or participated in as interpretive tools for the content and scope of "fundamental rights", while holding the European Convention on Human Rights as a document with "special significance."

As seen in Article 6(2) of the Maastricht Treaty, quoted above, the European Union is bound to respect fundamental rights principles. This means that the institutions of the European Union must not violate human rights, as defined by European Union law, and also that the Member States of the European Union must not violate European Union human rights principles when they implement Union legislation or act pursuant to Union law. This obligation is in addition to the Member States' pre-existing obligations to follow the rulings of the European Court of Human Rights in everything they do.

In practice, this means that the Court of Justice weaves the Convention principles throughout its reasoning. For example, in the Baumbast case, the Court held that when a child has a right of residence in a Member State according to Union law, this also means that his parent(s) should also have a right of residence due to the principle of respect for family life enshrined in Article 8 of the European Convention on Human Rights.

=== Jurisdiction of the European Court of Human Rights ===
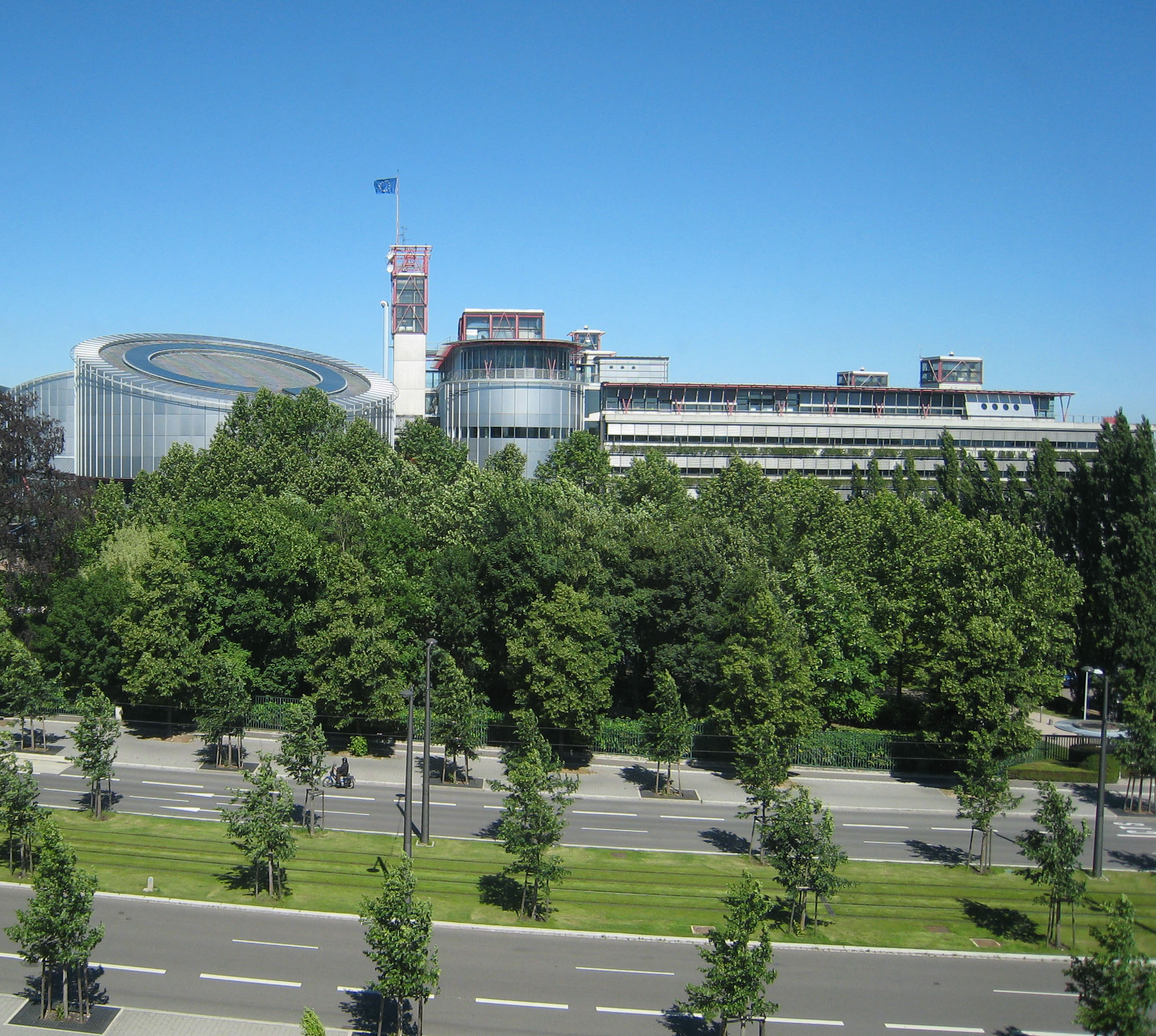
The ECHR in Strasbourg

Prior to the entry into force on 1 June 2010 of Protocol No. 14 to the Convention for the Protection of Human Rights and Fundamental Freedoms, the EU could not accede to the convention, and thus the European Court of Human Rights did not have jurisdiction to rule on cases brought against the EU. However, the ECHR has been prepared to hold individual EU member states liable for human rights' violations committed within their jurisdictions, even when they were just complying with a mandatory provision of EU law.

=== 2023 Agreement ===
On 17 March 2023, the Draft agreement on the accession of the European Union to the Convention for the Protection of Human Rights and Fundamental Freedoms was adopted. This draft agreement would allow the European Union to take part in the defence of respondent States before the European Court of Human Rights (ECtHR) through a co-respondent mechanism. Likewise, the European Union would accede to the Convention as well as to its Additional Protocol No. 1 and No. 6, but not to No. 13, concerning the total abolition of the death penalty, even though it has already been ratified by all its Member States. As this is an amending protocol, all States Parties to the Convention will have to ratify it for it to enter into force.

This draft requires the referral of the matter to the CJEU and the obtaining of a favourable opinion before the signature procedure can begin. The time between this referral and the delivery of the opinion is estimated at between 18 and 24 months. This referral ultimately took place on 26 January 2026.

== See also ==
- Council of Europe–European Union relations
- European Union and the International Criminal Court
- Human rights in Europe
