= Opinion 2/13 =

- Court: Court of Justice of the European Union

Keywords
- Human rights

Opinion 2/13 (2014) is an EU law case determined by the European Court of Justice, concerning the accession of the European Union to the European Convention on Human Rights, and more generally the relationship between the European Court of Justice and European Court of Human Rights.

== Facts ==
In 2014, the European Commission asked the full court of the ECJ whether, in its view, the 2013 Draft Agreement between the European Union and the Council of Europe on accession of the EU to the European Convention on Human Rights was compatible with the Treaties.

== Opinion of the Court ==
The Court of Justice held that the EU could not accede to the ECHR under the Draft Agreement. It held the Agreement was incompatible with TEU article 6(2). Its reasons suggested the Draft Agreement (a) undermined the Court of Justice's autonomy; (b) allowed for a second dispute resolution mechanism among member states, against the treaties; (c) the "co-respondent" system, which allowed the EU and a member state to be sued together, allowed the ECtHR to illegitimately interpret EU law and allocate responsibility between the EU and member states; (d) did not allow the Court of Justice to decide if an issue of law was already dealt with, before the ECtHR heard a case; and (e) the ECtHR was illegitimately being given power of judicial review over the Common Foreign and Security Policy.

153. Before any analysis of the Commission's request can be undertaken, it must be noted as a preliminary point that, unlike the position under Community law in force when the Court delivered Opinion 2/94 (EU:C:1996:140), the accession of the EU to the ECHR has, since the entry into force of the Treaty of Lisbon, had a specific legal basis in the form of Article 6 TEU.
154. That accession would, however, still be characterised by significant distinctive features.
155. Ever since the adoption of the ECHR, it has only been possible for State entities to be parties to it, which explains why, to date, it has been binding only on States. This is also confirmed by the fact that, to enable the accession; of the EU to proceed, not only has Article 59 of the ECHR been amended, but the agreement envisaged itself contains a series of amendments of the ECHR that are to make accession operational within the system established by the ECHR itself.
156. Those amendments are warranted precisely because, unlike any other Contracting Party, the EU is, under international law, precluded by its very nature from being considered a State.
157. As the Court of Justice has repeatedly held, the founding treaties of the EU, unlike ordinary international treaties, established a new legal order, possessing its own institutions, for the benefit of which the Member States thereof have limited their sovereign rights, in ever wider fields, and the subjects of which comprise not only those States but also their nationals (see, in particular, judgments in van Gend & Loos, 26/62, EU:C:1963:1, p. 12, and Costa, 6/64, EU:C:1964:66, p. 593, and Opinion 1/09, EU:C:2011:123, paragraph 65).
158. The fact that the EU has a new kind of legal order, the nature of which is peculiar to the EU, its own constitutional framework and founding principles, a particularly sophisticated institutional structure and a full set of legal rules to ensure its operation, has consequences as regards the procedure for and conditions of accession to the ECHR.
159. It is precisely in order to ensure that that situation is taken into account that the Treaties make accession subject to compliance with various conditions.
160. Thus, first of all, having provided that the EU is to accede to the ECHR, Article 6(2) TEU makes clear at the outset, in the second sentence, that '[s]uch accession shall not affect the Union's competences as defined in the Treaties'.
161. Next, Protocol No 8 EU, which has the same legal value as the Treaties, provides in particular that the accession agreement is to make provision for preserving the specific characteristics of the EU and EU law and ensure that accession does not affect the competences of the EU or the powers of its institutions, or the situation of Member States in relation to the ECHR, or indeed Article 344 TFEU.
162. Lastly, by the Declaration on Article 6(2) of the Treaty on European Union, the Intergovernmental Conference which adopted the Treaty of Lisbon agreed that accession must be arranged in such a way as to preserve the specific features of EU law.
163. In performing the task conferred on it by the first subparagraph of Article 19(1) TEU, the Court of Justice must review, in the light, in particular, of those provisions, whether the legal arrangements proposed in respect of the EU's accession to the ECHR are in conformity with the requirements laid down and, more generally, with the basic constitutional charter, the Treaties (judgment in Les Verts v Parliament, 294/83, EU:C:1986:166, paragraph 23).

[...]

a) The specific characteristics and the autonomy of EU law

179. It must be borne in mind that, in accordance with Article 6(3) TEU, fundamental rights, as guaranteed by the ECHR, constitute general principles of the EU's law. However, as the EU has not acceded to the ECHR, the latter does not constitute a legal instrument which has been formally incorporated into the legal order of the EU (see, to that effect, judgments in Kamberaj, C‑571/10, EU:C:2012:233, paragraph 60, and Åkerberg Fransson, EU:C:2013:105, paragraph 44).
180. By contrast, as a result of the EU's accession the ECHR, like any other international agreement concluded by the EU, would, by virtue of Article 216(2) TFEU, be binding upon the institutions of the EU and on its Member States, and would therefore form an integral part of EU law (judgment in Haegeman, 181/73, EU:C:1974:41, paragraph 5; Opinion 1/91, EU:C:1991:490, paragraph 37; judgments in IATA and ELFAA, C‑344/04, EU:C:2006:10, paragraph 36, and Air Transport Association of America and Others, C‑366/10, EU:C:2011:864, paragraph 73).
181. Accordingly, the EU, like any other Contracting Party, would be subject to external control to ensure the observance of the rights and freedoms the EU would undertake to respect in accordance with Article 1 of the ECHR. In that context, the EU and its institutions, including the Court of Justice, would be subject to the control mechanisms provided for by the ECHR and, in particular, to the decisions and the judgments of the ECtHR.
182. The Court of Justice has admittedly already stated in that regard that an international agreement providing for the creation of a court responsible, for the interpretation of its provisions and whose decisions are binding on the institutions, including the Court of Justice, is not, in principle, incompatible with EU law; that is particularly the case where, as in this instance, the conclusion of such an agreement is provided for by the Treaties themselves. The competence of the EU in the field of international relations and its capacity to conclude international agreements necessarily entail the power to submit to the decisions of a court which is created or designated by such agreements as regards the interpretation and application of their provisions (see Opinions 1/91, EU:C:1991:490, paragraphs 40 and 70, and 1/09, EU:C:2011:123, paragraph 74).
183. Nevertheless, the Court of Justice has also declared that an international agreement may affect its own powers only if the indispensable conditions for safeguarding the essential character of those powers are satisfied and, consequently, there is no adverse effect on the autonomy of the EU legal order (see Opinions 1/00, EU:C:2002:231, paragraphs 21, 23 and 26, and 1/09, EU:C:2011:123, paragraph 76; see also, to that effect, judgment in Kadi and Al Barakaat International Foundation v Council and Commission, EU:C:2008:461, paragraph 282).
184. In particular, any action by the bodies given decision-making powers by the ECHR, as provided for in the agreement envisaged, must not have the effect of binding the EU and its institutions, in the exercise of their internal powers, to a particular interpretation of the rules of EU law (see Opinions 1/91, EU:C:1991:490, paragraphs 30 to 35, and 1/00, EU:C:2002:231, paragraph 13).

[...]

187. ... Article 53 of the Charter provides that nothing therein is to be interpreted as restricting or adversely affecting fundamental rights as recognised, in their respective fields of application, by EU law and international law and by international agreements to which the EU or all the Member States are party, including the ECHR, and by the Member States' constitutions.
188. The Court of Justice has interpreted that provision as meaning that the application of national standards of protection of fundamental rights must not compromise the level of protection provided for by the Charter or the primacy, unity and effectiveness of EU law (judgment in Melloni, EU:C:2013:107, paragraph 60).

[...]

199. By failing to make any provision in respect of the relationship between the mechanism established by Protocol No 16 and the preliminary ruling procedure provided for in Article 267 TFEU, the agreement envisaged is liable adversely to affect the autonomy and effectiveness of the latter procedure.
200. Having regard to the foregoing, it must be held that the accession of the EU to the ECHR as envisaged by the draft agreement is liable adversely to affect the specific characteristics of EU law and its autonomy.

b) Article 344 TFEU

201. The Court has consistently held that an international agreement cannot affect the allocation of powers fixed by the Treaties or, consequently, the autonomy of the EU legal system, observance of which is ensured by the Court. That principle is notably enshrined in Article 344 TFEU, according to which Member States undertake not to submit a dispute concerning the interpretation or application of the Treaties to any method of settlement other than those provided for therein ...

[...]

207. Article 5 of the draft agreement merely reduces the scope of the obligation laid down by Article 55 of the ECHR, but still allows for the possibility that the EU or Member States might submit an application to the ECtHR, under Article 33 of the ECHR, concerning an alleged violation thereof by a Member State or the EU, respectively, in conjunction with EU law.
208. The very existence of such a possibility undermines the requirement set out in Article 344 TFEU.

[...]

c) The co-respondent mechanism

215. The co-respondent mechanism has been introduced, as is apparent from paragraph 39 of the draft explanatory report, in order to "avoid gaps in participation, accountability and enforceability in the [ECHR] system", gaps which, owing to the specific characteristics of the EU, might result from its accession to the ECHR.
216. In addition, that mechanism also has the aim of ensuring that, in accordance with the requirements of Article 1(b) of Protocol No 8 EU, proceedings by non-Member States and individual applications are correctly addressed to Member States and/or the EU as appropriate.

[...]

235. Having regard to the foregoing, it must be held that the arrangements for the operation of the co-respondent mechanism laid down by the agreement envisaged do not ensure that the specific characteristics of the EU and EU law are preserved.

d) The procedure for the prior involvement of the Court of Justice

236. It is true that the necessity for the procedure for the prior involvement of the Court of Justice is, as paragraph 65 of the draft explanatory report shows, linked to respect for the subsidiary nature of the control mechanism established by the ECHR, as referred to in paragraph 19 of this Opinion. Nevertheless, it should equally be noted that that procedure is also necessary for the purpose of ensuring the proper functioning of the judicial system of the EU.
237. In that context, the necessity for the prior involvement of the Court of Justice in a case brought before the ECtHR in which EU law is at issue satisfies the requirement that the competences of the EU and the powers of its institutions, notably the Court of Justice, be preserved, as required by Article 2 of Protocol No 8 EU.

[...]

247. Accordingly, limiting the scope of the prior involvement procedure, in the case of secondary law, solely to questions of validity adversely affects the competences of the EU and the powers of the Court of Justice in that it does not allow the Court to provide a definitive interpretation of secondary law in the light of the rights guaranteed by the ECHR.
248. Having regard to the foregoing, it must be held that the arrangements for the operation of the procedure for the prior involvement of the Court of Justice provided for by the agreement envisaged do not enable the specific characteristics of the EU and EU law to be preserved.

e) The specific characteristics of EU law as regards judicial review in CFSP matters

249. It is evident from the second subparagraph of Article 24(1) TEU that, as regards the provisions of the Treaties that govern the CFSP, the Court of Justice has jurisdiction only to monitor compliance with Article 40 TEU and to review the legality of certain decisions as provided for by the second paragraph of Article 275 TFEU.
250. According to the latter provision, the Court of Justice is to have jurisdiction, in particular, to rule on proceedings, brought in accordance with the conditions laid down in the fourth paragraph of Article 263 TFEU, reviewing the legality of decisions providing for restrictive measures against natural or legal persons adopted by the Council on the basis of Chapter 2 of Title V of the EU Treaty.

[...]

257. Therefore, although that is a consequence of the way in which the Court's powers are structured at present, the fact remains that the agreement envisaged fails to have regard to the specific characteristics of EU law with regard to the judicial review of acts, actions or omissions on the part of the EU in CFSP matters.
258. In the light of all the foregoing considerations, it must be held that the agreement envisaged is not compatible with Article 6(2) TEU or with Protocol No 8 EU in that:
  - it is liable adversely to affect the specific characteristics and the autonomy of EU law in so far it does not ensure coordination between Article 53 of the ECHR and Article 53 of the Charter, does not avert the risk that the principle of Member States' mutual trust under EU law may be undermined, and makes no provision in respect of the relationship between the mechanism established by Protocol No 16 and the preliminary ruling procedure provided for in Article 267 TFEU;
  - it is liable to affect Article 344 TFEU in so far as it does not preclude the possibility of disputes between Member States or between Member States and the EU concerning the application of the ECHR within the scope ratione materiae of EU law being brought before the ECtHR;
  - it does not lay down arrangements for the operation of the co-respondent mechanism and the procedure for the prior involvement of the Court of Justice that enable the specific characteristics of the EU and EU law to be preserved; and
  - it fails to have regard to the specific characteristics of EU law with regard to the judicial review of acts, actions or omissions on the part of the EU in CFSP matters in that it entrusts the judicial review of some of those acts, actions or omissions exclusively to a non-EU body.

== See also ==
- European Union law
