= Benthem v Netherlands =

Submitted 20 March 1984 Decided 23 October 1985
- Full case name: Benthem v Netherlands
- ECLI: ECLI:CE:ECHR:1985:1023JUD000884880

Court composition
- Judge-Rapporteur; M.A. Eissen
- President; R. Ryssdal
- Judges: W. Ganshof-Van der Meersch; J. Cremona; T. Vilhjálmsson; D. Bindschedler-Robert; G. Lagergren; F. Gölcüklü; F. Matscher; J. Pinheiro Farinha; L.E. Pettiti; B. Walsh; V. Evans; R. MacDonald; C. Russo; R. Bernhardt; J. Gersing; C.W. Dubbink

Legislation affecting
- Art. 6 ECHR

Benthem v Netherlands was a European Court of Human Rights case on the right to a fair trial. It concerned the grant of a permit by a municipal authority, with which the Dutch Government, then referred to as the Crown in legal cases, disagreed. Several legal proceedings were brought in respect of this permit, which were ultimately decided by the Government itself, under the Kroonberoep procedure ('Crown appeal').

Benthem eventually filed an application before the Court and claimed that the Government had denied him the right to a fair trial of Article 6(1) of the European Convention on Human Rights (ECHR), arguing that the Government was not an "independent and impartial tribunal". The Court held that there was a violation of Article 6(1) ECHR.

The ruling of the Court led to substantial changes of Dutch administrative law, most notable the elimination of the Kroonberoep and the establishment of a separate court procedure.

== Facts ==
Albert Benthem used to own and run a garage in Noordwolde, Netherlands. In April 1976, he applied to the municipal authorities for a permit to establish and maintain an installation for the delivery of liquefied petroleum gas (LPG), following the Nuisance Act (Hinderwet). After the application was made public, three neighbours were concerned about the safety of the installation. A regional health inspector recommended denying Benthem's application. Despite the health inspector's advice, the permit was granted, albeit with several conditions to counter possible dangers.

The health inspector lodged an appeal with the Government, the so-called Kroonberoep. The municipality informed Benthem of this appeal, but stated he could still erect his installation. The Council of State, after hearing both parties and seeking advice from the Director General for Environmental Protection, gave the Minister of Public Health the recommendation to refuse the licence. Consequently, the Government (the Crown) held that the permit should not have been granted and quashed it by royal decree.

During that time, Benthem had already established the LPG installation. The municipal authorities ordered him to cease operation. His appeal against that decision, which was also a Kroonberoep, was denied by decree. The municipal authorities eventually decided to close the installation themselves. An appeal against that second decision was quashed on formal grounds by the Council of State.

Benthem filed an application with the European Commission of Human Rights. He claimed that a dispute over civil rights and obligations was involved and his case should have been heard by an independent and impartial tribunal as guaranteed under the right to a fair trial of Article 6(1) ECHR.

The Commission held that Article 6(1) of the Convention was not applicable to his case. Both the Government and Benthem appealed to the European Court of Human Rights. By that time, Benthem had been declared bankrupt.

== Judgment ==
The Court held that there was a violation of Article 6(1) ECHR.

It first assessed the applicability of Article 6(1), namely whether the dispute at hand concerned the "determination of [the applicant's] civil rights and obligations". The Dutch Government argued that the case at hand did not, since it failed to relate directly to the conclusion of contracts, to the right to enjoy one's property (since the Nuisance Act conditions this right), or to the right to carry out business activities (since Benthem could continue to sell LPG on a different site presenting less risks). On the contrary, the case concerned a 'new' and provisional right created by means of a license, which the Crown could therefore reverse. These conclusions were shared by the Commission. On the contrary, the Court established the existence of a genuine and serious dispute that concerned the "actual existence" of the right to a permit, which affected Benthem's ability to exploit his installation. This right to a permit has a civil character, since it is closely associated to the applicant's right to use his possessions and the exercise of his commercial activities.

Secondly, the Court considered the proceedings in front of the Council of State and the proceedings in front of the Crown. The Government argued that the Council of State acted as a court because it examined all the aspects of the case and came to a decision (provided the likelihood that the Minister of Public Health would follow its recommendation to the letter). However, the Court assessed that the Council of State only provides advice without binding force and could therefore not fulfill the role of tribunal with regards to Article 6(1). As for the appeals the Crown, the Court considers them of administrative rather than judicial nature, since the royal decree is an administrative act not susceptible to review by a judicial body, and the appeals were not lodged to an independent body.

Thus, the Court held eleven votes to six that Article 6(1) was both applicable and violated, and Benthem had been denied a right to a fair trial.
