= Article 2 of the European Convention on Human Rights =

Second article of the European Convention on Human Rights

In the European Convention on Human Rights, Article 2 protects the right to life. The article contains a limited exception for the cases of lawful executions and sets out strictly controlled circumstances in which the deprivation of life may be justified. The Court subsequently held that Article 2 no longer permitted the death penalty and that it was contrary to Article 3. No State Party to the Convention may therefore resort to the death penalty, whether or not it has ratified Protocol No. 13.

The European Court of Human Rights has commented that "Article 2 ranks as one of the most fundamental provisions in the Convention". The obligations on a State under Article 2 consist of three principal aspects: the duty to refrain from unlawful deprivation of life; the duty to investigate suspicious deaths; and in certain circumstances, a positive obligation to take steps to prevent avoidable losses of life.

== Text ==
Article 2 – Right to life

1. Everyone's right to life shall be protected by law. No one shall be deprived of his life intentionally save in the execution of a sentence of a court following his conviction of a crime for which this penalty is provided by law.
2. Deprivation of life shall not be regarded as inflicted in contravention of this article when it results from the use of force which is no more than absolutely necessary:
  1. in defence of any person from unlawful violence;
  2. in order to effect a lawful arrest or to prevent the escape of a person lawfully detained;
  3. in action lawfully taken for the purpose of quelling a riot or insurrection.

== Deprivation of life ==
The first, and most obvious obligation under Article 2 is for the state, through its agents, to refrain from itself causing the deprivation of life, that is to say that domestic law must regulate the permissible use of lethal force by agents of the state. The court first considered the obligations imposed by Article 2 in the case of McCann and Others v United Kingdom brought by the relatives of three individuals shot by members of the SAS in Gibraltar.

This case imposes two obligations to the State:

1. To conduct a full, open and transparent investigations into why the public bodies have taken a life. This should be public, independent and should involve members of the family of the victims (R (Amin) v S.O.S. Home Dept).
2. A positive duty to refrain from unlawful killing, better expressed as the "Duty of command, control and training" i.e. to ensure those who take the life (such as police marksmen) are highly trained and overseen at all times.

If the state has not followed these obligations then it will be found to be an unlawful killing. Further reading of cases on the matter include: Kelly and Others v UK; Osman v UK; McKerr v UK; Jordan v UK; Shanaghan v UK; and R(Amin) v SOS Home Dept itself.

== Positive duty to protect life in certain circumstances ==
Article 2 has been interpreted to include the positive obligation of the state to ensure preventive measures are taken to protect citizens. The leading case on the matter is Osman v UK which overruled the UK court's decision in Hill v West Yorkshire as to the fact that public bodies could not be held to be negligent if they had done all that would be reasonably expected of them to avoid immediate and real risk of life. Whether authorities have done this is decided case by case. In the case of Osman v UK, the claimant contended that the police authority should have been more alert to the obsessive behaviour of Paget-Lewis and his targeting of their son, however there was found to be no risk of life endangerment.

Some cases establish further obligations for states. For instance, LCB v UK establishes a positive obligation for states to take "appropriate steps to safeguard the lives of those within their jurisdiction."The case entails the applicant's complaint concerning a failure to monitor radiation exposure of her father, who was a serviceman present during the Christmas Island nuclear tests in 1957/58; the applicant was diagnosed with leukaemia as a child and since discovered a large incidence of cancer within the children of these veterans. She claimed that the State had failed to warn her parents of the risk to her health caused by her father's exposure, and that they failed to monitor her father's exposure levels, therefore breaching Article 2 of the Convention. There was held to be no violation of Article 2 here.

Similarly, in the case of Öneryildiz v Turkey, the Grand Chamber also emphasised the positive obligation on the State to take the 'appropriate steps to safeguard the lives of those within their jurisdiction for the purposes of Article 2' as well as stating that the Article 2 protection 'could be relied on in connection with the operation of waste-collection sites, on account of the potential risks'. Dangerous industrial activity therefore must be regulated, licensed and monitored.

Makaratzis v Greece pushes these obligations further, so that the state must have mechanisms to deter offences against people. This was initially applied to the use of firearms. Although the court recognised the defensive benefits in gun ownership, it found a much larger threat in unchecked gun use. This case highlighted that Article 2 covers not only intentional killing but where force is used which may unintentionally kill. It was held to be a violation as chaotic gun use by the police force put the applicant's life at risk.

== Preventative measures to protect life ==
The criteria of positive obligations now references as the Osman obligation, as established in Osman v UK, have been used in further cases as follows:

- Gongadze v Ukraine – The court found a breach of duty to take preventative measures, from the applicant's complaints that under Articles 2 and 3 of the Convention, the State had failed to protect her husband's life from the police officers who were involved in his disappearance and murder.
- Akkoç v Turkey – The applicant's husband received harassment and death threats which were reported and ignored, and following this he was shot dead. There was a breach of the Osman criteria as authorities failed to satisfy their positive obligation to protect him when his life was at risk, violating Article 2 of the Convention.

The Osman obligation also applies to persons in detention. Some examples of this include:

- Edward v UK – There was a failure to pass on information regarding the prisoner's mental state as well as a failure to protect the cellmate who was then murdered by them. In detention cases there is a very high burden of proof on the State to show they took reasonable steps to protect prisoners in custody.
- Keenan v UK – Outlined the idea that preventative steps should be taken to care and watch out for suicidal prisoners.
- Saoud v France – In this case a mentally ill person was arrested with extreme force and held down for thirty minutes, causing his death by asphyxiation. The authorities had an obligation to protect his health as a person who had just been arrested, which includes providing medical care when required.

In health care, an obligation exists to an undefined degree as laid out in Cyprus v Turkey. Although there was found to be no breach, the court acknowledged the obligation of States to safeguard lives within the jurisdiction, by not denying healthcare which is made to be available to the general population.

== Duty to investigate suspicious deaths ==
The Article 1 obligation to secure Convention Rights combined with the Article 3 obligation as set out in LCB to take 'appropriate steps' to protect life, creates a general duty to investigate unnatural deaths for the purposes of creating accountability, and deterring the breach of Article to right to life.

The investigation must be effective, independent and prompt. The duty to investigate is even stronger where the death has occurred whilst a person was detained by the state. The leading authority on this is Salman v Turkey (2000).

The facts of this case include an applicant who, reliant on Article 2, 3 and 13 of the Convention, claimed her husband died by torture in police custody and that she was unable to receive an effective remedy regarding the complaint. It was held that there had been a violation of Article 2 of the Convention, due to authorities' lack of adequate investigation into the suspicious death of Agit Salman in custody.

The case of Calvelli and Ciglio v Italy entailed a delay by police in investigation of a baby's death, causing the prosecution against the negligent doctor to be time-barred. The applicants argued that the procedural delays that created obstacles to prosecution, breached Article 2's requirement that the right to life is protected by law. The case was considered admissible, however in the Grand Chamber there was held to be no violation, as the applicants waived their right to pursue civil proceedings due to a settlement with insurers.

The obligation to investigate is a general obligation for deaths, including killings by government agents (as seen in McCann v UK), private killings (as seen in Menson v UK) and deaths caused by known persons (as seen in Togcu v Turkey, Kaya v Turkey and Yasa v Turkey). The case of Yasa v Turkey shows that a state of emergency does not excuse this obligation.

These investigations need not be criminal investigations depending on the circumstances. For example, the case of Powell v UK showed that disciplinary investigations of professional may be sufficient.

The case of Hugh Jordan v UK states that the investigation can vary so long as it meets the strict requirements of effectiveness.

Effectiveness thus creates certain criteria to be followed:

- Investigators must be 'independent and impartial both at law and in practice' – in the case of Ergi v Turkey there was a breach because the investigators relied solely on evidence provided by the police who were being investigated.
- Ramsahai v Netherlands – evidence provided by the colleagues of those being investigated does not satisfy the requirements for impartial investigations, even as in the case of Jordan v UK, the colleagues where supervised by independent body.
- Jordan v UK – investigation must be adequate, adequacy requires the investigation to show the cause of death and find those responsible for it. The investigation must be fast and reasonably expedient, and legal aid may also need to be provided.
- McKerr v UK – must allow for public scrutiny and provide punishments that would deter others.

== Use of force and exceptions in paragraph 2 ==
This constitutes the negative obligation of the state under the Convention. The states must, under Article 3, refrain from any random deprivation of life. This article, however, offers states a few exceptions to that rule. This constitutes a license to use force and is not to be construed as a license to kill.

The exceptions are well defined and are subject to a very narrow interpretation by the Court.

There are three conditions set by the court:

1. The use of force must be absolutely necessary;
2. It must be in defence of a third party;
3. It must be subject to a proper and effective investigation which is both impartial and independent.

Key rulings in this matter are McCann and Others v United Kingdom, Makaratzis v Greece, and Nachova and others v Bulgaria.

Nachova and others v Bulgaria concerns two men who were killed by military police in 1996, and it was alleged by the applicants that the State failed to protect life by law and there was inadequate investigation into the event, therefore breaching Article 2. There was held to be a violation of Article 2 as the deadly force used was not "absolutely necessary" as the two men posed no threat to life and therefore the force used with firearms to arrest was grossly excessive.

== Beginning of life ==
In 1980, the Court ruled out the foetal right to sue the mother carrying the foetus. In Paton v. United Kingdom, it was decided that the life of the foetus is "intimately connected with, and cannot be regarded in isolation from, the life of the pregnant woman" and that a foetus does not have its own rights until it has a separate existence from its mother when it is born. The facts of the case include the applicant who sought an injunction to prevent his pregnant wife from having an abortion, and following the abortion being carried out he complained of a breach of Article 2 of the Convention, for the violation of his unborn child's right to life. The key ruling was Vo v France where the court ruled that due to lack of consensus over the matter in the member states, the court allows a margin of appreciation (usually reserved only for the derogable rights) to each state to determine whether a foetus falls under the protection of Article 2.

The court, as it usually does in such unsettled matters, refrained from clarifying the issue further.

== End of life ==
=== Euthanasia and assisted death ===
Euthanasia is the act of deliberately ending a person's life to relieve suffering. The only countries that have legalised euthanasia are Spain, Belgium, Luxembourg, the Netherlands, Canada and Colombia. Some countries provide legal access to assisted dying, which is completely voluntary and under the control of the dying person rather than a doctor; these countries include: New Zealand (for terminally ill adults), Australia, Canada, Switzerland (however euthanasia is illegal) and some states in the USA including Oregon, Washington and California.

In the United Kingdom, the Suicide Act 1961 legalised the attempt to take one's own life. However, it remains an offence to assist the suicide of another person.

The case of Pretty v UK was brought before the European Court of Human Rights, to determine whether the claimant's request for her husband to assist her suicide being denied would infringe her Article 2 rights. Despite assisted suicide being illegal in the UK, the reason there was held to be no violation of Article 2 is because this right safeguards lives and does not confer any right to die.

=== Life-sustaining treatment ===
The case of Lambert and Others v France outlines the importance of the margin of appreciation when the court is assessing the positive obligation of the State under Article 2. The applicants alleged a breach of Articles 2, 3 and 8 of the Convention. The Conseil d'État held that the patient's doctor must decide whether artificial nutrition should be withdrawn based not only on medical factors, but any previous wishes expressed by the patient, and the views of the patient's family members (the withdrawal having been agreed with by his wife and six siblings), and that the Dr Kariger did comply with all requirements and therefore his decision of withdrawal was lawful and not a breach of Article 2.

The case of Parfitt v UK also concerns a complaint against Article 2 of the Convention, with the applicant claiming that withdrawing her daughter's life-sustaining treatment would be a violation of her daughter's Article 2 rights, the applicant's daughter being in a permanent vegetative state with no chance of improvement. Following the High Court's declaration in January 2021 that it would not be unlawful for her hospital to withdraw treatment, the applicant obtained an interim measure under Rule 39 of the Rules of Court (an urgent measure which applies where there is imminent risk of irreparable damage: Paladi v Moldova). The applicant's complaints were held inadmissible as her complaint of an Article 2 breach was manifestly ill-founded.

== Case law ==
=== Abortion ===
Article 2 does not recognise an absolute right to life. In abortion cases there is a wide margin of appreciation because of the lack of consensus in Europe.

In the case of Paton v United Kingdom it was established that if Article 2 were to include in its protection the life of a foetus, then abortion would have to be prohibited even in life-threatening circumstances. As states in the judgment of the case "this would mean that the 'unborn life' of the foetus would be regarded as of a higher value than the life of the pregnant woman".

- X v UK – abortion of 10-week-old foetus to protect physical and mental health of women was not a breach.
- H v Norway – abortion of 12-week-old foetus for social reasons, to prevent putting the women in a "difficult situation in life" (literal interpretation of Norwegian statute) was not a breach, again due to lack of consensus in Europe on the issue of abortion. The case was brought by the expectant father who did not want the abortion carried out.
- VO v France – as a result of medical negligence damaging the amniotic sac, a termination of the pregnancy was required. The Court had not considered whether an unborn child has rights under Article 2 and some case law indicated they would not have a right to life. The Court did not consider the right to life issue, rather stating that civil remedies were available and thus that satisfied the requirement for legal and administrative framework as set out in LBC v UK.
- Evans v UK – the claimant complained of a breach of Article 2 of the Convention, following a requirement to destroy embryos after her former partner withdrew his consent to their storage and usage. The same margin of appreciation doctrine was used as in VO v France, with specific reference to lack of European consensus thus necessitating a wide margin of appreciation. The Court reaffirmed the idea that an embryo cannot have claimed on its behalf a right to life under Article 2, and thus there was no violation. The ECHR cannot impose requirements, rather it protects minimum rights common to all the signatory states.

=== Taking life by force of arms ===
The taking of life by state agents is strictly prohibited except for exceptional circumstances, whilst private killings require investigation and legal and administrative protection.

In Makaratzis v Greece a car chase by police led to them shooting wildly at the car. No death resulted but there was found to be liability as the nature of the incident could have been lethal, thus the inadequacy of planning and conduct of the officers constituted a breach.

Killings by state agents are notoriously difficult to prove in many situations. In cases where a person is taken into custody and dies, it is for the state to show how he died, as was the case in Salman v Turkey. Per Demiray v Turkey the explanation must be satisfactory.

Akkoc v Turkey invoked a killing by a suspected state agent. The state refused to support the investigation and provide evidence, thus the court turned the burden of proof on the state to justify withholding information. In Estimarov v Russia it was held that reasons must be provided for the killing of the suspect.

The burden of proof issue is a difficult one which is somewhat mitigated by the fact that the court finds breaches in failures to investigate. Thus if a death occurs the state is obligated to investigate it, which it is unlikely to do where one of its agents is responsible, thus there is a breach. The investigation must also be effective, as in Jordan v UK. In other words, the state is caught between a rock and hard place.

In cases where persons have been detained by security forces and have subsequently disappeared, the court has stated that two criteria must be satisfied:

1. it must be shown beyond reasonable doubt that the missing person was detained by security forces or state agents.
2. there must be "sufficient circumstantial evidence, based on concrete elements, on which it may be concluded beyond reasonable doubt that the person is dead" (Cakici v Turkey).

If these requirements are met, the burden of proof turns to the state to explain what has happened to the person.

The main problem here is that there is often no record of arrest, and further no way of obtaining circumstantial evidence. In Kurt v Turkey, the son of the applicant was arrested by security forces. The state claimed the person had instead left with rebel fighters. The court had little evidence to show where the son had been taken and what happened to him. He had been missing for 4 1/2 years. The court refused to recognize that the arrest by the security forces was in its context life-threatening and thus refused to shift the burden onto the state.

- Timurtas v Turkey – the applicant's son was arrested by security forces but unlike Kurt, he was taken to an identifiable location and was seen by other detainees in the facility for months. There was also an operational report shown to the court but was contested by the State. The court requested the state provide evidence to support its claims that the operational report was fake; the state refused on security grounds. Thus the court turned the burden of proof on the state in order to show what had happened to the missing detainee and subsequently found a breach of article 3. The case is distinguished from Kurt because the applicant was missing for 6 years. Further, in the context of southeast Turkey, persons arrested on suspicion of having links to PKK rebels were shown in other cases such as Kaya, Yasa Kilic etc. to be life-threatening. The abducted person was suspected of these links. Thus the circumstantial evidence was sufficient to turn the burden of proof. The requirement for circumstantial evidence decreases with the number of years the missing person is unaccounted for, provided he was detained by the state.
- Cyprus v Turkey – The court was not ready to presume death for 1700 civilians that disappeared when the north was invaded.
- Baysayeva v Russia – This case totally discarded Kurt and went further than Timurtas in that there was no circumstantial evidence to presume death. The Court simply relied on the fact that the abduction had been by unidentified state agents in uniform. There was no record of arrest and a procedural failure to investigate, thus it was accepted that the arrest was life-threatening in the circumstances.

=== Abolition of death penalty ===
In its 2010 judgment in Al-Saadoon and Mufdhi v. the United Kingdom, the Court held that Article 3 of the Convention prohibits the death penalty, owing to the general trend towards its abolition among the states parties to the Convention. This prohibition applies to all states parties to the Convention, including those which have not ratified Protocol 13. States parties are also prohibited from extraditing individuals who risk being sentenced to death.

=== Death from permitted use of force ===
- McCann and Others v United Kingdom (1995) 21 EHRR 97 – force applied must be no more than 'absolutely necessary' meaning that it must be strictly proportionate to the achieve the permitted purpose. This goes beyond proportionality as we find it in Article 8 and others. It is extremely strict with no margin of appreciation afforded. The court simply construes facts as they are and reaches an impartial assessment.

Micheal O'Boyle says that the situation regarding shootings must be judged with the facts of the situation at the time and not ex post facto. This has also been a criticism of dissenting judges in McCann v UK, who stated that the courts should be wary of the benefits of hindsight in their finding of a breach of Article 3 on the case.

The use of deadly force must be lawful at a national level (C v Belgium, Kelly v UK, Stewart v UK) and must meet the requirements of lawfulness as set out in Article 5 and the case of Bozano v France, thus meeting the rule of law requirement as expected in a democratic society so as to allow the citizens to conduct their lives accordingly as stated in Sunday Times v UK.

=== Defence of oneself or of another ===
Firstly, shooting in defence of property is not allowed. The signatory states did not incorporate the 4th derogation of shooting to stop access to certain facilities which was suggested at the time of writing of the treaty.

- McCann v UK – soldiers did not breach article 2, they responded to a threat at the time and their response was lawful; the breach was by the authorities in planning. Firstly, they did not stop the suspects at the border, which they should have. Secondly, they used extremely lethal SAS soldiers who had been trained to kill and informed that the suspects had remote detonators, thus relying on false intelligence which they did not question.
- Andronicou and Constantinou v Cyprus – police commandos raided a flat in which a man was holding his fiancée hostage. No breach was found as the soldiers' shooting and thus killing both persons was in self-defence and defence of the fiancée. There was also no procedural breach of planning as in McCann because the authorities in the circumstances acted proportionally in defence of the fiancée who was in real and immediate danger.
- Gul v Turkey – the raid on a flat suspected to have PKK militants was grossly disproportionate in its use of force.
- Isayeva v Russia – rebels entered a town of 20,000. The Russian security forces responded with artillery and aircraft fire. They made available information to the population regarding a safe passage out of the town. The court found this inadequate whilst also finding the use of such lethal force on a crowded place to be disproportionate especially in peacetime. The breach was as a result of failure of the planners to have regard for civilian lives.
- Isayeva, Yosupova and Bazayeva v Russia – an air force plane reported receiving small arms fire from a convoy, and subsequently got authorization to attack. The air-to-ground missile attack killed scores of people, including the applicants' children. Subsequent investigations showed no presence of fighters in the convoy. The court rejected the state's argument of self-defence, as the use of such firepower was grossly disproportionate.
- Nachova v Bulgaria – it is grossly disproportionate to use lethal force to effect an arrest, as the force cannot be considered absolutely necessary, especially when the person was not posing any threat, simply running away from military police who wanted to arrest him for dereliction of duty. Further, the court ruled in Kelly v UK that to shoot a person when seeking to arrest them defeats the purpose of the mission, which is to bring them before a court. It also rules out any future arrest and the fact that the victim will not get a chance to defend himself in law.

=== Riots and insurrections ===
- Stewart v UK – 150 people throwing missiles at a patrol of soldiers amounted to a riot, although there were no clear criteria in law as to what constitutes a riot. Thus the force used in firing plastic bullets killing a 13-year-old boy was proportionate.
- Gulec v Turkey – a crowd of several thousand throwing missiles at security forces and damaging property was also deemed to be a riot. There was however a breach here as the McCann obligations still apply regarding proportionality. So the security forces had fired shots at the ground near the rioters to scare them off. Ricochet bullets killed the applicant's son. The breach was found in that the authorities had not provided any riot equipment to the security forces even though a state of emergency was declared, thus it was expected that violence would occur. The operation had not been planned so as to minimize risk to the civilians.
- X v Belgium – A police officer shot an innocent bystander in the course of a riot. He had no authorisation to use the weapon, thus his actions were not lawful, therefore there was a clear breach.

== See also ==
- European Convention on Human Rights
- European Court of Human Rights
