= Article 6 of the European Convention on Human Rights =

Provision on the right to a fair trial

Article 6 of the European Convention on Human Rights is a provision of the European Convention which protects the right to a fair trial in criminal law cases and in cases to determine civil rights. It protects the right to a public hearing before an independent and impartial tribunal within a reasonable time, the presumption of innocence, right to silence and other minimum rights for those charged in a criminal case (adequate time and facilities to prepare their defence, access to legal representation, right to examine witnesses against them or have them examined, right to the free assistance of an interpreter).

== Text ==
Article 6 reads as follows.

1. In the determination of his/her civil rights and obligations or of any criminal charge against him/her, everyone is entitled to a fair and public hearing within a reasonable time by an independent and impartial tribunal established by law. Judgment shall be pronounced publicly but the press and public may be excluded from all or part of the trial in the interest of morals, public order or national security in a democratic society, where the interests of juveniles or the protection of the private life of the parties so require, or to the extent strictly necessary in the opinion of the court in special circumstances where publicity would prejudice the interests of justice.
2. Everyone charged with a criminal offence shall be presumed innocent until proven guilty according to law.
3. Everyone charged with a criminal offence has the following minimum rights:
  - (a) to be informed promptly, in a language which he/she understands and in detail, of the nature and cause of the accusation against him/her;
  - (b) to have adequate time and the facilities for the preparation of his/her defence;
  - (c) to defend himself in person or through legal assistance of his/her own choosing or, if he/she has not sufficient means to pay for legal assistance, to be given it free when the interests of justice so require;
  - (d) to examine or have examined witnesses against him/her and to obtain the attendance and examination of witnesses on his/her behalf under the same conditions as witnesses against him/her;
  - (e) to have the free assistance of an interpreter if he/she cannot understand or speak the language used in court.

== Application ==
The concept of "civil rights and obligations" at the beginning of Article 6 applies to ones granted at the level of the Council of Europe, and not at the national level. Accordingly, the applicability of Article 6 is contingent on the existence of a breach of such "civil rights and obligations" regardless of the national classification, a relevant "right" that is breached, and a judgment that provides a decisive outcome from the dispute. Firstly, to determine the existence of a breach, the dispute must have a concrete matter with contentious details (e.g., in Omdahl v. Norway (2021), the court dealt with the matter of time in which the applicant would be entitled to his grandfather's possessions). Thus, relevant violations come from excessive delays, due to the "reasonable time" requirement in civil and criminal proceedings before national courts.

Secondly, although the CoE maintains autonomy under the rights of the ECHR, it still necessitates an arguable basis under the contracting state’s national law. Thus, the breached relevant "right" must be determined, particularly whether an applicant's argument is "sufficiently tenable". The exception to the reliance on national law rights is when the national law provides for a right that is not recognized by the ECtHR. Due to the autonomy of the ECtHR, underscored by the "independent tribunal" requirement, the Court overruled a Turkish decision in Assanidze v. Georgia (2004) and rendered the Turkish military tribunal's decision incompatible with Article 6.

Finally, when assessing the applicability of Article 6 to determine a fair trial right violation, the Court examines whether the "right" at hand is civil under the domestic setting to ascertain a decisive outcome. Like precedents established in other rights guaranteed in the ECtHR, such as non bis in idem, the Court determines violations according to their tangible content and penal repercussions, as opposed to solely off of national statutory provisions. In states that either are negligent in guaranteeing rights relevant to a fair trial or deliberately penalise an actor against the rights that are guaranteed in Article 6, the ECtHR considers such matters to provide a relevant decisive outcome.

== Cases ==
- Colozza v Italy (1985) – Held that when a person is tried in absentia without being aware of the proceedings, the defendant is entitled to a fresh trial when they are made aware.
- Heaney and McGuinness v. Ireland (2000) – Case involving two Irish citizens imprisoned for choosing to remain silent and to use their rights not to incriminate themselves when suspected of an IRA-related terrorist act. "The Court ... finds that the security and public order concerns relied on by the Government cannot justify a provision which extinguishes the very essence of the applicants' rights to silence and against self-incrimination guaranteed by Article 6 § 1 of the Convention."
- García Ruiz v Spain (1999) – The Court applied the fourth-instance doctrine, stating that it is not its function to deal with errors of fact or law allegedly committed by a national court unless and in so far as they may have infringed rights and freedoms protected by the convention.
- Van Kück v Germany (2003) – the court took the approach of considering the merits of the case and in finding a breach based on the fact that the German courts had failed to follow the Strasbourg court's approach to medical necessity on hormone replacement therapy and gender reassignment surgery. This was in line with and an expansion of the earlier ruling in Camilleri v Malta (2000) in which the courts were more willing to consider the merits of the court's decision which compromised fairness, stating that the decision had been "arbitrary or manifestly unreasonable".
- Perez v France (2004) – "the right to a fair trial holds so prominent a place in a democratic society that there can be no justification for interpreting Article 6 § 1 of the Convention restrictively".
- Khamidov v Russia (2007) – the court considered "abundant evidence" contradicting the finding of the national court, with the result that "the unreasonableness of this conclusion is so striking and palpable on the face of it" that the decision was "grossly arbitrary". This once again showed the court's changing stance in considering the actual merits of a case. This therefore illustrates the court is developing an appellate function as opposed to a review function.
- Khlyustov v. Russia (2013) – A person may not claim a violation of the right to a fair trial when he has been acquitted or when proceedings have been discontinued.
- Guðmundur Andri Ástráðsson v. Iceland (2020) – irregular appointment of judges breached the right to tribunal established by law.
- Xero Flor v. Poland (2021) – irregular appointment of judges breached the right to tribunal established by law.

The Convention applies to contracting parties only; however, in cases where a contracting party court has to confirm the ruling of a non-contracting state, they retain a duty to act within the confines of article 6. Such was the case in Pellegrini v Italy (2001), a case concerning the application of a Vatican ecclesiastical court ruling on a divorce case.

In the determination of criminal charges, Engel v Netherlands set out three criteria to determine meaning of "criminal": a) the classification of the offence in the law of the respondent state, b) the nature of the offence, c) the possible punishment. Funke v France states that if the contracting state classifies the act as criminal, then it is automatically so for the purposes of article 6.

- John Murray v United Kingdom (1996) 22 EHRR 29
- Benthem v Netherlands (ECtHR 23 October 1985)
- Assanidze v. Georgia, App. No. 71503/01 (ECtHR 8 April 2004)

== See also ==
- European Convention on Human Rights
- Human Rights Act 1998
- Natural justice
- Speedy trial
- Expedite removal

== Literature ==
- D. Vitkauskas, G. Dikov Protecting the Right to a Fair Trial under the European Convention on Human Rights. A Handbook for Legal Practitioners. 2nd Edition, prepared by Dovydas Vitkauskas Strasbourg, Council of Europe, 2017
- D. Vitkauskas, G. Dikov Protecting the Right to a Fair Trial under the European Convention on Human Rights. Council of Europe Human Rights Handbooks Strasbourg, Council of Europe, 2012
- N. Mole, C. Harby The right to a fair trial. A guide to the implementation of Article 6 of the European Convention on Human Rights Strasbourg, Council of Europe, 2006
- R. Goss Criminal Fair Trial Rights: Article 6 of the European Convention on Human Rights Portland/Oxford: Hart, 2014
