= Protocol No. 6 to the European Convention on Human Rights =

Protocol No. 6 to the European Convention on Human Rights is a text drawn up by the Council of Europe. It aims to restrict the application of the death penalty by abolishing it in peacetime. It is the only optional protocol to the Convention that is signed and ratified by all members of the Council of Europe.

It was subsequently supplemented by Protocol No. 13, which abolishes the death penalty in all circumstances, including in times of war or threat of war.

The case law of the European Court of Human Rights now effectively abolishes the death penalty for all States Parties to the Convention, even if they have not ratified Protocol No. 6 or No 13.

== Purpose ==
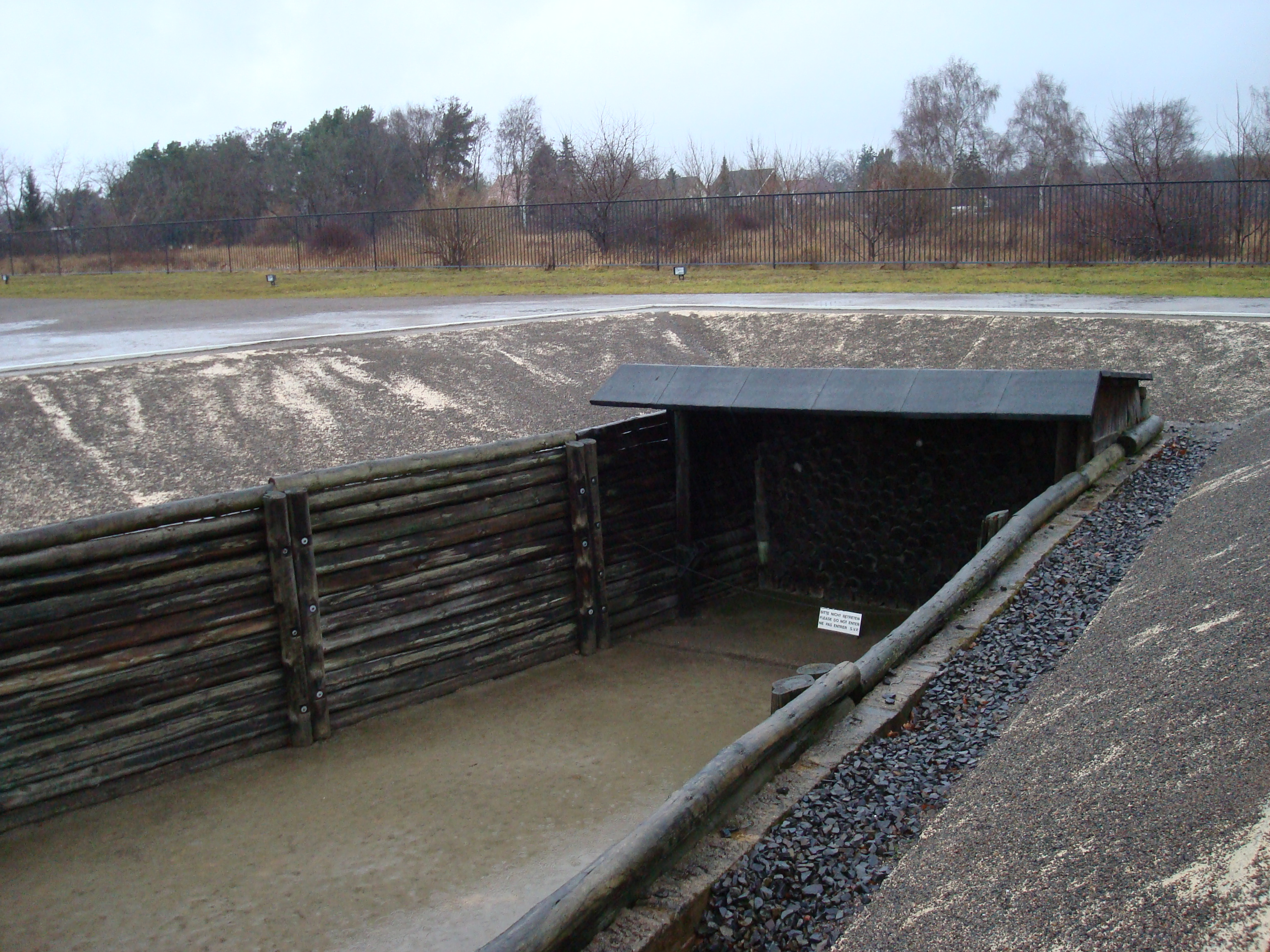
Execution hall. The Protocol does not prohibit executions in the event of war.

Protocol No. 6 is one of the so-called substantive additional protocols, the purpose of which is to add more rights to the list of those initially proclaimed by the Convention. For this reason, States that have ratified the Convention are free to sign it or not. For the same reason, it is not necessary for all States parties to the Convention to ratify the protocol for it to enter into force. This provides flexibility to States, although at the cost of generating differences between them.

== Partial abolition of the death penalty ==
Protocol No. 6 adds a single right to the list of human rights contained in the Convention, although it is set out in several main articles.

== Protection ==
The new right enjoys the same protection as the Convention grants to the rights originally included in it. Individuals, non-governmental organizations and groups of individuals may bring proceedings before the European Court of Human Rights alleging violations of their rights.

Spain signed Protocol No. 6 on 28 April 1983 and ratified it on 14 January 1985. Following its ratification by Monaco in 2004, 46 of the 47 member states of the Council of Europe had ratified the Protocol. Russia, the only remaining State that had not ratified the Protocol, was expelled from the Council of Europe in March 2022, following the war in Ukraine. Consequently, all member States of the Council of Europe have now ratified the Protocol.

== Case of Al-Saadoon and Mufdhi ==
In its 2010 judgment in the case of Al-Saadoon and Mufdhi v. United Kingdom, the Court concluded that Article 2 of the Convention prohibits the death penalty, due to the general trend towards its abolition among the States Parties to the Convention. Thus, the ratification of Protocol No. 6 and No. 13 is now essentially symbolic: it reflects the voluntary commitment of the State Party to the abolitionist trend in Europe, without it being a requirement to which it is compelled to conform.

== See also ==
- Summary of ratifications of the substantive additional protocols
