= Othman (Abu Qatada) v United Kingdom =

Othman (Abu Qatada) v. United Kingdom was a 2012 judgment of the European Court of Human Rights which stated that under Article 6 of the European Convention on Human Rights the United Kingdom could not lawfully deport Abu Qatada to Jordan, because of the risk of the use of evidence obtained by torture.

== Summary and final disposition ==
The ECtHR judgment found the 2009 House of Lords judgment RB (Algeria) v Secretary of State for the Home Department to be a breach of Abu Qatada's rights under the Convention. This case involved deportation; inhuman or degrading treatment or punishment; Jordan; memorandums of understanding; retrials; right to fair trial; right to liberty and security; and torture.

Othman, aka Qatada, was born in Jordan and came to the United Kingdom in September 1993. He made an application for asylum and was recognised as a refugee on 30 June 1994 and granted leave to remain to 30 June 1998. On 8 May 1998 he applied for indefinite leave to remain. In April 1999, he was convicted in absentia in Jordan of conspiracy to cause explosions, in a trial known as the "reform and challenge" case, and in the autumn of 2000 he was again tried in absentia in a case known as the "millennium conspiracy". In both cases, Qatada maintains that the only evidence against him comes from testimonies from co-defendants who had been tortured while in custody.

On 23 October 2002 he was arrested and detained under the Anti-terrorism, Crime and Security Act 2001. This Act was repealed in March 2005 and the applicant was released on bail and subjected to a control order. On 11 August 2005, while his appeal against that control order was pending, the Secretary of State served the applicant with a notice of intention to deport.

Qatada was eventually set to be deported from the UK to face retrial in Jordan after a memorandum of understanding (MOU) between the two countries that evidence obtained by torture would be discarded.

The ECtHR found that the deportation of Qatada would not be in violation of Article 3 on prohibition of torture (by itself or in conjunction with Article 13) nor of Article 5 on the right to liberty and security. However, it found that deportation to Jordan would be in violation of Article 6 (right to a fair trial) since there was a real risk that Othman would be retried on "evidence obtained by torture of third persons".

== Aftermath ==
Abu Qatada was released on bail on highly prescriptive terms on 13 February 2012. He was prohibited from using a mobile phone, computer or the internet, and subject to an electronically monitored 22-hour curfew that only allowed him to leave home twice a day for a maximum of one hour.

During the next fifteen months Qatada was rearrested and bailed again, as the UK government worked their way through the justice system. In May 2013, he pledged he would leave the UK if the UK and Jordanian governments agreed and ratified a treaty clarifying that evidence gained through torture would not be used against him in his forthcoming trial. On 7 July 2013, following the ratification of such a treaty, Abu Qatada was deported from the United Kingdom.

== See also ==
- Chahal v. United Kingdom (1996), which had applied Article 3 in a similar way.
