= Vavřička and Others v. the Czech Republic =

2021 case law

Vavřička and Others v. the Czech Republic, applications 47621/13, 3867/14, 73094/14, 19306/15, 19298/15, and 43883/15 (ECtHR April 8, 2021), is a 2021 case decided by the European Court of Human Rights (ECtHR), holding that the nation of the Czech Republic did not violate the European Convention on Human Rights by imposing a vaccination mandate on children in that country.

The legal challenge was initially filed by Czech citizen Pavel Vavřička, who had received a fine for refusing to vaccinate his children for tetanus, hepatitis B, and polio. The court found that the public health interest in achieving herd immunity from contagious diseases outweighed the individual right to privacy, and that the Czech law contained sufficient provisions for the exemption of those with medical or religious reasons for not receiving vaccination, neither of which were demonstrated by the objecting parent.

The case was the first in which the ECtHR had ruled on the question of compulsory vaccination.

== See also ==
- Vaccine hesitancy
