= TV Vest and Rogaland Pensioners Party v. Norway =

TV Vest and Rogaland Pensioners Party v. Norway is a case argued before the European Court of Human Rights during late 2008. The Court found that the specific prohibition (blanket ban) of political TV advertising in Norway constituted a breach against Article 10 of the European Convention on Human Rights.

== Context ==
During the spring of 2003, Rogaland Pensioners Party bought the rights to air three different political advertisements for their political party, as regional elections in Norway were due 15 September 2003, on the local TV channel TV Vest. Upon notifying the Norwegian Media Authority about the commercials, the Media Authority warned the broadcaster that broadcasting political advertising is illegal in Norway and considered fining TV Vest if the commercials were aired. The commercials were nevertheless broadcast during 11 days from 14 August to 13 September, which prompted the Media Authority to fine TV Vest 35,000 Norwegian kroner for violating the political advertising ban.

TV Vest then appealed to the Oslo City Court, who found the airing constituted a violation of the ban. TV Vest then appealed to the Supreme Court, who granted leave to appeal. TV Vest argued that the ban violated Article 10, but the Supreme Court found by 4 to 1 that no such violation had occurred.

== Judgment ==
The Court found that the ban on political advertising itself did not constitute a violation of Article 10, since its purpose was to avoid large parties with large funding from achieving more airtime than other parties who lacked funds.

However, Rogaland Pensioners Party is a small party (receiving only 2.5% of the regional votes in the 2003 election) with minor media coverage, and who did not receive any other relevant airtime during the election coverage than the broadcast advertisements in question. Since the Court found the content of the advertisement to be neither offensive nor capable of lowering the political debate, the interference was found to be unnecessary in a democratic society, therefore being a violation of Article 10.
