= Kokkinakis v. Greece =

1993 European Court of Human Rights case

Kokkinakis v. Greece (application No. 14307/88) is a landmark case of the European Court of Human Rights, decided in 1993 and concerning compatibility of certain sanctions for proselytism with Articles 7 and 9 of the European Convention on Human Rights. It ruled by a vote of six-to-three that a Jehovah's Witness man's freedom to manifest his religion, protected by Article 9, had been violated by the Greek government. One of the judges wrote that this case was "of particular importance" because it was "the first real case concerning freedom of religion to have come before the European Court since it was set up" in 1959.

== Facts ==
The crime of proselytism, according to Greek law, meant "in particular, any direct or indirect attempt to intrude on the religious beliefs of a person of a different religious persuasion (eterodoxos), with the aim of undermining those beliefs, either by any kind of inducement or promise of an inducement or moral support or material assistance, or by fraudulent means or by taking advantage of his inexperience, trust, need, low intellect or naïvety". Greek court has later clarified that "purely spiritual teaching does not amount to proselytism, even if it demonstrates the errors of other religions and entices possible disciples away from them, who abandon their original religions of their own free will; this is because spiritual teaching is in the nature of a rite of worship performed freely and without hindrance. Outside such spiritual teaching, which may be freely given, any determined, importunate attempt to entice disciples away from the dominant religion by means that are unlawful or morally reprehensible constitutes proselytism as prohibited".

Mr. Minos Kokkinakis, a Jehovah's Witness, and his wife, called at the home of Mrs Kyriakaki in Sitia and engaged in a discussion with her, described by Ms. Kyriakaki as follows: "They immediately talked to me about Olof Palme, whether he was a pacifist or not, and other subjects that I can't remember. They talked to me about things I did not understand very well. It was not a discussion but a constant monologue by them. ... If they had told me they were Jehovah's Witnesses, I would not have let them in. I don't recall whether they spoke to me about the Kingdom of Heaven. They stayed in the house about ten minutes or a quarter of an hour. What they told me was religious in nature, but I don't know why they told it to me. I could not know at the outset what the purpose of their visit was. They may have said something to me at the time with a view to undermining my religious beliefs... [However,] the discussion did not influence my beliefs". Mrs Kyriakaki's husband, who was the cantor at a local Orthodox church, informed the police and Mr. Kokkinakis was convicted for proselytism.

Mr. Kokkinakis appealed to the ECtHR under Articles 7, 9, 10 and 14 of the European Convention on Human Rights. The court's Commission unanimously held that there had been a violation of Kokkinakis' rights under Article 9.

== Court's judgment ==
The court held that the measure complained of was prescribed by law and was in pursuit of a legitimate aim under Article 9 of the European Convention on Human Rights, namely the protection of the rights and freedoms of others. However, it found a violation of Article 9 (by six votes to three), reasoning that the interference with Kokkinakis' freedom of religion was not necessary in a democratic society since: a "distinction has to be made between bearing Christian witness and improper proselytism. The former corresponds to true evangelism, which a report drawn up in 1956 under the auspices of the World Council of Churches describes as an essential mission and a responsibility of every Christian and every Church. The latter represents a corruption or deformation of it. It may, according to the same report, take the form of activities offering material or social advantages with a view to gaining new members for a Church or exerting improper pressure on people in distress or in need; it may even entail the use of violence or brainwashing; more generally, it is not compatible with respect for the freedom of thought, conscience and religion of others. Scrutiny of section 4 of Law no. 1363/1938 shows that the relevant criteria adopted by the Greek legislature are reconcilable with the foregoing if and in so far as they are designed only to punish improper proselytism, which the Court does not have to define in the abstract in the present case. The Court notes, however, that in their reasoning the Greek courts established the applicant’s liability by merely reproducing the wording of section 4 and did not sufficiently specify in what way the accused had attempted to convince his neighbour by improper means. None of the facts they set out warrants that finding. That being so, it has not been shown that the applicant’s conviction was justified in the circumstances of the case by a pressing social need. The contested measure therefore does not appear to have been proportionate to the legitimate aim pursued".

The Court rejected (by eight votes to one) applicant's claim that the provision of Greek law serving as ground for his conviction was not sufficiently precise and clear, violating Article 7.

The Court held unnecessary to examine the case under Article 10 or 14.

Judge Pettiti submitted a partly concurring opinion, considering that the criminal legislation in Greece on proselytism was in itself contrary to Article 9. Judge De Meyer submitted a short concurring opinion.

Judges Foighel and Loizou, jointly, and Judge Valticos filed two dissenting opinions, regarding Article 9 as not violated.

Judge Martens filed a partly dissenting opinion, offering his own rationale for the finding of violation of Article 9 and also considering Article 7 to be violated.
