= McCann and Others v United Kingdom =

Legal case

- Court: European Court of Human Rights

McCann and Others v United Kingdom 21 ECHR 97 GC is a legal case tried in 1995 before the European Court of Human Rights (ECtHR) regarding a purported breach of Article 2 of the European Convention on Human Rights (ECHR) by the United Kingdom.

== Facts ==
Intelligence suggested a team of known Provisional Irish Republican Army (IRA) members (Daniel McCann, Seán Savage and Mairéad Farrell) were planning a bombing in Gibraltar. One of the members was a known explosives expert while the others had been linked as well as convicted for various explosive and terrorist related activities. During surveillance, the team crossed the border from Spain with no resistance from the authorities and subsequently parked a car in a crowded place. In past instances, the IRA had employed remote control detonators and intelligence suggested the car was rigged with explosives with the suspects holding the remote detonator.

A team of SAS soldiers was sent to intercept and arrest them on conspiracy charges, in an operation code-named Operation Flavius. The team, in accordance with their training, shot and killed the suspects which at the time the teams claimed to be a justifiable response to the suspects allegedly reaching for what the team believed were the detonators. The inquest into the shootings found no breach of Article 2 or the Gibraltar constitution. At the time of the shootings the suspects had neither a detonator nor any explosives. A car was however found registered under one of the suspects names which had been laced with explosive devices of 'ticking time bomb' type and not remote detonators. It appeared that the suspects were on a reconnaissance-mission and had parked their car to save a space for the actual car containing the explosives.

== Judgment ==
McCann and Others v United Kingdom was the first case before the European Court of Human Rights (ECtHR) to concern Article 2 of the European Convention on Human Rights (ECHR), which protects the right to life. The ECtHR considered whether the shooting was disproportionate to the aims to be achieved by the state in apprehending the suspects and defending the citizens of Gibraltar from unlawful violence; the court found a violation of Article 2: the killing of the three IRA members did not constitute a use of force which was "absolutely necessary" as proscribed by Article 2-2.

The violation of Article 2 was found by a vote of 10 to 9 in the planning by the Authorities in that it was not "strictly proportionate" to the objectives to be achieved; i.e. saving lives. First, the court found a breach in the failure to arrest the suspects at the border so as to safeguard all human lives concerned. Second, the court found that the authorities did not consider the correctness of the intelligence (which turned out to be wrong) and, thirdly, the use of SAS soldiers – combat teams trained to shoot to kill – also amounted to a procedural failure in planning the mission which breached article 2. Nine of nineteen judges dissented: Ryssdal, Bernhardt, Vilhjálmsson, Gölcüklü, Palm, Pekkanen, Freeland, Baka and Jambrek. The court rejected that the UK had specifically planned an execution mission and not an arrest mission and dismissed unanimously the applicants' claims save for compensation for legal expenses.

The Court held:

- By ten votes to nine that there was a violation of Article 2 of the Convention;
- Held unanimously that the United Kingdom is to pay to the applicants, within three months, £38,700 for costs and expenses incurred in the Strasbourg proceedings, less 37,731 French francs to be converted into pounds sterling at the rate of exchange applicable on the date of delivery of the present judgment;
- Dismissed unanimously the applicants' claim for damages;
- Dismissed unanimously the applicants' claim for costs and expenses incurred in the Gibraltar inquest;
- Dismissed unanimously the remainder of the claims for just satisfaction.

== Reactions ==
The judgment was criticised by various British MPs, including deputy prime minister Michael Heseltine who described it as "incomprehensible and dangerous".

== See also ==
- UK constitutional law
- EU law
