= Territorial scope of European Convention on Human Rights =

This table illustrates the extent to which the substantive provisions of the European Convention on Human Rights and its Protocols are ratified (and therefore in force) for territories under the control of the members of the Council of Europe.

Member States and Sovereign Territories	Extent of ECHR	Right of petition to ECtHR	Protocol 1 (Rights to property, education and elections)	Protocol 4 (Civil imprisonment, freedom of movement, expulsion)	Protocol 6 (Prohibition of death penalty in peacetime)	Protocol 7 (Fair trial rights, spousal equality)	Protocol 12 (Right of non-discrimination)	Protocol 13 (Prohibition of death penalty in all circumstances)
Albania	Full	Yes	With Reservations	Yes	Yes	Yes	Yes	Yes
Andorra	With Reservations	Yes	No	No	Yes	No	No	Yes
Armenia	With Reservations	Yes	Yes	Yes	Yes	Yes	Yes	Yes
Austria	With Reservations	Yes	With Reservations	With Reservations	Yes	Yes	No	Yes
Azerbaijan	With Reservations	Yes	Yes	Yes	Yes	Yes	No	No
Belgium	Full	Yes	Yes	Yes	Yes	No	No	Yes
Bosnia and Herzegovina	Full	Yes	Yes	Yes	Yes	Yes	Yes	Yes
Bulgaria	Full	Yes	With Reservations	Yes	Yes	Yes	No	Yes
Croatia	With Reservations	Yes	Yes	Yes	Yes	Yes	Yes	Yes
Cyprus, except:	Full	Yes	Yes	Yes	Yes	Yes	Yes	Yes
Turkish Republic of Northern Cyprus area	Full (through Turkey)	Yes	With Reservations	No	Yes	No	No	Yes
UN Buffer Zone	No	No	Partial	No	No	No	No	No
Czech Republic	With Reservations	Yes	Yes	Yes	Yes	Yes	No	Yes
Denmark	Full	Yes	Yes	Yes	Yes	With Reservations	No	Yes
Faroe Islands	Full	Yes	Yes	Yes	Yes	With Reservations	No	Yes
Greenland	Full	Yes	Yes	Yes	Yes	With Reservations	No	Yes
Estonia	With Reservations	Yes	With Reservations	Yes	Yes	Yes	No	Yes
Finland	With Reservations	Yes	Yes	Yes	Yes	Yes	Yes	Yes
France, except:	With Reservations	Yes	Yes	Yes	Yes	With Reservations	No	Yes
Clipperton Island	With Reservations	Yes	With Reservations	With Reservations	No	With Reservations	No	Yes
Guadeloupe	With Reservations	Yes	With Reservations	With Reservations	No	With Reservations	No	Yes
French Guiana	With Reservations	Yes	With Reservations	With Reservations	No	With Reservations	No	Yes
French Polynesia	With Reservations	Yes	With Reservations	With Reservations	No	With Reservations	No	Yes
French Southern Territories	With Reservations	Yes	With Reservations	With Reservations	No	With Reservations	No	Yes
Martinique	With Reservations	Yes	With Reservations	With Reservations	No	With Reservations	No	Yes
Mayotte	With Reservations	Yes	With Reservations	With Reservations	No	With Reservations	No	Yes
New Caledonia	With Reservations	Yes	With Reservations	With Reservations	No	With Reservations	No	Yes
Réunion	With Reservations	Yes	With Reservations	With Reservations	No	With Reservations	No	Yes
Saint-Pierre and Miquelon	With Reservations	Yes	With Reservations	With Reservations	No	With Reservations	No	Yes
Scattered Islands in the Indian Ocean	With Reservations	Yes	With Reservations	With Reservations	No	With Reservations	No	Yes
Wallis and Futana	With Reservations	Yes	With Reservations	With Reservations	No	With Reservations	No	Yes
Georgia	Full	Yes	With Reservations	Yes	Yes	Yes	Yes	Yes
Germany	With Reservations	Yes	Yes	Yes	Yes	No	No	Yes
Greece	Full	Yes	With Reservations	No	Yes	Yes	No	Yes
Hungary	Full	Yes	Yes	Yes	Yes	Yes	No	Yes
Iceland	Full	Yes	Yes	Yes	Yes	Yes	No	Yes
Ireland	With Reservations	Yes	Yes	Yes	Yes	Yes	No	Yes
Italy	Full	Yes	Yes	Yes	Yes	Yes	No	Yes
Latvia	Full	Yes	With Reservations	With Reservations	Yes	Yes	No	Yes
Liechtenstein	With Reservations	Yes	Yes	Yes	Yes	Yes	No	Yes
Lithuania	With Reservations	Yes	Yes	Yes	Yes	Yes	No	Yes
Luxembourg	Full	Yes	With Reservations	Yes	Yes	With Reservations	No	Yes
Malta	With Reservations	Yes	Yes	Yes	Yes	Yes	No	Yes
Moldova	With Reservations	Yes	Yes	Yes	Yes	Yes	No	Yes
Monaco	With Reservations	Yes	No	With Reservations	Yes	Yes	No	Yes
Netherlands (European part)	Full	Yes	Yes	With Reservations	Yes	No	Yes	Yes
Aruba	Full	Yes	Yes	With Reservations	Yes	No	Yes	Yes
Curaçao	Full	Yes	Yes	With Reservations	Yes	No	Yes	Yes
Sint Maarten	Full	Yes	Yes	With Reservations	Yes	No	Yes	Yes
Caribbean Netherlands	Full	Yes	Yes	With Reservations	Yes	No	Yes	Yes
North Macedonia	Full	Yes	With Reservations	Yes	Yes	Yes	Yes	Yes
Norway, except:	With Reservations	Yes	Yes	Yes	Yes	Yes	No	Yes
Bouvet Island	No	No	No	No	No	No	No	No
Peter I Island	No	No	No	No	No	No	No	No
Poland	Full	Yes	Yes	Yes	Yes	Yes	No	Yes
Portugal	With Reservations	Yes	With Reservations	Yes	Yes	Yes	No	Yes
Romania	With Reservations	Yes	Yes	Yes	Yes	Yes	Yes	Yes
San Marino	With Reservations	Yes	With Reservations	Yes	Yes	Yes	Yes	Yes
Serbia	With Reservations	Yes	Yes	Yes	Yes	Yes	Yes	Yes
Kosovo	No	No	No	No	No	No	No	No
Slovakia	With Reservations	Yes	Yes	Yes	Yes	Yes	No	Yes
Slovenia	Full	Yes	Yes	Yes	Yes	Yes	No	Yes
Spain	With Reservations	Yes	With Reservations	No	Yes	No	No	Yes
Sweden	Full	Yes	With Reservations	Yes	Yes	Yes	No	Yes
Switzerland	Full	Yes	No	No	Yes	With Reservations	No	Yes
Turkey	Full	Yes	With Reservations	No	Yes	No	No	Yes
Ukraine	With Reservations	Yes	Yes	Yes	Yes	Yes	Yes	Yes
United Kingdom, except:	Full	Yes	With Reservations	No	Yes	No	No	Yes
Akrotiri and Dhekelia (Sovereign Base Areas) (Cyprus)	Full	Yes	No	No	Yes	No	No	Yes
Anguilla	Full	Temporary (Until 14 January 2011)	With Reservations	No	Yes	No	No	Yes
Bermuda	Full	Temporary (Until 14 January 2011)	No	No	Yes	No	No	Yes
British Antarctic Territory	No	No	No	No	No	No	No	No
British Indian Ocean Territory	No	No	No	No	No	No	No	No
British Virgin Islands	Full	No	No	No	No	No	No	No
Cayman Islands	Full	Yes	With Reservations	No	No	No	No	No
Falkland Islands	Full	Yes	No	No	Yes	No	No	Yes
Gibraltar	Full	Yes	With Reservations	No	Yes	No	No	Yes
Guernsey	Full	With Reservations	No	No	Yes	No	No	Yes
Jersey	Full	Yes	Yes	No	Yes	No	No	Yes
Isle of Man	Full	Yes	With Reservations	No	Yes	No	No	Yes
Montserrat	Full	Temporary (Until 14 January 2011)	With Reservations	No	Yes	No	No	Yes
Pitcairn Island	No	No	No	No	No	No	No	No
Saint Helena, Ascension and Tristan da Cunha, Ascension Island and Tristan da Cunha	Full	Temporary (Until 14 January 2011)	With Reservations	No	Yes	No	No	Yes
South Georgia and the South Sandwich Islands	Full	Yes	No	No	Yes	No	No	Yes
Turks and Caicos Islands	Full	Temporary (Until 14 January 2011)	With Reservations	No	Yes	No	No	Yes
