= Strasbourg Observers =

Belgian legal blog

Strasbourg Observers is an academic blog published in English, which focuses on recent developments relating to the European Court of Human Rights (ECtHR). The blog was established by Eva Brems together with her Ph.D. researchers from Ghent University, Belgium, in April 2010. Since 2021, the blog has been maintained by researchers based at the Human Rights Centre of Ghent University and at the Centre for Government and Law of Hasselt University. Posts published in the blog have been cited several times in the separate opinions of the Court.

== Reception ==
Human rights scholar Kanstantsin Dzehtsiarou commented that while Strasbourg Observers is "one of the leading blogs dedicated to the ECtHR", many of the posts have "missed opportunity" in the title, which indicates how various stakeholders "are not satisfied with the level of the Court’s engagement with various socio-legal issues." He then criticised the frequent use of this phrase in the blog. In his words, "The ECtHR needs to balance these different approaches and offer, not ideal, but appropriate solutions. So, what in one person’s eyes can be a ‘missed opportunity’, someone else might not see as an opportunity at all. Those academics who speak of ‘missed opportunities’ would wish the ECtHR to do ‘more’ to protect human rights and do it ‘better’ – whatever these terms may mean to each one of us. The Court is looking for ways to enhance its ability strategically to impact human rights standards in Europe."
