= Assanidze v. Georgia =

European Court of Human Rights case

Submitted 2 July 2001 Decided 4 August 2004
- Full case name: Assanidze v. Georgia
- Case: 71503/01
- ECLI: ECLI:CE:ECHR:2004:0408JUD007150301
- Case type: Human Rights
- Chamber: Grand Chamber
- Nationality of parties: Georgian

Ruling
- Assanidze's rights to liberty and to a fair hearing were breached. Immediate release and 150,000 euros compensation ordered.

Court composition
- President; Luzius Wildhaber
- Judges: Christos Rozakis; Jean-Paul Costa; Georg Ress; Nicolas Bratza; Lucius Caflisch; Loukis Loucaides; Ireneu Cabral Barreto; Viera Strážnická; Karel Jungwiert; Boštjan Zupančič; Wilhelmina Thomassen; Snejana Botoucharova; Mindia Ugrekhelidze; Vladimiro Zagrebelsky; Antonella Mularoni

Instruments cited
- European Convention on Human Rights

Keywords
- International human rights law; Liberty; Habeas corpus; Right to a fair trial; Freedom of movement; False imprisonment; Freedom of expression; Adjara

Assanidze v. Georgia is a decision of the European Court of Human Rights concerning the illegal incarceration of a Georgia national by the Ajarian authorities in violation of the European Convention on Human Rights. In 2004 the Court found in favour of Assanidze, recognising breaches to his right to liberty and right to a fair hearing under European Convention on Human Rights. As a result, the Court ordered that Assanidze be released "at the earliest possible date" and awarded €150,000 in damages. It was the first case against Georgia ruled upon by the European Court of Human Rights.

== Background ==
The applicant, Tenguiz Assanidze was the former Mayor of Batumi and member of the Ajarian Parliament, an Autonomous Republic of Georgia. Assanidze was arrested on 4 October 1993 under "suspicion of illegal financial dealings in the Batumi Tobacco Manufacturing Company and the unlawful possession and handling of firearms". He was subsequently sentenced to 8 years imprisonment. In 1999 Assanidze was pardoned by President of Georgia Eduard Shevardnadze in Decree no. 1200 but was not released and remained imprisoned by the Ajarian authorities. The Batumi Tobacco Manufacturing Company disputed the pardon and it was put on hold. In 1999 the Ajarian High court quashed the pardon. However, that decision was quickly quashed by the Supreme Court of Georgia on 28 December 1999. The legislation in place at the time put the case in the hands of the Administrative and Tax Affairs Panel of the Tbilisi Court of Appeal.

On the same day he was acquitted by presidential pardon, Assanidze was charged with criminal association and kidnapping. He was kept incarcerated pending investigation into the charges. After an "exhaustive" fact finding effort by the prosecution it was decided that there was insufficient evidence to convict Assanidze. Again, this dismissal was challenged and the case reopened on 28 April 2000. The case went to trial where the prosecution arranged for the defendant's brother, David Assanidze, to give evidence that the defendant had supplied funds and two machine guns that were instrumental in the kidnapping attempt. Further, it was alleged that the defendant had orchestrated the 1996 crime which ended in the murder of the head of the regional department of the Ministry of the Interior for Khelvachauri. The Ajarian High Court gave its judgment based solely on the evidence given by the three members of the group involved in the kidnapping who had been found guilty when the case was first tried in 1996 and convicted the defendant. He was sentenced to twelve years’ imprisonment. As the applicant had not left prison since his arrest on 4 October the court backdated the sentence to the defendant's first day of incarceration.

Following the sentencing, the applicant appealed the decision on points of law. On 29 January 2001 the Supreme Court of Georgia heard the appeal in the applicant's absence and acquitted the applicant on 2 October 2000. The Court said, inter alia:

The preliminary investigation and judicial investigation in the present case were conducted in flagrant breach of the statutory rules. The criminal file does not contain incontrovertible evidence capable of supporting a guilty verdict; the judgment is, moreover, self-contradictory and based on inconsistent conjecture and depositions from persons interested in the outcome of the proceedings that were obtained in breach of the procedural rules.

In a final attempt to set aside the case the Supreme Court ruled that "Mr Tengiz Assanidze shall be immediately released" and stated that "This judgment is final and no appeal shall lie against it." However, the administration of the Ajarian Autonomous Republic refused to release the applicant even after appeals from the President, vice-president and the Public Defender. Despite multiple letters to the Ajarian authorities commenting on the breach of the Convention for the Protection of Human Rights and Fundamental Freedoms and the "reckless disregard for the rule of law", no further progress was made to secure the applicant's release. The underlying issue here was the refusal by the Ajarian authorities to recognise the Georgian government as its sovereign, instead standing resolutely that they had judicial autonomy to act as the administration saw fit.

In 2001 an application was made to the European Court of Human Rights alleging a violation of Assanidze's rights guaranteed by Article 5 § 1, 3 and 4, Article 6 § 1, Article 10 § 1 and Article 13 of the Convention, and Article 2 of Protocol No. 4.

On 30 July 2002, the Investigation Committee of the Georgian Parliament began to write a report on the legality of the presidential pardon and the proceedings against the applicant. The Committee found that the President had "absolute and unconditional" power to grant a pardon. Further, it recommended that the applicant's case be ultimately decided by the Court in Strasbourg (European Court on Human Rights).

== Court's judgment ==
=== Article 1 (respecting rights) ===
The first issue the Court faced was whether the Autonomous Republic of Adjaria was within the jurisdiction of Georgia for the purposes of the European Convention on Human Rights. Adjara (Batumi) has been included in international agreements dating back to 1829 and is currently contained within Georgia's borders. On 24 August 1995 Georgia adopted a new constitution following the dissolution of the USSR. The Court interpreted the wording of Article 2 § 3 of the Constitution and found that Georgia held "jurisdiction" over the Autonomous Republic of Adjara for the purposes of the European Convention on Human Rights. Further, Georgia had ratified the European Convention on Human Rights without making specific mention of the Ajarian Autonomous Republic or any challenges that would prohibit the State upholding the treaty across its territories. Lastly, the Court observed that the Ajarian Autonomous Republic had no "separatist aspirations" that may impact on Georgia's sovereign control over the region.

=== Article 5 (liberty and security) ===
==== Section 1 ====
Citing Article 35, § 4, of the European Convention on Human Rights, the Court deemed it necessary to declare that evidence regarding Assanidze's detention up until 11 December 1999 to be inadmissible. The Article requires applications be made "within a period of six months from the date on which the final [domestic] decision was taken". Noting that the applicant had exhausted all "domestic remedies" to no avail, it was decided that the court would consider only the detention from 29 January 2001, the date that the Supreme Court of Georgia ordered the release of the applicant. Despite his release being ordered by the Supreme Court of Georgia, the applicant remained incarcerated in an Ajarian Ministry of Security prison even though no further charges or order had been laid before the local Court to warrant his detainment. The Grand Chamber ruled unanimously that the applicant had been deprived of his right to liberty and security afforded to him by Article 5 § 1 and was being detained without legal authority or certainty of release. The Court could find no exception in common or treaty law that would justify the applicant's deprivation of liberty despite examining a number of cases and Article 5 § 1 in depth. It was held that a breach of national law in the light of Article 5 was to be considered a breach of the convention. The judgment text goes on to say that "it is inconceivable that in a State subject to the rule of law a person should continue to be deprived of his liberty despite the existence of a court order for his release".

In finding a breach regarding the arbitrary imprisonment the court found it unnecessary to examine the applicant's complaint regarding the place of detention as it added nothing to the violation. Further, the issue of isolation was not examined by the court as it fell outside the scope of the case.

==== Section 3 ====
The complaint regarding the time of proceeding fell outside of the six-month time limit set out in Article 35 § 1 of the convention. It was stated that the opportunity for an application regarding section 3 ended on 2 October 2000. As a result, the Court had no choice but to dismiss the complaint.

==== Section 4 and article 13 (effective remedy) ====
The Applicant raised the issue that failure to follow the order for his release amounted to a breach of his rights under Article 5 § 4 and Article 13. This operational complaint was brushed over by the court (fourteen votes to three) as it was seen to raise the same issue with the same material facts as the complaint concerning Article 6 § 1. As a result, the Court did not investigate this complaint.

=== Article 6 (fair trial) ===
The judgment made on 29 January 2001 ordering the applicant's release was not followed and therefore "deprived the provisions of Article 6 § 1 of the Convention of all useful effect". Further, the Court said that Article 6 would be 'illusory" should a final judicial decision to acquit not be followed causing measurable harm to the defendant. For this reason the Court held by fourteen votes to three that there had been a failure to comply with a legally enforceable and final decision and therefore amounted to a breach of the convention.

=== Article 10 (freedom of expression) ===
The Court found no reason to sustain a submission that there had been a breach of the applicant's freedom of expression. Neither party added any further argument to prove or disprove a breach beyond the initial application.

=== Article 2 of Protocol no. 4 (right to move freely) ===
The applicant's argument for finding a breach of his right to "liberty of movement" protected under Article 2 of Protocol No. 4 was deemed not to be relevant by the Court. The restriction of this right was due to the applicant's incarceration and not any other restriction. The Court was therefore of the opinion that an examination of Article 5 would sufficiently satisfy any claim of this nature and deemed it unnecessary to investigate the alleged violation Article 2 of Protocol No. 4 any further.

=== Article 41 (just satisfaction) ===
Using the powers afforded by Article 41 the Court, noting the extreme circumstances of the applicant's detainment, ordered that Assanidze be released at "the earliest possible" date. In addition, they ordered the State to pay €150,000 plus value-added tax in damages. The applicant originally demanded €3 million but the Government argued successfully that this figure was "grossly exaggerated" to restore the applicant to his situation prior to the breach (restitutio ad integrum). In addition to the sum awarded for damages the Court followed, among other things, the previous decision in Maestri v. Italy that held should a violation be found, the Government must consider adopting domestic legislation to prevent any future breaches of similar nature from occurring. Despite that, the Court went on to say that given the facts of the case there are no obvious solutions that would have prevented this violation from occurring as the underlying issue of judicial authority had not been tested by the Autonomous Republic of Adjara nor was there any prior indication of transgressive behaviour by Adjara until this case.

== Aftermath ==
After the ruling, the newly-sworn President of Georgia Mikheil Saakashvili ordered the Adjarian authorities to immediately release Assanidze and threatened with "appropriate measures" in case of failure to comply. The leader of Adjara, Aslan Abashidze, criticized ECHR's ruling as "biased". Assanidze was released from prison on 9 April 2004 and received his compensation in full from Georgia's government in September 2004.

== See also ==
- History of Adjara
- 2004 Adjara crisis
