= European Convention on Human Rights =

International treaty in Europe

The Convention for the Protection of Human Rights and Fundamental Freedoms
- Parties (dark green) and former parties (light green) to the convention
- Signed: 4 November 1950
- Location: Rome
- Effective: 3 September 1953
- Parties: 46 Council of Europe member states
- Depositary: Council of Europe Secretary General
- Languages: English and French

Full text
- European Convention for the Protection of Human Rights and Fundamental Freedoms at Wikisource

The Convention for the Protection of Human Rights and Fundamental Freedoms (commonly known as the European Convention on Human Rights or ECHR) is a supranational international treaty designed to protect human rights and political freedoms throughout Europe. It was opened for signature on 4 November 1950 by the member states of the newly formed Council of Europe and entered into force on 3 September 1953. All Council of Europe member states are parties to the Convention, and any new member is required to ratify it at the earliest opportunity.

The ECHR was directly inspired by the Universal Declaration of Human Rights, proclaimed by the United Nations General Assembly on 10 December 1948. Its main difference lies in the existence of an international court, the European Court of Human Rights (ECtHR), whose judgments are legally binding on states parties. This ensures that the rights set out in the Convention are not just principles but are concretely enforceable through individual complaint or inter-state complaint procedures.

To guarantee this judicial enforcement, the Convention established both the Committee of Ministers of the Council of Europe and the ECtHR, which has sat in Strasbourg since its creation in 1959. Any person who believes their rights under the Convention have been violated by a state party can bring a case before the Court, provided their state allows it under Article 56 of the Convention. Judgments finding violations are binding on the states concerned, which are obliged to comply, particularly by paying appropriate compensation to applicants for any damage suffered. The Committee of Ministers supervises the execution of judgments.

The ECHR has defined the Convention as a living instrument, meaning it must be interpreted in light of present-day conditions. This evolving case law can restrict the margin of appreciation left to states or create new rights derived from existing provisions.

Since its adoption, the Convention has been amended by seventeen additional protocols, which have added new rights or extended existing ones. These include the right to property, the right to education, the right to free elections, the prohibition of imprisonment for debt, the right to freedom of movement, the ban on expelling nationals, the prohibition of collective expulsion of aliens, the abolition of the death penalty, procedural safeguards for the expulsion of lawfully residing foreigners, the right to a double degree of jurisdiction in criminal matters, the right to compensation for wrongful conviction, the ne bis in idem principle (not to be tried or punished twice for the same offence), equality between spouses, and a general prohibition of discrimination.

The most recent version entered into force on 1 August 2021 through Protocol No. 15, which added the principle of subsidiarity to the preamble. This principle reaffirms that states parties have the primary responsibility to secure and remedy human rights violations at national level.

The European Convention on Human Rights is widely considered the most effective international treaty for the protection of human rights and has had a significant influence on the domestic law of all Council of Europe member states.

== Context ==
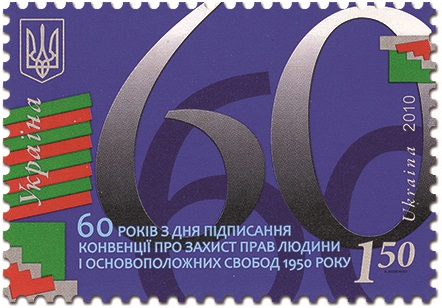
Ukrainian stamp, commemorating 60 years of the European Convention on Human Rights

The European Convention on Human Rights has played an important role in the development and awareness of human rights in Europe. The development of a regional system of human rights protections operating across Europe can be seen as a direct response to twin concerns. First, in the aftermath of the Second World War, the convention, drawing on the inspiration of the Universal Declaration of Human Rights, can be seen as part of a wider response from the Allied powers in delivering a human rights agenda to prevent the most serious human rights violations which had occurred during the Second World War from happening again.

Second, the convention was a response to the growth of Stalinism in Central and Eastern Europe and was designed to protect the member states of the Council of Europe from communist subversion. This, in part, explains the constant references to values and principles that are "necessary in a democratic society" throughout the convention, despite the fact that such principles are not in any way defined within the convention itself. Consequently, the convention was principally conceived, at the time of its creation, as an "anti-totalitarian" measure to help stabilise social democracies in Western Europe, rather than as a specific reaction to the legacy of Nazism and the Holocaust. This approach was a continuation of Atlanticist beliefs from World War II and the early Cold War which called for the defence of democracy against all forms of authoritarianism.

== History ==
From 7 to 10 May 1948, politicians including Winston Churchill, François Mitterrand, and Konrad Adenauer, as well as civil society representatives, academics, business leaders, trade unionists, and religious leaders convened the Congress of Europe in The Hague. At the end of the Congress, a declaration and following pledge to create the convention was issued. The second and third articles of the pledge state: "We desire a Charter of Human Rights guaranteeing liberty of thought, assembly and expression as well as right to form a political opposition. We desire a Court of Justice with adequate sanctions for the implementation of this Charter."

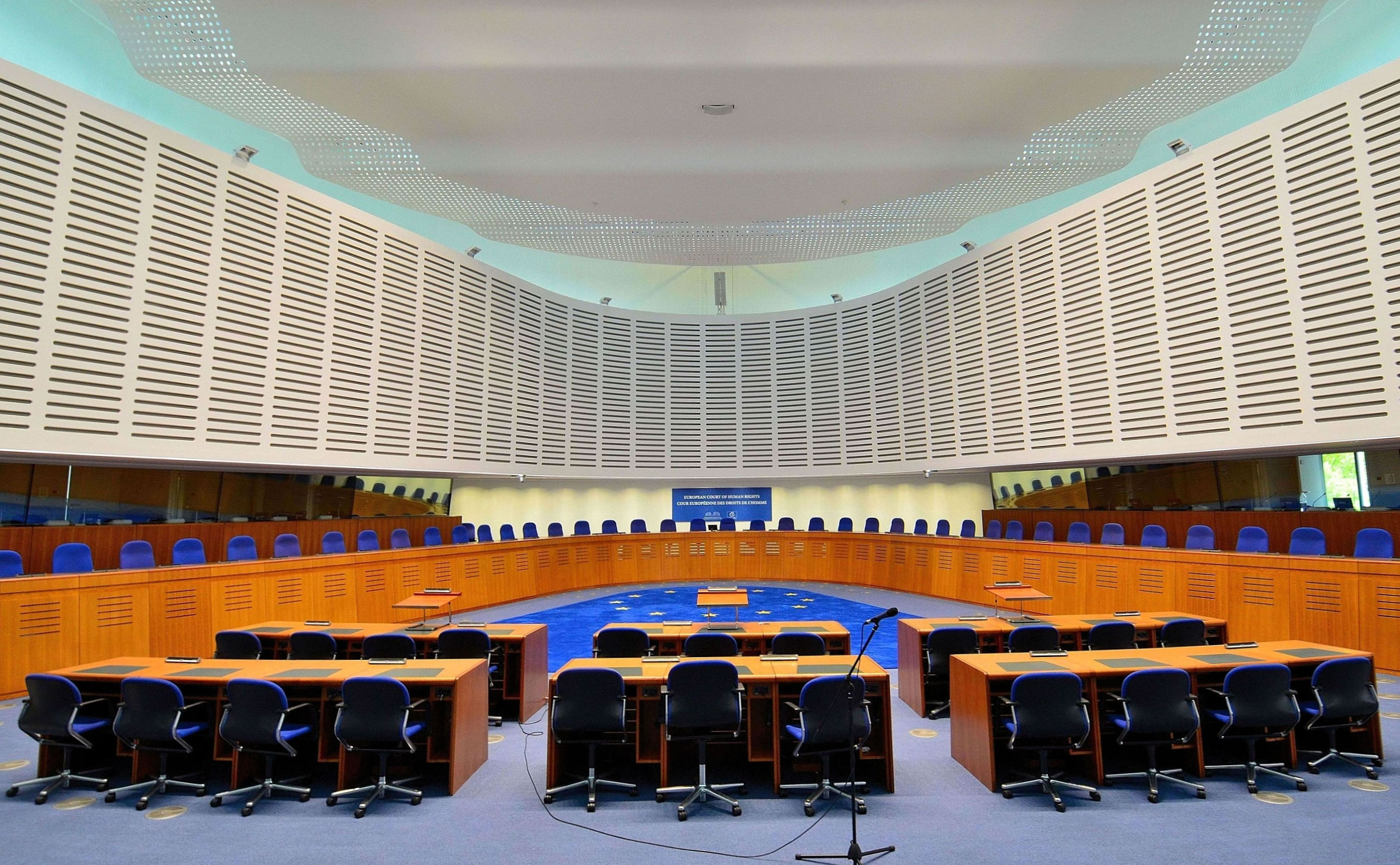
Courtroom of the Strasbourg Court

The convention was drafted as one the first and most important tasks of the newly-formed Council of Europe. Over 100 parliamentarians from the then-twelve member states of the Council gathered in Strasbourg in the summer of 1949 for the first-ever meeting of the Council's Consultative Assembly to draft the "charter of human rights" announced at the Hague, and to establish a court to enforce it. British MP and lawyer Sir David Maxwell-Fyfe, the chair of the Assembly's Committee on Legal and Administrative Questions, was one of its leading members and guided the drafting of the convention, based on an earlier draft produced by the European Movement. As a prosecutor at the Nuremberg Trials, he had seen first-hand the power of international justice.

French former minister and French Resistance fighter Pierre-Henri Teitgen submitted a report to the Assembly proposing a list of rights to be protected, selecting a number from the Universal Declaration of Human Rights that had recently been agreed to in New York, and defining how the enforcing judicial mechanism might operate. After extensive debates, the Assembly sent its final proposal to the Council of Europe's Committee of Ministers, which convened a group of experts to draft the convention itself.

The convention was designed to incorporate a traditional civil liberties approach to securing "effective political democracy", from the strongest traditions in the United Kingdom, France and other member states of the fledgling Council of Europe, as said by Guido Raimondi, President of the European Court of Human Rights:

The European system of protection of human rights with its Court would be inconceivable untied from democracy. In fact, we have a bond that is not only regional or geographic: a State cannot be party to the European Convention on Human Rights if it is not a member of the Council of Europe; it cannot be a member State of the Council of Europe if it does not respect pluralist democracy, the rule of law and human rights. So a non-democratic State could not participate in the ECHR system: the protection of democracy goes hand in hand with the protection of rights.

— Guido Raimondi

The convention was opened for signature on 4 November 1950 in Rome. It was ratified and entered into force on 3 September 1953. It is overseen and enforced by the European Court of Human Rights in Strasbourg, and the Council of Europe. Until procedural reforms in the late 1990s, the convention was also overseen by a European Commission on Human Rights.

Proposals for reform of the convention have been put forward, for example by former UK Prime Minister Rishi Sunak, and other UK politicians. Conservative politicians have proposed reform or withdrawal from the convention during the 2024 Conservative Party leadership election. After the September 2025 British cabinet reshuffle Labour Party officials said other member countries wanted Britain to play a leading role in reforming the convention, while opposition party Reform UK pledged to leave the ECHR to have free hand in deporting migrants. It has been argued by many academics and most recently the then-Justice Secretary, Shabana Mahmood, that rather than the Convention being the issue, it is rather the way in which the UK interprets the Convention domestically which tends to be more strict than most other State Parties.

== Membership ==
As of 2025, all 46 member states of the Council of Europe are High Contracting Parties to the Convention. Article 59 of the Convention states that it is open for signature by member states of the Council of Europe, and ratification of the Convention is a prerequisite for any state wishing to join the Council. Therefore, the membership of the two bodies is identical.

The Convention and its protocols are not open to states outside the Council of Europe. However, the Parliamentary Assembly of the Council of Europe may invite a non-member state to accede, though this power has not been used.

=== Former members ===
Russia was a party to the Convention from 1998 until 2022. Although it joined the Council of Europe in 1996, it ratified the Convention on 5 May 1998. Following Russia's full-scale invasion of Ukraine, the Committee of Ministers of the Council of Europe suspended Russia's rights of representation on 25 February 2022.

On 16 March 2022, Russia was formally excluded from the Council of Europe. As a legal consequence of its expulsion, Russia ceased to be a High Contracting Party to the Convention on 16 September 2022, after a six-month transitional period. The European Court of Human Rights remains competent to handle applications against Russia concerning violations that occurred before this date.

=== Accession by the European Union ===
An ongoing membership consideration is the accession of the European Union (EU) itself to the Convention. The EU is an international organisation, not a state, and its member states are already parties to the Convention.

The Treaty of Lisbon, which entered into force in 2009, made it a legal obligation for the EU to accede to the ECHR. Accession would subject the EU's institutions, including the Court of Justice of the European Union (CJEU), to the external human rights monitoring of the European Court of Human Rights. A draft accession agreement was finalised in 2013.

In 2019, the European Commission announced the EU's readiness to resume negotiations on accession to the ECHR. In 2020, the Council of Europe tasked the Steering Committee for Human Rights (CDDH), within the 46+1 negotiation group, with finalising the legal instruments governing accession. Between 2020 and 2023, the group held multiple meetings and concluded negotiations on all issues except one concerning the CJEU's jurisdiction over alleged fundamental rights violations linked to the EU's common foreign and security policy. The EU undertook to resolve this matter internally and to keep the CDDH informed of developments.

On 17 March 2023, the Draft agreement on the accession of the European Union to the Convention for the Protection of Human Rights and Fundamental Freedoms was adopted. This draft agreement would allow the European Union to take part in the defence of respondent States before the European Court of Human Rights (ECtHR) through a co-respondent mechanism. Likewise, the European Union would accede to the Convention as well as to its Additional Protocol No. 1 and No. 6, but not to No. 13, concerning the total abolition of the death penalty, even though it has already been ratified by all its Member States. As this is an amending protocol, all States Parties to the Convention will have to ratify it for it to enter into force. The finalization of the process has since hinged on resolving the remaining legal complexities surrounding the CFSP and the formal ratification requirements.

This draft requires the referral of the matter to the CJEU and the obtaining of a favourable opinion before the signature procedure can begin. This referral ultimately took place on 26 January 2026. The time between this referral and the delivery of the opinion is estimated at between 18 and 24 months.

== Drafting ==
The convention is drafted in broad terms, in a similar (albeit more modern) manner to the 1689 Scottish Claim of Right Act 1689, to the 1689 English Bill of Rights, the 1791 U.S. Bill of Rights, the 1789 French Declaration of the Rights of Man and of the Citizen, or the first part of the German Basic Law. Statements of principle are, from a juridical point of view, not determinative and require and have given occasion to extensive interpretation by courts to bring out meaning in particular factual situations.

== Convention articles ==
As amended by Protocol 11, the convention consists of three parts. The main rights and freedoms are contained in Section I, which consists of Articles 2 to 18. Section II (Articles 19 to 51) sets up the court and its rules of operation. Section III contains various concluding provisions.

Before the entry into force of Protocol 11, Section II (Article 19) set up the commission and the court, Sections III (Articles 20 to 37) and IV (Articles 38 to 59) included the high-level machinery for the operation of, respectively, the commission and the court, and Section V contained various concluding provisions.

Many of the articles in Section I are structured in two paragraphs: the first sets out a basic right or freedom (such as Article 2(1) – the right to life) but the second contains exclusions, exceptions or limitations on the basic right (such as Article 2(2) – which excepts certain uses of force leading to death).

=== Article 1 – respecting rights ===
Article 1 simply binds the signatory parties to secure the rights under the other articles of the convention "within their jurisdiction". In exceptional cases, "jurisdiction" may not be confined to a contracting state's own national territory; the obligation to secure convention rights then also extends to foreign territories, such as occupied land in which the state exercises effective control.

In Loizidou v Turkey, the European Court of Human Rights ruled that jurisdiction of member states to the convention extended to areas under that state's effective control as a result of military action.

=== Article 2 – life ===
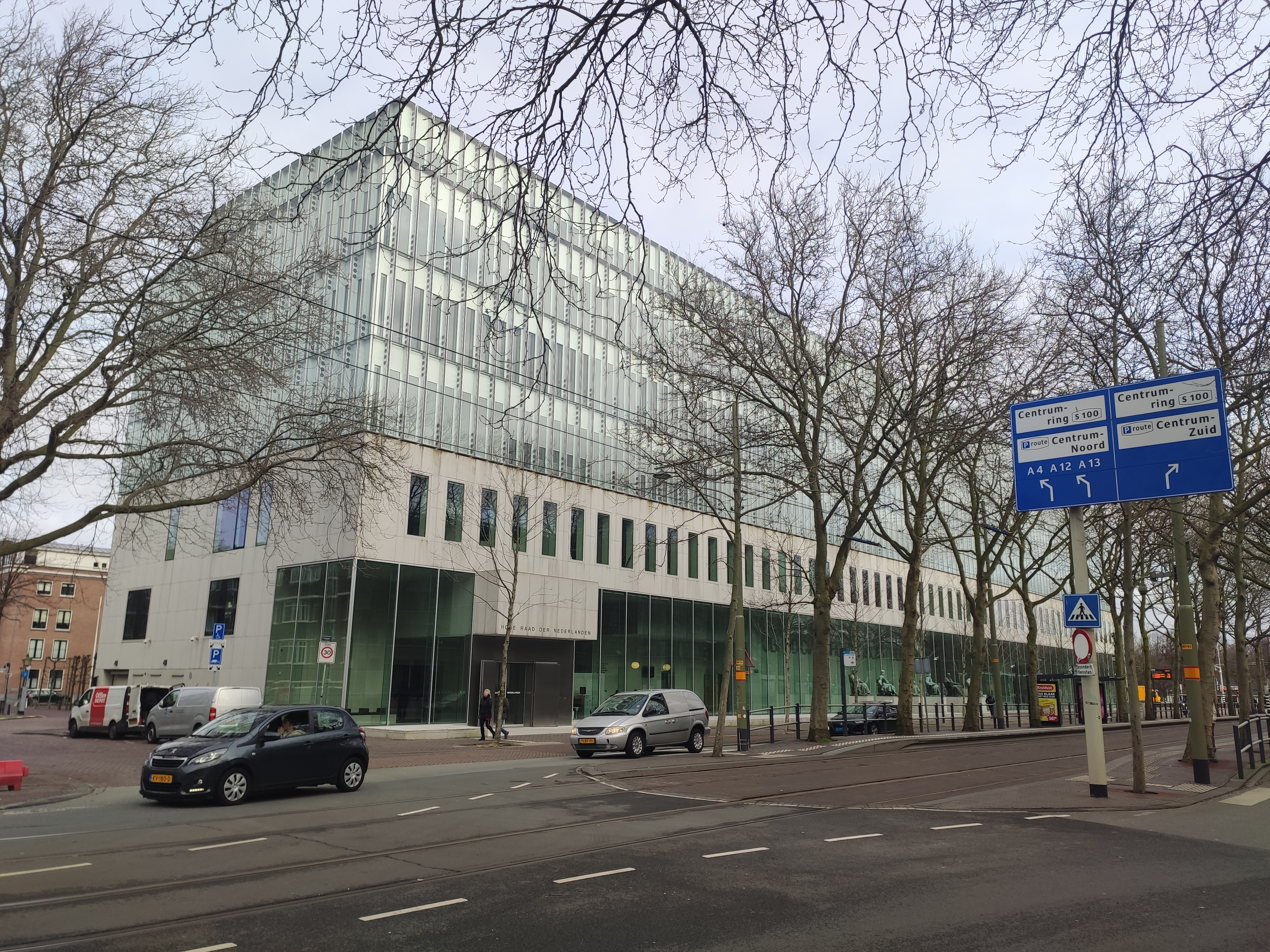
In 2019, the Supreme Court of the Netherlands cited the article 2 of the ECHR to say that the government must limit climate change to protect human health.

Article 2 protects the right of every person to their life. The right to life extends only to human beings, not to animals, nor to "legal persons" such as corporations. In Evans v United Kingdom, the court ruled that the question of whether the right to life extends to a human embryo fell within a state's margin of appreciation. In Vo v France, the court declined to extend the right to life to an unborn child, while stating that "it is neither desirable, nor even possible as matters stand, to answer in the abstract the question whether the unborn child is a person for the purposes of Article 2 of the Convention".

The court has ruled that states have three main duties under Article 2:

1. a duty to refrain from unlawful killing,
2. a duty to investigate suspicious deaths, and
3. in certain circumstances, a positive duty to prevent foreseeable loss of life.

The first paragraph of the article contains an exception for lawful executions, although this exception has largely been superseded by Protocols 6 and 13. Protocol 6 prohibits the imposition of the death penalty in peacetime, while Protocol 13 extends the prohibition to all circumstances.

The second paragraph of Article 2 provides that death resulting from defending oneself or others, arresting a suspect or fugitive, or suppressing riots or insurrections, will not contravene the Article when the use of force involved is "no more than absolutely necessary".

Signatory states to the convention can only derogate from the rights contained in Article 2 for deaths which result from lawful acts of war.

The European Court of Human Rights did not rule upon the right to life until 1995, when in McCann and Others v United Kingdom it ruled that the exception contained in the second paragraph does not constitute situations when it is permitted to kill, but situations where it is permitted to use force which might result in the deprivation of life.

=== Article 3 – torture ===
Article 3 prohibits torture and "inhuman or degrading treatment or punishment". There are no exceptions or limitations on this right. This provision usually applies, apart from torture, to cases of severe police violence and poor conditions in detention.

The court has emphasised the fundamental nature of Article 3 in holding that the prohibition is made in "absolute terms ... irrespective of the victim's conduct". The court has also held that states cannot deport or extradite individuals who might be subjected to torture, inhuman or degrading treatment or punishment, in the recipient state.

The first case to examine Article 3 was the Greek case, which set an influential precedent. In Ireland v. United Kingdom (1979–1980) the court ruled that the five techniques developed by the United Kingdom (wall-standing, hooding, subjection to noise, deprivation of sleep, and deprivation of food and drink), as used against fourteen detainees in Northern Ireland by the United Kingdom were "inhuman and degrading" and breached the European Convention on Human Rights, but did not amount to "torture".

In Aksoy v. Turkey (1997) the court found Turkey guilty of torture in 1996 in the case of a detainee who was suspended by his arms while his hands were tied behind his back.

Selmouni v. France (2000) the court has appeared to be more open to finding states guilty of torture ruling that since the convention is a "living instrument", treatment which it had previously characterized as inhuman or degrading treatment might in future be regarded as torture.

In 2014, after new information was uncovered that showed the decision to use the five techniques in Northern Ireland in 1971–1972 had been taken by British ministers, the Irish Government asked the European Court of Human Rights to review its judgement. In 2018, by six votes to one, the court declined.

=== Article 4 – servitude ===
Article 4 prohibits slavery, servitude and forced labour but exempts labour:

- done as a normal part of imprisonment,
- in the form of compulsory military service or work done as an alternative by conscientious objectors,
- required to be done during a state of emergency, and
- considered to be a part of a person's normal "civic obligations".

=== Article 5 – liberty and security ===
Article 5 provides that everyone has the right to liberty and security of person. Liberty and security of the person are taken as a "compound" concept – security of the person has not been subject to separate interpretation by the court.

Article 5 provides the right to liberty, subject only to lawful arrest or detention under certain other circumstances, such as arrest on reasonable suspicion of a crime or imprisonment in fulfilment of a sentence. The article also provides those arrested with the right to be informed, in a language they understand, of the reasons for the arrest and any charge they face, the right of prompt access to judicial proceedings to determine the legality of the arrest or detention, to trial within a reasonable time or release pending trial, and the right to compensation in the case of arrest or detention in violation of this article.

- Assanidze v. Georgia, App. No. 71503/01 (Eur. Ct. H.R. 8 April 2004) – breach by subnational authorities refusing to follow a Supreme Court order to release the prisoner

=== Article 6 – fair trial ===
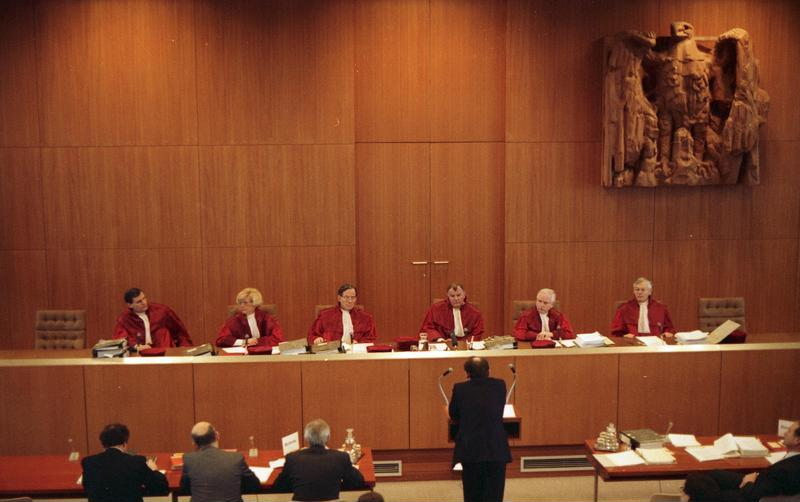
The right to a fair trial, proclaimed in Article 6, is one of the most invoked by applicants.

Article 6 provides a detailed right to a fair trial, including the right to a public hearing before an independent and impartial tribunal within reasonable time, the presumption of innocence, and other minimum rights for those charged with a criminal offence (adequate time and facilities to prepare their defence, access to legal representation, right to examine witnesses against them or have them examined, right to the free assistance of an interpreter).

The majority of convention violations found by the court are excessive delays in violation of the "reasonable time" requirement, in civil and criminal proceedings before national courts, mostly in Italy and France. Under the "independent tribunal" requirement, the court has ruled that military judges in Turkish state security courts are incompatible with Article 6. In compliance with this Article, Turkey has since adopted a law abolishing these courts.

Another significant set of violations concerns the "confrontation clause" of Article 6 (i.e. the right to examine witnesses or have them examined). In this respect, problems of compliance with Article 6 may arise when national laws allow the use in evidence of the testimonies of absent, anonymous and vulnerable witnesses.

- Steel v. United Kingdom (1998) 28 EHRR 603 (the "McLibel" case): breach of article 6 due to "inequality of arms" in relation to a defamation case brought by a multinational corporation
- Assanidze v. Georgia [2004] ECHR 140: breach of Article 6 by subnational authorities refusing to follow superior court orders; the Court considered that Article 6 would be "illusory" if an acquittal was not followed by release
- Othman (Abu Qatada) v. United Kingdom (2012) – Abu Qatada could not be deported to Jordan as that would be a violation of Article 6 "given the real risk of the admission of evidence obtained by torture". This was the first time the court ruled that such an expulsion would be a violation of Article 6. The UK government subsequently deported Abu Qatada subject to diplomatic assurances that evidence obtained by torture would not be used at trial.

=== Article 7 – retroactivity ===
Article 7 prohibits the retroactive criminalisation of acts and omissions. No person may be punished for an act that was not a criminal offence at the time of its commission. The article states that a criminal offence is one under either national or international law, which would permit a party to prosecute someone for a crime which was not illegal under domestic law at the time, so long as it was prohibited by international law. The Article also prohibits a heavier penalty being imposed than was applicable at the time when the criminal act was committed.

Article 7 incorporates the legal principle nullum crimen, nulla poena sine lege (no crime, no penalty without law) into the convention.

Relevant cases are:

- Kokkinakis v. Greece [1993] ECHR 20: no breach of article 7 on the grounds that the relevant law was too vague

=== Article 8 – privacy ===
Article 8 provides a right to respect for one's "private and family life, his home and his correspondence", subject to restrictions that are "in accordance with law and is necessary in a democratic society in the interests of national security, public safety or the economic well-being of the country, for the prevention of disorder or crime, for the protection of health or morals, or for the protection of the rights and freedoms of others". This article clearly provides a right to be free of unlawful searches, but the court has given the protection for "private and family life" that this article provides a broad interpretation, taking for instance that prohibition of private consensual homosexual acts violates this article. There have been cases discussing consensual familial sexual relationships, and how the criminalisation of this may violate this article. However, the ECHR still allows such familial sexual acts to be criminal.

This may be compared to the jurisprudence of the United States Supreme Court, which has also adopted a somewhat broad interpretation of the right to privacy. Furthermore, Article 8 sometimes comprises positive obligations: whereas classical human rights are formulated as prohibiting a state from interfering with rights, and thus not to do something (e.g. not to separate a family under family life protection), the effective enjoyment of such rights may also include an obligation for the state to become active, and to do something (e.g. to enforce access for a divorced parent to his/her child).

Relevant cases:

- Malone v. United Kingdom [1984] ECHR 10, (1984) 7 EHRR 14: breach of article 8 due to inadequate laws regulating police wiretapping, confounded by the non-incorporation of the Convention into domestic law; remedied by the Interception of Communications Act 1985 and Human Rights Act 1998, respectively
- Goodwin v. United Kingdom (2002) ECHR 28957/95: requirement for transgender individuals to reveal their deadnames to employers was a breach; remedied by the Gender Recognition Act 2004
- Zakharov v. Russia [2015] ECHR 47143/06: breach of Article 8 due to inadequate safeguards against abuse of surveillance
- Oliari and Others v. Italy (2015): breach of Article 8 in lack of recognition of same-sex couples, though the Court stopped short of finding a corresponding breach of article 12 (right to marry); remedied by the introduction of civil unions into Italian law
- Vavřička and Others v. the Czech Republic (2021): a vaccination mandate for children was not a breach of Article 8

=== Article 9 – conscience and religion ===
Article 9 provides a right to freedom of thought, conscience and religion. This includes the freedom to change a religion or belief, and to manifest a religion or belief in worship, teaching, practice and observance, subject to certain restrictions that are "in accordance with law" and "necessary in a democratic society".

Relevant cases:

- Kokkinakis v. Greece (1993) (app. no. 14307/88): ban on ordinary (not "by improper means") proselytism by Jehovah's Witnesses constituted a breach
- Universelles Leben e.V. v. Germany (1996) (app. no. 29745/96): official information about the danger to the public posed by a religious organisation skeptical of conventional medicine was not a breach
- Buscarini and Others v. San Marino (1999) (app. no. 24645/94): requiring an oath on the Gospels for public office amounted to an impermissible religious test
- Pichon and Sajous v. France (2001) (app. no. 49853/99): requiring pharmacists to supply properly prescribed contraceptives contrary to their religious beliefs was not a breach of article 9
- Leyla Şahin v. Turkey (2004) (app. no. 44774/98): Turkish law banning the hijab at universities was not a breach of article 9
- Leela Förderkreis E.V. and Others v. Germany (2008) (app. no. 58911/00): language used to describe fringe religious groups in information published by federal agencies was not a breach of Article 9
- Lautsi v. Italy (2011) (app. no. 30814/06): legal requirement to display crucifixes in school classrooms was not a breach of Article 9
- S.A.S. v. France (2014) (app. no. 43835/11): the Court accepted France's opinion that a ban on full face coverings was "necessary in a democratic society" and thus not a breach of Article 9
- Eweida v. United Kingdom [2013] ECHR 2013 (app. nos. 48420/10, 59842/10, 51671/10 and 36516/10): breach of article 9 in failing to strike the correct balance between British Airways' corporate rights to establish their brand and a worker's right to express her religion by wearing a crucifix

=== Article 10 – expression ===
Article 10 provides the right to freedom of expression, subject to certain restrictions that are "in accordance with law" and "necessary in a democratic society". This right includes the freedom to hold opinions, and to receive and impart information and ideas, but allows restrictions for:

- interests of national security
- territorial integrity or public safety
- prevention of disorder or crime
- protection of health or morals
- protection of the reputation or the rights of others
- preventing the disclosure of information received in confidence
- maintaining the authority and impartiality of the judiciary

Relevant cases:

- Lingens v. Austria (1986) 8 EHRR 407: held that defamation law must make a distinction between statements of opinion (which by their nature cannot be proved true) and of fact (which can in principle).
- The Observer and The Guardian v. United Kingdom (1991) 14 EHRR 153, the "Spycatcher" case: a ban on newspapers in England and Wales (and nowhere else) reporting about a book which was freely published abroad, and even in Scotland, and freely discussed in newspapers there, was a breach of article 10.
- Bowman v. United Kingdom (1998) 26 EHRR 1: an excessively low limit on election campaign spending was a breach of article 10.
- Appleby v. United Kingdom (2003) 37 EHRR 38: prohibition on protests in a quasi-public space (a privately owned shopping centre) was not a breach.
- TV Vest and Rogaland Pensioners Party v. Norway (2008): a blanket ban on political advertising on television was a breach of article 10.

=== Article 11 – association ===
Article 11 protects the right to freedom of assembly and association, including the right to form trade unions, subject to certain restrictions that are "in accordance with law" and "necessary in a democratic society". Relevant cases:

- Vogt v. Germany (1995): applying Berufsverbot (professional bar based on membership of a communist party) to a profession (secondary school teacher) that did not involve any security risks was a breach of Article 11.
- United Communist Party of Turkey v. Turkey (1998) 26 EHRR 1211: while recognising that dissolving a party opposed to peaceful and democratic politics can be a justifiable interference with rights under Article 11, the Constitutional Court's reasoning, including the word "communist" in its name and recognition of the Kurdish people as a national minority, did not justify the interference.
- Yazar, Karatas, Aksoy and Hep v. Turkey (2003) 36 EHRR 59: there was insufficient evidence to raise a concern which would have justified as necessary in a democratic society the dissolution, in spite of Article 11, of the People's Labour Party, also a pro-Kurdish party.
- Bączkowski and Others v. Poland (2005): banning a Pride parade was a breach.

=== Article 12 – marriage ===
Article 12 provides a right for women and men of marriageable age to marry and establish a family.

Despite multiple invitations, the court has so far refused to apply the protections of this article to same-sex marriage. The court has defended this on the grounds that the article was intended to apply only to different-sex marriage, and that a wide margin of appreciation must be granted to parties in this area.

In Goodwin v. United Kingdom the court ruled that a law which still classified post-operative transsexual people under their birth sex violated article 12 as it meant that transsexual people were unable to marry individuals of the opposite sex. This reversed an earlier ruling in Rees v. United Kingdom. This did not, however, alter the Court's understanding that Article 12 protects only different-sex couples.

The European Court of Human Rights ruled in Schalk and Kopf v. Austria that countries are not required to provide marriage licenses for same-sex couples; however, if a country allows same-sex couple marriage it must be done under the same conditions that opposite-sex couples marriage face, in order to prevent a breach of article 14 – the prohibition of discrimination. Additionally, the court ruled in the 2015 case of Oliari and Others v. Italy that states have a positive obligation to ensure there is a specific legal framework for the recognition and protection of same-sex couples.

=== Article 13 – effective remedy ===
Article 13 provides for the right for an effective remedy before national authorities for violations of rights under the convention. The inability to obtain a remedy before a national court for an infringement of a Convention right is thus a free-standing and separately actionable infringement of the convention.

=== Article 14 – discrimination ===
Article 14 contains a prohibition of discrimination. This prohibition is broad in some ways and narrow in others. It is broad in that it prohibits discrimination under a potentially unlimited number of grounds. While the article specifically prohibits discrimination based on "sex, race, colour, language, religion, political or other opinions, national or social origin, association with a national minority, property, birth or other status", the last of these allows the court to extend to Article 14 protection to other grounds not specifically mentioned such as has been done regarding discrimination based on a person's sexual orientation.

At the same time, the article's protection is limited in that it only prohibits discrimination with respect to rights under the convention. Thus, an applicant must prove discrimination in the enjoyment of a specific right that is guaranteed elsewhere in the convention (e.g. discrimination based on sex – Article 14 – in the enjoyment of the right to freedom of expression – Article 10).

Protocol 12 extends this prohibition to cover discrimination in any legal right, even when that legal right is not protected under the convention, so long as it is provided for in national law.

=== Article 15 – derogations ===
Article 15 allows contracting states to derogate from certain rights guaranteed by the convention in a time of "war or other public emergency threatening the life of the nation". Permissible derogations under article 15 must meet three substantive conditions:

1. there must be a public emergency threatening the life of the nation;
2. any measures taken in response must be "strictly required by the exigencies of the situation"; and
3. the measures taken in response to it must be in compliance with a state's other obligations under international law.

In addition to these substantive requirements, the derogation must be procedurally sound. There must be some formal announcement of the derogation and notice of the derogation and any measures adopted under it, and the ending of the derogation must be communicated to the Secretary-General of the Council of Europe.

As of 2016, only eight member states had ever invoked derogations. The court is quite permissive in accepting a state's derogations from the convention but applies a higher degree of scrutiny in deciding whether measures taken by states under a derogation are, in the words of Article 15, "strictly required by the exigencies of the situation". Thus in A v United Kingdom, the court dismissed a claim that a derogation lodged by the British government in response to the 11 September attacks was invalid, but went on to find that measures taken by the United Kingdom under that derogation were disproportionate.

Examples of such derogations include:

- In the 1969 Greek case, the European Commission of Human Rights ruled that the derogation was invalid because the alleged Communist subversion did not pose a sufficient threat. This is the only time as of 2015 that the convention system has rejected an attempted derogation.
- Operation Demetrius—Internees arrested without trial pursuant to "Operation Demetrius" could not complain to the European Commission of Human Rights about breaches of Article 5 because on 27 June 1957, the UK lodged a notice with the Council of Europe declaring that there was a "public emergency within the meaning of Article 15(1) of the Convention".

=== Article 16 – foreign parties ===
Article 16 allows states to restrict the political activity of foreigners. The court has ruled that European Union member states cannot consider the nationals of other member states to be aliens.

=== Article 17 – abuse of rights ===
Article 17 provides that no one may use the rights guaranteed by the convention to seek the abolition or limitation of rights guaranteed in the convention. This addresses instances where states seek to restrict a human right in the name of another human right, or where individuals rely on a human right to undermine other human rights (for example where an individual issues a death threat).

- Communist Party of Germany v. the Federal Republic of Germany (1957), the Commission refused to consider the appeal by the Communist Party of Germany, stating that the communist doctrine advocated by them is incompatible with the convention, citing article 17's limitations on the rights to the extent necessarily to prevent their subversion by adherents of a totalitarian doctrine.

=== Article 18 – permitted restrictions ===
Article 18 provides that any limitations on the rights provided for in the convention may be used only for the purpose for which they are provided. For example, Article 5, which guarantees the right to personal freedom, may be explicitly limited in order to bring a suspect before a judge. To use pre-trial detention as a means of intimidation of a person under a false pretext is, therefore, a limitation of right (to freedom) which does not serve an explicitly provided purpose (to be brought before a judge), and is therefore contrary to Article 18.

== Convention protocols ==
As of July 2025, seventeen protocols to the convention have been opened for signature. These can be divided into two main groups: those amending the framework of the convention system, and those expanding the rights that can be protected. The former require unanimous ratification by member states before coming into force, while the latter require a certain number of states to sign before coming into force.

=== Protocol 1 ===
This Protocol contains three different rights which the signatories could not agree to place in the convention itself. Monaco and Switzerland have signed but never ratified Protocol 1.

==== Article 1 – property ====
Article 1 ("A1P1") provides that "every natural or legal person is entitled to the peaceful enjoyment of his possessions". The European Court of Human Rights acknowledged a violation of the fair balance between the demands of the general interest of the community and the requirements of the protection of the individual's fundamental rights, also, in the uncertainty – for the owner – about the future of the property, and in the absence of an allowance.

In the case of Mifsud and others v Malta (38770/17) the Maltese state was found to have violated Article 1 of Protocol No. 1 to the convention. The case involved a plot of land owned by the Mifsud family and their heirs which was expropriated twice (in 1984 and in 2012). The court, in its judgment, stated that

the [Maltese] Constitutional Court had no basis on which to ground its finding. The Court is disconcerted by the circumstances of the present case which led to an expropriation of property being endorsed without anyone being able to assert the reasons behind such an expropriation.

In 2013 the Court of Appeal in England and Wales upheld a judgment in favour of Infinis against Ofgem, who had denied the company access to Renewable Obligation Certificates, a form of funding incentive for renewable energy generation, to which they were entitled. This case represented the first UK case where A1P1 compensation had been granted in relation to a regulatory authority.

==== Article 2 – education ====
Article 2 ("A2P1") provides for the right not to be denied an education and the right for parents to have their children educated in accordance with their religious and other views. It does not however guarantee any particular level of education of any particular quality.

Although phrased in the Protocol as a negative right, in Şahin v. Turkey the court ruled that:

it would be hard to imagine that institutions of higher education existing at a given time do not come within the scope of the first sentence of Article 2 of Protocol No 1. Although that Article does not impose a duty on the Contracting States to set up institutions of higher education, any State doing so will be under an obligation to afford an effective right of access to them. In a democratic society, the right to education, which is indispensable to the furtherance of human rights, plays such a fundamental role that a restrictive interpretation of the first sentence of Article 2 of Protocol No. 1 would not be consistent with the aim or purpose of that provision.

==== Article 3 – elections ====
Article 3 provides for the right to elections performed by secret ballot, that are also free and that occur at regular intervals.

- Matthews v. United Kingdom (1999) 28 EHRR 361

=== Protocol 4 – civil imprisonment, free movement, expulsion ===
Article 1 prohibits the imprisonment of people for inability to fulfil a contract. Article 2 provides for a right to freely move within a country once lawfully there and for a right to leave any country. Article 3 prohibits the expulsion of nationals and provides for the right of an individual to enter a country of their nationality. Article 4 prohibits the collective expulsion of foreigners.

Turkey and the United Kingdom have signed but never ratified Protocol 4. Greece and Switzerland have neither signed nor ratified this protocol.

The United Kingdom's failure to ratify this protocol is due to concerns over the interaction of Article 2 and Article 3 with British nationality law. Specifically, several classes of "British national" (such as British National (Overseas)) do not have the right of abode in the United Kingdom and are subject to immigration control there. In 2009, the UK government stated that it had no plans to ratify Protocol 4 because of concerns that those articles could be taken as conferring that right.

=== Protocol 6 – restriction of death penalty ===
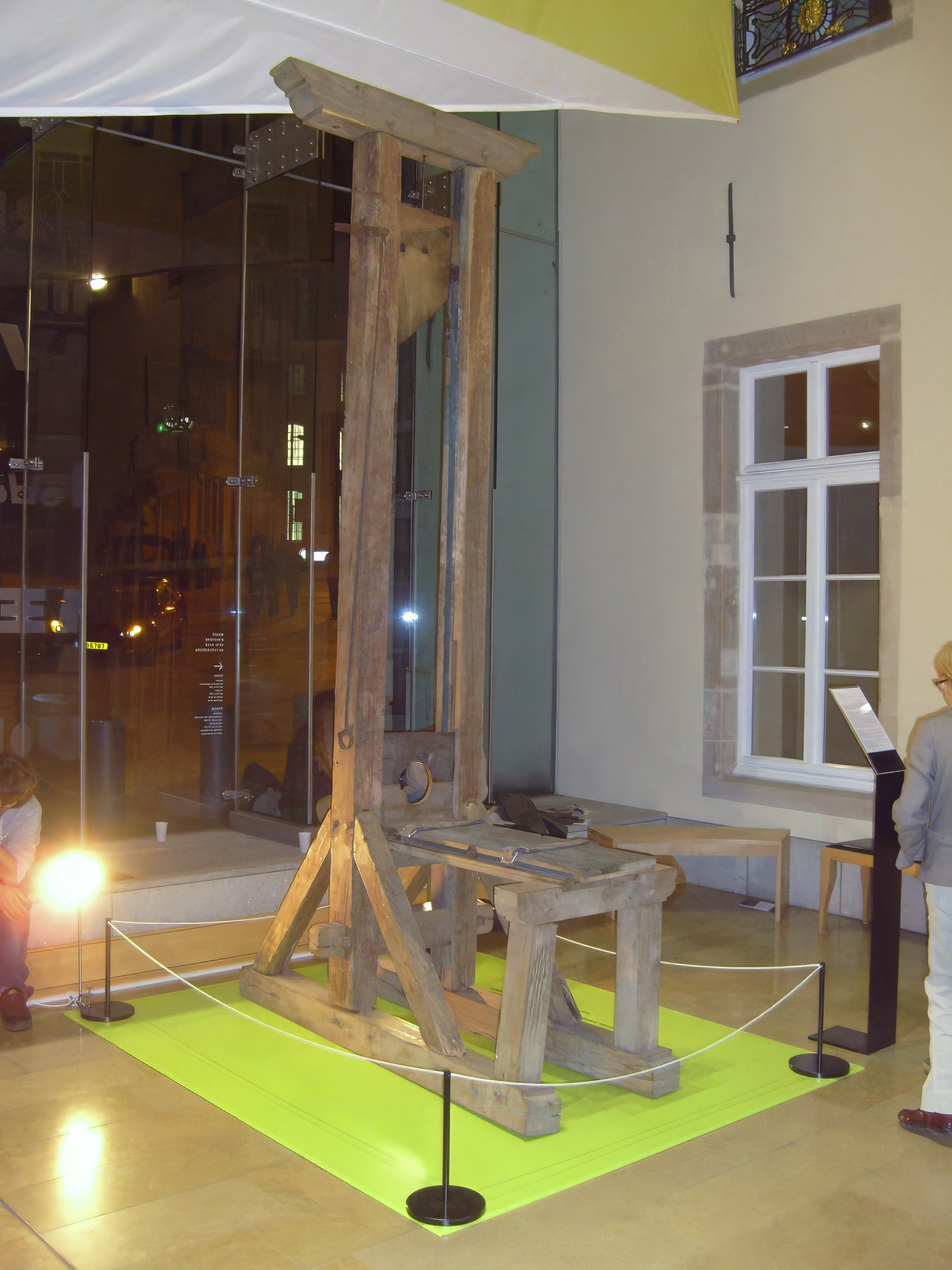
Guillotine at the National Museum of Archaeology, History and Art in Luxembourg. Protocols 6 and 13 aim to abolish the death penalty in Europe.

Article 6 requires parties to restrict the application of the death penalty except for "acts committed in time of war" or of "imminent threat of war".

Every Council of Europe member state has signed and ratified Protocol 6.

=== Protocol 7 – crime and family ===
- Article 1 provides for a right to fair procedures for lawfully resident foreigners facing expulsion.
- Article 2 provides for the right to appeal in criminal matters.
- Article 3 provides for compensation for the victims of miscarriages of justice.
- Article 4 prohibits the re-trial of anyone who has already been finally acquitted or convicted of a particular offence (double jeopardy).
- Article 5 provides for equality between spouses.

Despite having signed the protocol more than thirty years ago Germany and the Netherlands have never ratified it. Turkey, which signed the protocol in 1985, ratified it in 2016, becoming the latest member state to do so. The United Kingdom has neither signed nor ratified the protocol.

=== Protocol 12 – discrimination ===
Protocol 12 applies the current expansive and indefinite grounds of prohibited discrimination in Article 14 to the exercise of any legal right and to the actions (including the obligations) of public authorities. The additional scope of the Protocol covers four categories of cases:

- Cases where a person is subjected to discrimination in the enjoyment of any right specifically conferred upon the individual by national law (and not solely rights provided under the Convention);
- Cases where a person is subjected to discrimination in the enjoyment of any right arising from clear obligations imposed upon public authorities under national law (where such authorities are legally obliged to act in a particular manner);
- Cases involving discrimination by public authorities in the exercise of discretionary powers (such as grants or subsidies);
- Cases involving discrimination resulting from other acts or omissions by public authorities (for instance, the conduct of law enforcement officials in quelling a riot).

The Protocol entered into force on 1 April 2005 and has (as of March 2018) been ratified by 20 member states. Several member states—Bulgaria, Denmark, France, Lithuania, Monaco, Poland, Sweden, Switzerland, and the United Kingdom—have not signed the protocol.

The United Kingdom government has declined to sign Protocol 12 on the basis that they believe the wording of protocol is too wide and would result in a flood of new cases testing the extent of the new provision. They believe that the phrase "rights set forth by law" might include international conventions to which the UK is not a party, and would result in incorporation of these instruments by stealth.

It has been suggested that the protocol is therefore in a catch-22, since the UK will decline to either sign or ratify the protocol until the European Court of Human Rights has addressed the meaning of the provision, while the court is hindered in doing so by the lack of applications to the court concerning the protocol caused by the decisions of Europe's most populous states—including the UK—not to ratify the protocol. The UK government, nevertheless, stated in 2004 that it "agrees in principle that the ECHR should contain a provision against discrimination that is free-standing and not parasitic on the other Convention rights". The first judgment that found a violation of Protocol No. 12, Sejdić and Finci v. Bosnia and Herzegovina, was delivered in 2009.

=== Protocol 13 – complete abolition of death penalty ===
Protocol 13 provides for the total abolition of the death penalty. Currently all Council of Europe member states but Azerbaijan have ratified Protocol 13.

However, account must be taken of the position of the Court, which in practice has regarded the Convention as prohibiting the death penalty. In its 2010 judgment in Al-Saadoon and Mufdhi v. the United Kingdom, the Court held that Article 2 and Article 3 of the Convention prohibit the death penalty, owing to the general trend towards its abolition among the States Parties to the Convention. This prohibition applies to all States Parties to the Convention, including those which have not ratified Protocol 13.

Accordingly, the ratification of this Protocol is now essentially symbolic: it demonstrates a State Party’s voluntary commitment to the abolitionist trend in Europe, without constituting an obligation to which it is compelled to adhere.

=== Protocol 16 – dialogue ===
Protocol 16 was adopted on 2 October 2013 and entered into force on 1 August 2018. It allows the highest national courts of ratifying States to request non-binding advisory opinions from the Court on questions of principle concerning the interpretation or application of the Convention. The purpose of this Protocol is to foster dialogue between courts and to strengthen the ‘constitutional’ role of the Court.

Only courts designated as the "highest" by each State can submit requests, which must relate to a pending domestic case and raise a question of principle. If the request is accepted by a five-judge panel, the Grand Chamber delivers the opinion; the national judge sits ex officio.

Advisory opinions are formally non-binding under Article 5 of the Protocol, but they carry strong persuasive weight in national proceedings and are generally followed by the Strasbourg Court in later cases.

Since its entry into force, the Court has received eleven requests and issued seven opinions. Topics addressed include surrogacy and recognition of parenthood (France), defamation and double jeopardy (Armenia), and adult adoption (Finland).

As of November 2025, twenty-six States have ratified the Protocol and three more have signed it without ratifying it.

=== Summary of ratifications of the substantive additional protocols ===
Signatures and ratifications, by additional protocol and by state party
State Party	P1	P4	P6	P7	P12	P13	P16
Albania	Ratified	Ratified	Ratified	Ratified	Ratified	Ratified	Ratified
Andorra	Ratified	Ratified	Ratified	Ratified	Ratified	Ratified	Ratified
Armenia	Ratified	Ratified	Ratified	Ratified	Ratified	Ratified	Ratified
Austria	Ratified	Ratified	Ratified	Ratified	Signed	Ratified	
Azerbaijan	Ratified	Ratified	Ratified	Ratified	Signed	Signed	Ratified
Belgium	Ratified	Ratified	Ratified	Ratified	Signed	Ratified	Ratified
Bosnia and Herzegovina	Ratified	Ratified	Ratified	Ratified	Ratified	Ratified	Ratified
Bulgaria	Ratified	Ratified	Ratified	Ratified		Ratified	
Croatia	Ratified	Ratified	Ratified	Ratified	Ratified	Ratified	
Cyprus	Ratified	Ratified	Ratified	Ratified	Ratified	Ratified	
Czech Republic	Ratified	Ratified	Ratified	Ratified	Signed	Ratified	
Denmark	Ratified	Ratified	Ratified	Ratified		Ratified	
Estonia	Ratified	Ratified	Ratified	Ratified	Signed	Ratified	Ratified
Finland	Ratified	Ratified	Ratified	Ratified	Ratified	Ratified	Ratified
France	Ratified	Ratified	Ratified	Ratified		Ratified	Ratified
Georgia	Ratified	Ratified	Ratified	Ratified	Ratified	Ratified	Ratified
Germany	Ratified	Ratified	Ratified	Signed	Signed	Ratified	
Greece	Ratified		Ratified	Ratified	Signed	Ratified	Ratified
Hungary	Ratified	Ratified	Ratified	Ratified	Signed	Ratified	
Iceland	Ratified	Ratified	Ratified	Ratified	Signed	Ratified	
Ireland	Ratified	Ratified	Ratified	Ratified	Signed	Ratified	
Italy	Ratified	Ratified	Ratified	Ratified	Signed	Ratified	Signed
Latvia	Ratified	Ratified	Ratified	Ratified	Signed	Ratified	Ratified
Liechtenstein	Ratified	Ratified	Ratified	Ratified	Signed	Ratified	
Lithuania	Ratified	Ratified	Ratified	Ratified		Ratified	Ratified
Luxembourg	Ratified	Ratified	Ratified	Ratified	Ratified	Ratified	Ratified
Malta	Ratified	Ratified	Ratified	Ratified	Ratified	Ratified	
Moldova	Ratified	Ratified	Ratified	Ratified	Signed	Ratified	Ratified
Monaco	Signed	Ratified	Ratified	Ratified		Ratified	Ratified
Montenegro	Ratified	Ratified	Ratified	Ratified	Ratified	Ratified	Ratified
Netherlands	Ratified	Ratified	Ratified	Signed	Ratified	Ratified	Ratified
North Macedonia	Ratified	Ratified	Ratified	Ratified	Ratified	Ratified	Ratified
Norway	Ratified	Ratified	Ratified	Ratified	Signed	Ratified	Signed
Poland	Ratified	Ratified	Ratified	Ratified		Ratified	
Portugal	Ratified	Ratified	Ratified	Ratified	Ratified	Ratified	
Romania	Ratified	Ratified	Ratified	Ratified	Ratified	Ratified	Ratified
San Marino	Ratified	Ratified	Ratified	Ratified	Ratified	Ratified	Ratified
Serbia	Ratified	Ratified	Ratified	Ratified	Ratified	Ratified	
Slovakia	Ratified	Ratified	Ratified	Ratified	Signed	Ratified	Ratified
Slovenia	Ratified	Ratified	Ratified	Ratified	Ratified	Ratified	Ratified
Spain	Ratified	Ratified	Ratified	Ratified	Ratified	Ratified	Ratified
Sweden	Ratified	Ratified	Ratified	Ratified		Ratified	Ratified
Switzerland	Signed		Ratified	Ratified		Ratified	
Turkey	Ratified	Signed	Ratified	Ratified	Signed	Ratified	Signed
Ukraine	Ratified	Ratified	Ratified	Ratified	Ratified	Ratified	Ratified
United Kingdom	Ratified	Signed	Ratified			Ratified	
Ratifications (total)	44/46	42/46	46/46	43/46	20/46	45/46	26/46
Signatories only (total)	2/2	2/4	0	2/3	17/26	1/1	3/20
Non-signatories (total)	0	2	0	1	9	0	17

=== Procedural and institutional protocols ===
The convention's provisions affecting institutional and procedural matters have been altered several times by means of protocols. These amendments have, with the exception of Protocol 2, amended the text of the convention. Protocol 2 did not amend the text of the convention as such but stipulated that it was to be treated as an integral part of the text. All of these protocols have required the unanimous ratification of all the member states of the Council of Europe to enter into force.

==== Protocol 11 ====
Protocols 2, 3, 5, 8, 9 and 10 have now been superseded by Protocol 11 which entered into force on 1 November 1998. It established a fundamental change in the machinery of the convention. It abolished the commission, allowing individuals to apply directly to the court, which was given compulsory jurisdiction and altered the latter's structure. Previously states could ratify the convention without accepting the jurisdiction of the Court of Human Rights. The protocol also abolished the judicial functions of the Committee of Ministers.

==== Protocol 14 ====
Protocol 14 follows on from Protocol 11 in proposing to further improve the efficiency of the court. It seeks to "filter" out cases that have less chance of succeeding along with those that are broadly similar to cases brought previously against the same member state. Furthermore, a case will not be considered admissible where an applicant has not suffered a "significant disadvantage". This latter ground can only be used when an examination of the application on the merits is not considered necessary and where the subject-matter of the application had already been considered by a national court.

A new mechanism was introduced by Protocol 14 to assist enforcement of judgements by the Committee of Ministers. The committee can ask the court for an interpretation of a judgement and can even bring a member state before the court for non-compliance of a previous judgement against that state. Protocol 14 also allows for European Union accession to the convention. The protocol has been ratified by every Council of Europe member state, Russia being last in February 2010. It entered into force on 1 June 2010.

A provisional Protocol 14bis had been opened for signature in 2009. Pending the ratification of Protocol 14 itself, 14bis was devised to allow the court to implement revised procedures in respect of the states which have ratified it. It allowed single judges to reject manifestly inadmissible applications made against the states that have ratified the protocol. It also extended the competence of three-judge chambers to declare applications made against those states admissible and to decide on their merits where there already is a well-established case law of the court. Now that all Council of Europe member states have ratified Protocol 14, Protocol 14bis has lost its raison d'être and according to its own terms ceased to have any effect when Protocol 14 entered into force on 1 June 2010.

==== Protocol 15 ====
Protocol 15, opened for signature by the States Parties on 24 June 2013 and entered into force on 1 August 2021, amends the Convention by introducing a reference to the principle of subsidiarity and to the margin of appreciation left to national judges in the interpretation of the Convention. With Protocol 15, the time limit for lodging an application with the Court is reduced from six to four months from the date of the final national decision. In addition, judges are no longer eligible for election after the age of 65, which allows them to complete a full term of office. Finally, the Court may declare an application inadmissible even if the case has not been examined by a domestic court.

== See also ==
- Strasbourg Observers
- Capital punishment in Europe
- Charter of Fundamental Rights of the European Union
- European Social Charter
- Human Rights Act 1998 for how the convention has been incorporated into the law of the United Kingdom.
- Human rights in Europe
- Territorial scope of European Convention on Human Rights
- European Convention on Human Rights Act 2003 Irish Act similar to the British Human Rights Act 1998.
- International Institute of Human Rights
- United Kingdom constitutional law
- Council of Europe
- Congress of Europe
- Community Charter of the Fundamental Social Rights of Workers
- Universal Declaration of Human Rights
- International Covenant on Civil and Political Rights
