= Protocol 13 to the European Convention on Human Rights =

Protocol 13 to the European Convention on Human Rights abolishes the death penalty, even in times of war, annulling Article 2 of the Convention, which permitted death to be inflicted "in execution of a capital sentence pronounced by a court of law where the offence is punishable by that penalty by law."

Of the 46 Contracting States to the Convention, 45 States (all except Azerbaijan) have signed and ratified Protocol No. 13:

1. Albania
2. Andorra
3. Armenia
4. Austria
5. Belgium
6. Bosnia and Herzegovina
7. Bulgaria
8. Cyprus
9. Croatia
10. Czech Republic
11. Denmark
12. Estonia
13. Finland
14. France
15. Georgia
16. Germany
17. Greece
18. Holland
19. Hungary
20. Ireland
21. Iceland
22. Italy
23. Latvia
24. Liechtenstein
25. Lithuania
26. Luxemburg
27. Macedonia
28. Malta
29. Moldova
30. Montenegro
31. Monaco
32. Norway
33. Poland
34. Portugal
35. Romania
36. San Marino
37. Serbia
38. Slovakia
39. Slovenia
40. Spain
41. Sweden
42. Switzerland
43. Turkey
44. Ukraine
45. United Kingdom

== Al-Saadoon and Mufdhi v. the United Kingdom ==
In its 2010 judgment in Al-Saadoon and Mufdhi v. the United Kingdom, the Court concluded that Article 2 of the Convention prohibited the death penalty, given the general trend towards its abolition among States parties to the Convention. This prohibition applies to all State parties to the Convention, including those that have not ratified Protocol 13.

Thus, the ratification of this protocol is now essentially symbolic: it demonstrates the voluntary commitment of the State party to the abolitionist trend in Europe, without this being a requirement to which it would be forced to comply.
