= List of judgments of the Supreme Court of the United Kingdom =

This is a list of judgments given by the Supreme Court of the United Kingdom between the court's inception on 1 October 2009 and the most recent judgments. Cases are listed in order of their neutral citation and where possible a link to the official text of the decision in PDF format has been provided. The case summaries below are not official or authoritative.

Unless otherwise noted, cases were heard by a panel of 5 judges.

Cases involving Scots law are highlighted in orange. Cases involving Northern Irish law are highlighted in green.

- List of judgments of the Supreme Court of the United Kingdom delivered in 2009
- List of judgments of the Supreme Court of the United Kingdom delivered in 2010
- List of judgments of the Supreme Court of the United Kingdom delivered in 2011
- List of judgments of the Supreme Court of the United Kingdom delivered in 2012
- List of judgments of the Supreme Court of the United Kingdom delivered in 2013
- List of judgments of the Supreme Court of the United Kingdom delivered in 2014
- List of judgments of the Supreme Court of the United Kingdom delivered in 2015
- List of judgments of the Supreme Court of the United Kingdom delivered in 2016
- List of judgments of the Supreme Court of the United Kingdom delivered in 2017
- List of judgments of the Supreme Court of the United Kingdom delivered in 2018
- List of judgments of the Supreme Court of the United Kingdom delivered in 2019
- List of judgments of the Supreme Court of the United Kingdom delivered in 2020
- List of judgments of the Supreme Court of the United Kingdom delivered in 2021
- List of judgments of the Supreme Court of the United Kingdom delivered in 2022
- List of judgments of the Supreme Court of the United Kingdom delivered in 2023
- List of judgments of the Supreme Court of the United Kingdom delivered in 2024
- List of judgments of the Supreme Court of the United Kingdom delivered in 2025
- List of judgments of the Supreme Court of the United Kingdom delivered in 2026

== See also ==
- Supreme Court of the United Kingdom
- English law
  - Welsh law
- Scots law
- Northern Irish law
- Stare decisis
- UK constitutional law
- English criminal law
- UK tax law
- UK labour law
- UK company law
- UK insolvency law
- English tort law
- English contract law
- English trusts law
- English land law
