= List of judgments of the Supreme Court of the United Kingdom delivered in 2018 =

This is a list of the judgments given by the Supreme Court of the United Kingdom in the year 2018.

In 2018 Lady Hale of Richmond was the President of the Supreme Court; Lord Mance was the Deputy President.

The table lists judgments made by the court and the opinions of the judges in each case. Judges are treated as having concurred in another's judgment when they either formally attach themselves to the judgment of another or speak only to acknowledge their concurrence with one or more judges. Any judgment which reaches a conclusion which differs from the majority on one or more major points of the appeal has been treated as dissent.

All dates are for 2018 unless expressly stated otherwise.

== 2018 case summaries ==
Unless otherwise noted, cases were heard by a panel of 5 judges.

Cases involving Scots law are highlighted in orange. Cases involving Northern Irish law are highlighted in green.

Case name	Citation	Date	Legal subject	Summary of decision
R (Haralambous) v Crown Court at St Albans	[2018] UKSC 1	24 January	Constitutional law, Search and seizure	Closed material procedures could be used in a judicial review of a Crown Court decision and there was no minimum core of material that the government was required to disclose to the other party where such procedures were used.
R (Gibson) v Secretary of State for Justice	[2018] UKSC 2	24 January	Criminal Law, Magistrates' Courts Act 1980	The calculation of days to be taken of a prison term in respect of payments made towards a fine should be calculated by reference to the original confiscation order and should not include any interest that had accrued on the amount due.
R (Bancoult No 3) v Secretary of State for Foreign and Commonwealth Affairs	[2018] UKSC 3	8 February	Constitutional law	The establishment of a Marine Protected Area around the Chagos Islands was not unlawful. The decision made by David Miliband was made in his capacity as an MP and the Carltona Principle could not be invoked to impute an improper motive on civil servants.
Robinson v Chief Constable of West Yorkshire Police	[2018] UKSC 4	8 February	Tort law, Duty of care in English law	An elderly lady who was knocked to the ground during the attempted arrest of a drug dealer by police officers was owed a duty of care by the police officers involved.
B (Algeria) v Secretary of State for the Home Department	[2018] UKSC 5	8 February	Immigration law	The power to grant bail and impose bail conditions in respect of a person who is held pending deportation ceases to be lawful if there is no legal basis for detaining that person.
The Advocate General for Scotland v Romein	[2018] UKSC 6	8 February	Immigration law, British nationality law	Individuals born outside of the UK to British mothers between 1949 and 1983 can apply to be registered as British citizens, irrespective of whether their birth was registered at a British consulate.
HM Inspector of Health and Safety v Chevron North Sea Limited	[2018] UKSC 7	8 February	Labour law, Health and Safety at Work etc. Act 1974	A prohibition notice given under section 22 of the Health and Safety at Work etc. Act 1974 given in respect of corrosion to the stairways of a North Sea oil installation was capable of being appealed. In making the appeal the employer was able to take into account expert evidence produced after the date of the inspection.
In the matter of C (Children)	[2018] UKSC 8	14 February	Family law, Hague Convention on the Civil Aspects of International Child Abduction	Where a child has become habitually resident in England the a mandatory return to Australia could not be invoked under the Hague Convention on the Civil Aspects of International Child Abduction. Where a parent travels temporarily to another state then, should they decide not to return during the temporary period, this may amount of a 'repudiatory retention' for which the courts could order the return of the child.
SM (Algeria) v Entry Clearance Officer, UK Visa Section	[2018] UKSC 9	14 February	Immigration law	The court held that the cases of Sala v SSHD and Khan v SSHD had been wrongly decided. These cases had previously determined that there was no right of appeal against the refusal of an EEA Residence Card for extended family member. A further three questions were referred to the Court of Justice of the European Union in respect of matters relating to the Citizens' Rights Directive.
R (Mott) v Environment Agency	[2018] UKSC 10	14 February	Constitutional law, land law	The court confirmed that the Environment Agency had to pay compensation to Mott for restricting his fishing rights under ECHR Protocol 1, article 1, on the right to property .
Commissioner of Police of the Metropolis v DSD	[2018] UKSC 11	14 February	Tort law, Constitutional law	There was a positive obligation on police under ECHR article 3 to investigate women's allegations of rape against cab driver, John Worboys .
Barton v Wright Hassall LLP	[2018] UKSC 12	21 February	Civil Procedure Rules	By a majority decision, the court confirmed that litigants in person should not be granted a special status in civil litigation where they were seeking relief from sanctions for breaching the Civil Procedure Rules.
Steel v NRAM Ltd (formerly NRAM Plc)	[2018] UKSC 13	28 February	Tort law	Following Hedley Byrne and Caparo it was not reasonable to rely on a statement about a floating charge .
Burnden Holdings (UK) Ltd v Fielding	[2018] UKSC 14	28 February	Trust law, Limitation Act 1980	For the purpose of the Limitation Act 1980 the directors of a company are to be regarded as trustees of company property with the company being regarded as the beneficiary of the trust. Where a distribution in specie was made by the directors acting in this capacity, no period of limitation would apply to a claim brought against the directors.
Iceland Foods Ltd v Berry (Valuation Officer)	[2018] UKSC 15	7 March	Tax law	A supermarket's air handling system was not subject to rates under the Local Government Finance Act 1988 .
Reilly v Sandwell Metropolitan Borough Council	[2018] UKSC 16	14 March	Labour law	A headteacher was fairly dismissed for failing to disclose a relationship with a child sex offender .
Re Maguire	[2018] UKSC 17	21 March	Constitutional law	A criminal defendant was not entitled to be represented by a barrister under ECHR article 6 in a second trial when the barrister was being disciplined by the NI Bar Council .
Dryden v Johnson Matthey plc	[2018] UKSC 18	21 March	Tort law	Claimants who were exposed to chlorinated platinum salts, and had a heightened risk of allergy, had suffered an actionable personal injury .
JSC BTA Bank v Khrapunov	[2018] UKSC 19	21 March	Tort law	The tort of conspiracy would be committed by attempts to evade a freezing order .
Morris-Garner v One Step (Support) Ltd	[2018] UKSC 20	18 April	Contract law	Damages for breach of a restrictive covenant should be measured by the economic value of the right that is breached .
Gavin Edmondson Solicitors Ltd v Haven Insurance Company Ltd	[2018] UKSC 21	18 April	Equitable Lien	A court only has the power to intervene to enforce a solicitors expectation of payment where the solicitor had an enforceable claim for costs against his client and the usual method of enforcement of that claim (a solicitor's lien) was defeated by direct payment. Where such circumstances were met and payments were made directly from an insurer to a claimant, the insurer was required to pay the costs that would otherwise have been due to the solicitor.
Newcastle upon Tyne Hospitals NHS Foundation Trust v Haywood	[2018] UKSC 22	25 April 2018	Labour law	The notice of dismissal was only effective when an employee actually read a letter .
R v McCool, R v Harkin	[2018] UKSC 23	2 May	criminal law, Proceeds of Crime Act 2002	By a majority verdict, the court held that a confiscation order could not be made under the Proceeds of Crime Act 2002 in respect of offences which were committed prior to 24 March 2003. However, such orders could be made in respect of offences occurring after 24 March 2003 even where such offences were associated with other offences occurring before that date.
Rock Advertising Ltd v MWB Business Exchange Centres Ltd	[2018] UKSC 24	16 May	Contract law	An "entire agreement" clause was binding on a business, so its eviction for rent arrears was lawful despite an alleged oral agreement that it could renegotiate.
R (Gallaher Group Ltd) v Competition and Markets Authority	[2018] UKSC 25	16 May	Constitutional law	The Office of Fair Trading (now CMA) did not act unlawfully by treating different businesses differently in fulfilling its Competition Act 1998 duties.
Navigators Insurance Company Ltd v Atlasnavios-Navegacao LDA	[2018] UKSC 26	22 May	Commercial law, insurance law	A vessel that was confiscated following an inspection in Venezuela which found cocaine strapped to the vessel's hull did not give the owner the right to claim as a war loss under their war risk insurance. The loss arose from the infringement of customs regulations which was a risk that was expressly excluded from the insurance policy.
Human Rights Commission for Judicial Review (Northern Ireland : Abortion)	[2018] UKSC 27	7 June	Abortion in the United Kingdom, European Convention on Human Rights, Offences Against the Person Act 1861, Criminal Justice Act (Northern Ireland) 1945	The Northern Ireland Human Rights Commission did not have standing to bring proceedings in respect of whether provisions of the Offences against the Person Act 1861 and Criminal Justice Act (Northern Ireland) 1945 which made it a criminal offence to receive or perform an abortion in Northern Ireland (other than in very limited exceptions) were unlawful as a specific victim had not been identified. Despite the court having no standing to give judgement, a review of the law was recommended.
Cartier International AG v British Telecommunications Plc	[2018] UKSC 28	13 June	Intellectual property, Copyright, Designs and Patents Act 1988,	An internet service provider that incurs compliance costs tied to website blocking injunctions granted against trademark infringing websites is entitled to be indemnified by the trademark holder against certain costs of implementing and maintaining the blocking order.
Pimlico Plumbers Ltd v Smith	[2018] UKSC 29	13 June	Labour law	A plumber for a firm was a "worker" and entitled to the minimum wage and paid holidays despite a written contract asserting he was "self-employed".
Project Blue Ltd v Revenue and Customs	[2018] UKSC 30	13 June	Tax law, Finance Act 2003	The anti-avoidance provisions of the Finance Act 2003 prevented claim for sub-sale relief in respect of Stamp Duty Land Tax from being effective where the transaction was part of a Ijarah financing arrangement and 'alternative property finance relief' had been claimed by the counter party to the transaction.
JP Whitter (Water Well Engineers) Ltd v Revenue and Customs	[2018] UKSC 31	13 June	Constitutional law, Tax Law	HMRC is not required to take into account the consequences to a tax payer when revoking gross payment status in the Construction Industry Scheme under the Finance Act 2004. In particular revoking gross payment status is not incompatible with Article 1 of the European Convention on Human Rights.
R (Steinfeld and Keidan) v Secretary of State for International Development	[2018] UKSC 32	27 June	Constitutional law, ECHR article 8, ECHR article 14	The provisions of the Civil Partnership Act which only allowed for a civil partnership to be between two persons of the same sex was unlawful as the prohibition of different-sex couples was a breach of Article 14 of the European Convention on Human Rights (prohibition of discrimination) and Article 8 of the European Convention on Human Rights (the right to a private and family life).
Belhaj v Director of Public Prosecutions	[2018] UKSC 33	4 July	Criminal law, Justice and Security Act 2013	A judicial review of a prosecution amounted to criminal proceedings and therefore a closed material procedure (by which the material is disclosed to the court and a special advocate but not the appellants) could not be used as matter was not a civil procedure for which closed material procedures were specifically provided for under the Justice and Security Act 2013.
Goldman Sachs International v Novo Banco SA, Guardians of New Zealand Superannuation Fund and others v Novo Banco SA	[2018] UKSC 34	4 July	Insolvency law, European Bank Recovery and Resolution Directive	A loan of $835m made to Banco Espírito Santo in July 2014 was not transferred to Novo Banco following the failure of the former bank. Whilst the loan was governed by English law the banking reorganization was a matter of Portuguese law and the court was bound to recognize the effect of a decision under Portuguese banking law.
Revenue and Customs v Taylor Clark Leisure Plc	[2018] UKSC 35	11 July	Tax law, Value Added Tax	A company was not entitled to the repayment of VAT resulting form a successful reclaim for overpaid VAT from a former member of its VAT group. Instead where VAT had been overpaid by the representative member of the VAT group then only the representative member (or its agent) could make a claim for repayment.
R v Sally Lane and John Letts	[2018] UKSC 36	11 July	Terrorism financing Terrorism Act 2000	A couple charged with funding terrorism could be guilty of an offence under section 17 of the Terrorism Act 2000 even if they did not actually suspect that their money would be used for terrorist purposes. The test was whether a reasonable person would have "reasonable cause to suspect" the money would be used for such purposes.
Williams v London Borough of Hackney	[2018] UKSC 37	18 July	Children Act 1989, Article 8 of the European Convention on Human Rights	Section 20 of the Children Act 1989 (which allows a local authority to accommodate a child in need who requires accommodation) does not give local authorities any compulsory powers over parents or their children but the accommodation of children under this section may be lawful until such time as the parents make an unequivocal request for the children to be returned.
Mills v Mills	[2018] UKSC 38	18 July	Family law	Maintenance payments due from one former spouse to the other should not be increased where the cost of living of the spouse in receipt of the payments had increased due to a requirement to rents, which arose as a result of financial mismanagement of a lump sum that had previously been paid, which could have been used to acquire a property.
Prudential Assurance Company Ltd v Revenue and Customs	[2018] UKSC 39	25 July	Tax law, Advance Corporation Tax, Income and Corporation Taxes Act 1988	A credit for underlying foreign tax on portfolio dividends should be calculated by reference to the nominal tax rate of the foreign jurisdiction rather than the tax which was actually paid. Compound interest was not due from HMRC to the taxpayer in respect of tax levied in breach of EU law.
James-Bowen & Ors v Commissioner of Police of the Metropolis	[2018] UKSC 40	25 July	Negligence	The Commissioner of Police of the Metropolis did not owe a duty of care to officers in respect of safeguarding their economic and reputational interest where the Commissioner issue a public apology and was involved in litigation involving a previous arrest made by those officers.
Owens v Owens	[2018] UKSC 41	25 July	Family law, Matrimonial Causes Act 1973	Mrs Owens had failed to show that Mr Owns behavior had been sufficiently unreasonable for their marriage to have broken down irretrievably. In the absence of no-fault divorce law in England and Wales the court was therefore not able to grant a divorce to Mrs Owens.
R v Mackinlay	[2018] UKSC 42	25 July	Campaign finance, Representation of the People Act 1983	In a pre-trial appeal it was confirmed that property, goods, services or facilities transferred to or provided for the use or benefit of a candidate free of charge or at a discount were not required to be authorised by the candidate in order to be treated as election expenses.
Banca Nazionale del Lavoro SPA v Playboy Club London Ltd	[2018] UKSC 43	26 July	Tort law	BNL owed no duty of care to the Playboy Club when BNL gave a reference of creditworthiness to an associated company about a customer who subsequently gambled and lost large amounts of money .
Totel Ltd v Revenue and Customs	[2018] UKSC 44	26 July	Tax law	It did not breach the EU law principle of equivalence to require companies pay their VAT before appealing against an assessment for it, even the same rule does not occur for other UK taxes .
R (Bashir) v Secretary of State for the Home Department	[2018] UKSC 45	30 July	Immigration law, United Nations Convention Relating to the Status of Refugees, Cyprus Act 1960	In an interim judgement it was confirmed that the United Nations Convention Relating to the Status of Refugees applied to the Sovereign Base Areas of Akrotiri and Dhekelia but did not entitle the respondents to be resettled in the UK. Other matters related to the case were left to be decided in future judgements.
An NHS Trust v Y	[2018] UKSC 46	30 July	Constitutional law	It was not necessary to have a court order before withdrawing medical life support, unless there are conflicts of medical or family opinion .
R (AR) v Chief Constable of Greater Manchester Police	[2018] UKSC 47	30 July	Human Rights, Human Rights Act 1998, European Convention on Human Rights	The requirement to protect young and vulnerable people outweighed an individual's right to privacy under Article 8 of the European Convention on Human Rights in respect of the ability for a potential employer to obtain an Enhanced Criminal Record Check from the Disclosure and Barring Service and refuse employment as a result of information disclosed in such a check.
Re McLaughlin	[2018] UKSC 48	30 August	Constitutional law	The requirement to be married or a civil partner, as opposed to cohabiting, to get benefits when a partner dies was incompatible with ECHR article 14.
Lee v Ashers Baking Company Ltd and others	[2018] UKSC 49	10 October	Constitutional law	There was no right to require a baker to write a pro-gay marriage message on a cake, under ECHR article 9 and 10, when the bakers' personal religious views opposed this .
Darnley v Croydon Health Services NHS Trust	[2018] UKSC 50	10 October	Tort law	The NHS trust breached a duty of care by failing to see a patient promptly at A&E and properly advising on waiting times .
Nottingham City Council v Parr	[2018] UKSC 51	10 October	Land law, Housing Act 2004	The Housing Act 2004 allowed for a licence of a house in multiple occupation to limit occupation to a particular class of person (in this case students in full-time education).
Warner v Scapa Flow Charters	[2018] UKSC 52	17 October	Commercial law, Limitation Periods	The Prescription and Limitation (Scotland) Act 1973 had the effect of suspending the limitation period under the Athens Convention relating to the Carriage of Passengers and their Luggage by Sea. As such, individuals pursuing claims in Scotland could have three years to make a claim rather than the two years stated in the Athens Convention.
KO (Nigeria) v Secretary of State for the Home Department, IT (Jamaica) v Secretary of State for the Home Department, NS (Sri Lanka) and others v Secretary of State for the Home Department, Pereira (Appellant) v Secretary of State for the Home Department (Respondent)	[2018] UKSC 53	24 October	Immigration law, Nationality, Immigration and Asylum Act 2002	Misconduct by parents of a child should not form part of the assessment in determining whether a child should be removed from the UK under immigration law. Such misconduct should also not form part of the assessment as to whether Article 8 of the European Convention on Human Rights requires that the parent remain in the UK with the child.
Dooneen Ltd (t/a McGinness Associates) v Mond	[2018] UKSC 54	31 October	Trust law, Bankruptcy (Scotland) Act 1985	A payment protection insurance claim discovered after a former trustee has made a final dividend will re-vest in the debtor and the termination of the trust has the effect of discharging the debtor and re-investing in the debtor with the trust beneficiaries.
Barnardo's v Buckinghamshire	[2018] UKSC 55	7 November	Pensions, Trust Law	The trustees of a pension scheme for the benefit of staff of Barnardo's were not entitled to replace the Retail Price Index with the Consumer Price Index in calculating increases in pension payments. The specific wording of the pension scheme rules prevented such a change from being made.
Warner-Lambert Company LLC v Generics (UK) Ltd	[2018] UKSC 56	14 November	Patent Law, Patents Act 1977, European Patent Convention	Patents registered by Warner–Lambert did not meeting the appropriate test for plausibility and where therefore invalid for insufficiency but gave conflicting opinions on a number of other matters of patent law.
Regency Villas Title Ltd v Diamond Resorts (Europe) Ltd	[2018] UKSC 57	14 November	Property Law, Easement	Comprehensive rights granted to timeshare owners to use any enjoy sporting facilities (including indoor areas) in an adjacent leisure park satisfied the characteristics of easements and could be enforced by the timeshare owners.
Rhuppiah v Secretary of State for the Home Department	[2018] UKSC 58	14 November	Immigration law, Article 8 of the European Convention on Human Rights, Human Rights Act 1998, Nationality, Immigration and Asylum Act 2002	Anyone who, not being a UK citizen, has the right to reside in the UK but does not have the right to do so indefinitely, has a precarious status for the purpose of section 117B of the Nationality, Immigration and Asylum Act 2002.
R (on the application of Stott) v Secretary of State for Justice	[2018] UKSC 59	28 November	Criminal Justice Act 2003, Article 14 of the European Convention on Human Rights	The extended determinate sentences scheme does not breach Article 14 of the European Convention on Human Rights, read with Article 5. The differing treatment of EDS prisoners in relation to early release is within the scope of Article 14 on the grounds of "other status".
Secretary of State for Justice v MM	[2018] UKSC 60	28 November	Mental Health Act 1983, Article 5 of the European Convention on Human Rights	Where a person is hospitalised on mental health grounds, neither the Secretary of State nor the Mental Health Tribunal are able to impost conditions on discharge which would amount to a deprivation of the patient's liberty.
Volcafe Ltd v Compania Sud Americana De Vapores SA	[2018] UK SC 61	5 December	Shipping Law, Hague Rules	Where cargo was shipped in good condition by was discharged damaged the burden of proof was on the carrier to who that it did not beach it obligations under the Hague Rules to take reasonable care of the goods. Where negligence is to be considered then the burden of proof was on the cargo owner to show that the carrier was negligent.
S Franses Limited v The Cavendish Hotel (London) Ltd	[2018] UKSC 62	5 December	Property Law, Landlord and Tenant Act 1954	A landlord could not oppose the grant of a new tenancy under the provisions of the Landlord and Tenant Act 1954, which allow for new tenancies to be denied on redevelopment grounds, where the works that the landlord intended to carry out have no purpose other than to remove the tenant and would not be done had the tenant left voluntarily.
London Borough of Southwark v Transport for London	[2018] UKSC 63	5 December	Property Law	Where roads had been transferred from individual London borough councils to the Greater London Authority under the GLA Roads and Side Roads (Transfer of Property etc) Order 2000, the effect of the order was to include the entire vertical plane (i.e. all the airspace above and the subsoil below the surface of the road).
The UK Withdrawal From the European Union (Legal Continuity) (Scotland) Bill – A Reference by the Attorney General and the Advocate General for Scotland	[2018] UKSC 64	13 December	Brexit, Constitutional Law	A bill in the Scottish Parliament which had been drafted as an alternative to the EU Withdrawal Bill was (other than in section of one section) within the jurisdiction of the Scottish Parliament. However, subsequent legislation passes by the Parliament of the United Kingdom rendered a further 21 sections invalid.
Williams v The Trustees of Swansea University Pension and Assurance Scheme	[2018] UKSC 65	17 December	Anti-discrimination law Equality Act 2010	An individual with a disability has not suffered any unfavorable treatment where an enhancement to his pension was based on the individual's part-time salary at the time of retirement for ill-health rather than a full-time salary as, when considered overall, his pension terms were more favorable than those of an able bodied person.
Welsh Ministers v PJ	[2018] UKSC 66	17 December	Mental Health Act 1983, Article 5 of the European Convention on Human Rights	Community Treatment Orders under the Mental Health Act 1983 cannot be imposed where effect of the order would have the effect of a deprivation of liberty contrary to article 5 of the European Convention on Human Rights.
UKI (Kingsway) Limited v Westminster City Council	[2018] UKSC 67	17 December	Property Law, Business Rates, Local Government Finance Act 1988	A "completion notice" issued by Westminster City Council which did not identify the property owner, which was left with owner's agents and was subsequently scanned and emailed to the property owner had been validly served. The Electronic Communications Act 2000 allowed for such noticed to be received by email.
