= List of judgments of the Supreme Court of the United Kingdom delivered in 2019 =

This is a list of the judgments given by the Supreme Court of the United Kingdom in the year 2019.

In 2019, Lady Hale of Richmond was the President of the Supreme Court; Lord Reed of Allermuir was the Deputy President.

The table lists judgments made by the court and the opinions of the judges in each case. Judges are treated as having concurred in another's judgment when they either formally attach themselves to the judgment of another or speak only to acknowledge their concurrence with one or more judges. Any judgment which reaches a conclusion which differs from the majority on one or more major points of the appeal has been treated as dissent.

All dates are for 2019 unless expressly stated otherwise.

== 2019 case summaries ==
Unless otherwise noted, cases were heard by a panel of 5 judges.

Cases involving Scots law are highlighted in orange. Cases involving Northern Irish law are highlighted in green.

Case name	Citation	Date	Legal subject	Summary of decision
Reference by the Attorney General for Northern Ireland of devolution issues to the Supreme Court pursuant to Paragraph 34 of Schedule 10 to the Northern Ireland Act 1998 (No 2)	[2019] UKSC 1	14 January	Constitutional law, Devolution in the UK	
R (Hallam) v Secretary of State for Justice and R (Nealon) v Secretary of State for Justice	[2019] UKSC 2	30 January	Criminal law	Applicants were not entitled to compensation under section 133 of the Criminal Justice Act 1988 for criminal convictions which were subsequently quashed for being unsafe.
R (P) v Secretary of State for the Home Department, R (P, G and W) v Secretary of State for the Home Department and Re Lorraine Gallagher for Judicial Review (Northern Ireland)	[2019] UKSC3	30 January	Labour Law, Human rights	Held that the requirement for spent minor criminal convictions to be disclosed to potential employers under the multiple convictions rules is incompatible with Article 8 ECHR
Wells v Devani	[2019] UKSC 4	13 February	Contract Law, Estate Agents Act 1979	A binding contract for the payment of commission had been made between an estate agent and property owner despite the absence of a written contract. Amount of commission reduced as a result of the estate agent breaching Estate Agents Act 1979 s 18 requiring certain terms to be explained to a vendor.
Perry v Raleys Solicitors	[2019] UKSC 5	13 February	Tort law, Professional negligence	In considering whether professional negligence was the cause of a loss where the negligence consisted of a potential lost litigation opportunity it was necessary to consider, on the balance of the probabilities, where such litigation would have been undertaken if non-negligently advised and whether such litigation would have been successful.
Cameron v Liverpool Victoria Insurance Co Ltd	[2019] UKSC 6	20 February	Tort law, insurance law, Road Traffic Act 1988	The Court concluded that a person, who is not just anonymous but cannot be identified, cannot be sued under a pseudonym or description and as such an insurer cannot be held liable for a claim under Part VI of the Road Traffic Act 1988 where the driver of the vehicle involved in the accident cannot be identified.
In the matter of an application by Geraldine Finucane for Judicial Review (Northern Ireland)	[2019] UKSC 7	27 February	Constitutional law, Public inquiry, Article 2 of the ECHR	It was lawful for the government to have refused to hold a public inquiry into the murder of human rights lawyer but the fact that an appropriate inquiry had not taken place breached Article 2 of the European Convention on Human Rights (the right to life).
Konecny v District Court in Brno-Venkov, Czech Republic	[2019] UKSC 8	27 February	Human rights, European Arrest Warrant, Extradition Act 2003, Article 8 of the ECHR	The appeal of an individual against extradition under a European Arrest Warrant was dismissed on the basis that the individual was a convicted person despite having an unequivocal right to a retrial after surrender. The court also dismissed that the passage of time prevented extradition under Article 8 of the European Convention on Human Rights.
In the matter of an application by Hugh Jordan for Judicial Review (Northern Ireland)	[2019] UKSC 9	6 March	Human rights, Human Rights Act 1998 Article 2 of the ECHR	The court allowed an appeal against a stay on the award of damages under the Human Rights Act 1998 s 8 for breach of Article 2 of the ECHR confirming that a claim for damages can run concurrently with an inquest.
KV (Sri Lanka) v Secretary of State for the Home Department	[2019] UKSC 10	6 March	Immigration law, Right of asylum, Istanbul Protocol	An assessment by a medical expert which referred to the consistency of the clinical findings to the statements by the applicant were not beyond the remit of an expert and were in accordance with the Istanbul Protocol. When considering the likelihood that injuries are self inflicted by proxy (SIBP) rather than torture considerable weight should be given to the fact that such injuries which are SIBP are extremely rare.
Robinson (formerly JR (Jamaica)) v Secretary of State for the Home Department	[2019] UKSC 11	13 March	Immigration Law, Nationality, Immigration and Asylum Act 2002	A second human rights claim in an immigration case did automatically trigger a right of appeal once the rights to appeal on an original claim had been exhausted.
HMRC v Joint Administrators of Lehman Brothers International (Europe)	[2019] UKSC 12	13 March 2019	Tax Law	Statutory interest paid under the Insolvency Rules 2016 is considered to be yearly interest and therefore subject to a deduction of tax at source under the provisions of the Income Tax Act 2007
Takhar v Gracefield Developments Limited	[2019] UKSC 13	20 March 2019	Criminal law, Fraud	Where on original judgement has been obtained by reason of the fraudulent conduct of a party and an allegation of fraud has not been raised in the original judgement then it is not necessary for the defrauded party to show that the fraud would have been spotted with reasonable diligence in order for the case to proceed to trial.
SAE Education Ltd v HMRC	[2019] UKSC 14	20 March	Tax Law, VAT, Value Added Tax Act 1994	A commercial provider of university education which did not in itself hold degree awarding powers but collaborated with UK universities to award degrees could be considered to be a "college of a university" for the purpose of exemption from VAT.
Actavis Group PTC EHF v ICOS Corporation	[2019] UKSC 15	27 March	Intellectual property, Patent Law, Patents Act 1977, European Patent Convention	The Court of Appeal was within its powers to interfere with the decision in the High Court in assessing whether dosage testing was obvious and therefore the patent was invalid for lack of an inventive test.
R&S Pilling t/a Phoenix Engineering v UK Insurance Ltd	[2019] UKSC 16	27 March	Tort law, insurance law, Road Traffic Act 1988	An insurer was not liable for a fire occurring on private land arising from the insured vehicle where the vehicle was not, at the time, being used as a means of transportation. The Road Traffic Act 1988 s 143 was incompatible with EU law.
Stocker v Stocker	[2019] UKSC 17	3 April	Tort law, English defamation law, Defamation Act 1952	An allegation that he "tried to strangle me" on Facebook did not constitute defamation even if the person making the allegation could not demonstrate that he has actually intended to kill her. Context should be given to the nature of spontaneous social media posts when interpreting their meaning.
R (Newby Foods Ltd) v Food Standards Agency	[2019] UKSC 18	3 April	EU law, Food Safety	Meat remaining on an animal carcass after it has been mechanically butchered which is subsequently removed from that carcass using a mechanical process was mechanically separated meat under EU law and therefore subject to the specific hygiene requirements of EU regulation no 853/2004.
R (Derry) v Commissioners for Her Majesty's Revenue and Customs	[2019] UKSC 19	10 April	Tax Law, Income Tax Act 2007	HM Revenue & Customs has not followed the correct process into raising an inquiry into a claim for share loss relief by the taxpayer and therefore were out of time to challenge the loss relief claimed by the taxpayer.
Lungowe v Vedanta Resources plc	[2019] UKSC 20	10 April	Company Law, Tort Law, Conflict of laws	A number of Zambian citizens were entitled to be a group action in the UK courts against Vedanta Resources PLC in respect of alleged harm to the health and farming resources arising from the Nchanga Copper Mine which was operated by a Zambian subsidiary of Vedanta Resources (Konkola Copper Mines).
R (DA) v Secretary of State for Work and Pensions, R (DS) v Secretary of State for Work and Pensions	[2019] UKSC 21	15 May	Human rights, Article 14 of the ECHR, Housing Benefit, Welfare Reform Act 2012	The revised lower benefit cap in respect of eligibility for Housing Benefit did not discriminate against lone parents, or lone parents with children under school age, and was therefore considered to be lawful.
R (Privacy International) v Investigatory Powers Tribunal	[2019] UKSC 22	15 May	Constitutional law, Regulation of Investigatory Powers Act 2000	By majority decision the court held decisions of the Investigatory Powers Tribunal could be subject to judicial review in the High Court and implied that parliament may not use legislation to "oust" the jurisdiction of the courts to undertake judicial review.
Telereal Trillium v Hewitt (Valuation Officer)	[2019] UKSC 23	15 May	Tax law, Business rates in England, Valuation	In considering the rateable value of a premises in a saturated market the valuation hypothesis must assume there remains a willing tenant who is interested in renting the building with the amount of such rent being determined by reference to the general demand derived from similar premises.
Hancock v HMRC	[2019] UKSC 24	22 May	Tax Law, Taxation of Chargeable Gains Act 1992	The cash redemption of loan notes were the redemption of qualifying corporate bonds and therefore a gain subject to tax under the provisions of the Taxation of Chargeable Gains Act 1992 was crystallized on the redemption of the bonds.
Poole Borough Council v GN	[2019] UKSC 25	6 June	Tort law, Negligence, Vicarious Liability, Children Act 1989	Poole Borough Council had not breached their duty of care in respect of children placed in local authority housing where the children had been subject to harassment and abuse by neighbours. The court found that X v Bedfordshire CC was no longer good law.
In the matter of an application by Dennis Hutchings for Judicial Review (Northern Ireland)	[2019] UKSC 26	6 June	Constitutional law, Justice and Security (Northern Ireland) Act 2007, non-jury trial	The Director of Public Prosecutions for Northern Ireland was entitled to file a certificate under the Justice and Security (Northern Ireland) Act 2007 for a former British Army soldier to be tried in a Diplock court by a judge alone (without a jury) in respect of a killing made by the soldier during the Troubles
Lachaux v Independent Print Ltd	[2019] UKSC 27	12 June	Tort law, Defamation, Defamation Act 2013	The court ruled that section 1 of the Defamation Act 2013 imposed a new threshold over the common law interpretation of defamation, being that the harm caused had to be serious. It was found that the damage to reputation of the individual in this case did not cause serious harm.
Samuels v Birmingham City Council	[2019] UKSC 28	12 June	Administrative law, Housing Benefit, Housing Act 1996	An individual had not made herself intentionally homeless due to failing to pay her rent since her income had been less than her reasonable living expenses when living in her last settled accommodation.
Sveriges Angfartygs Assurans Forening (The Swedish Club) v Connect Shipping Inc	[2019] UKSC 29	12 June	Tort law, insurance law, Marine Insurance Act 1906	Under the Marine Insurance Act 1906 a ship is a total loss if the costs of repairing the damage exceed the value of the ship. It was held that the costs of repair should include all reasonable costs of salving and safeguarding the ship but would exclude Special Compensation, Protection and Indemnity Clause (SCOPIC) costs.
OWD Ltd t/a Birmingham Cash and Carry v HMRC	[2019] UKSC 30	19 June	Tax Law, Alcohol Duties Liquor Act 1979, Commissioners for Revenue and Customs Act 2005	HMRC does not have the power under the Alcohol Duties Liquor Act 1979 or Commissioners for Revenue and Customs Act 2005 to permit temporary trading in respect of wholesale supplies of alcohol pending an appeal against a refusal to grant approval for such trading under the Alcohol Wholesalers Registration Scheme.
Secretary of State for Work and Pensions v Gubeladze	[2019] UKSC 31	19 June	EU law, Proportionality, Immigration (European Economic Area) Regulations 2006, Citizens' Rights Directive	An individual was entitled to Pension Credit despite having not been registered for three years under the United Kingdom EU Worker Registration Scheme and that the extension to the registration scheme in 2008 was not proportionate as they only gave small and speculative benefits but could have substantial and series effects on individuals.
Tillman v Egon Zehnder Ltd	[2019] UKSC 32	3 July	Labour law, Contract law, Restrictive covenants,	A restrictive covenant in an employment contract which prevented the employee from holding any shareholding (of any size) in a competitor following cessation of employment was too broad and was therefore unenforceable. This part of the clause was required to be severed from the covenants.
London Borough of Lambeth v Secretary of State for Housing, Communities and Local Government	[2019] UKSC 33	3 July	Land law, Planning Law, Town and Country Planning Act 1990	Where planning permission had been granted for retail development subject to restrictions and a subsequent application was made to modify or remove an existing restriction then, even if the subsequent planning permission does not include specific restrictions, this does not necessarily mean there are no restrictions.
Secretary of State for Work and Pensions v MM	[2019] UKSC 34	18 July	Administrative law, Welfare Reform Act 2012, Social Security (Personal Independence Payment) Regulations 2013	A benefit claimed was entitled to claim personal independence payment partly on the basis that they needed support to engage with other people because of mental health problems. The government's narrow and technical view of the scope of the regulations was rejected.
Secretary of State for the Home Department v Franco Vomero (Italy)	[2019] UKSC 35	24 July	EU law, Citizens' Rights Directive, Immigration (European Economic Area) Regulations 2006	An individual had not acquire a right of permanent residence and was prevented from acquiring such a right following the adoption of the Citizens' Rights Directive by virtue of serious criminal convictions. (Following referral of questions to the European Court of Justice).
R (Association of Independent Meat Suppliers) v Food Standards Agency	[2019] UKSC 36	24 July	EU law, Food Safety, Food Safety Act 1990, Food Safety and Hygiene (England) Regulations 2013	The court made no decision and referred two questions to the Court of Justice of the European Union being a) Do EU regulations (Nos 854/2004 and 882/2004 preclude certain procedures undertaken pursuant to the Food Safety Act 1990, and b) Whether EU regulation 882/2004 mandates a right of appeal against decisions of Official Veterinarians.
X v Kuoni Travel Ltd	[2019] UKSC 37	24 July	Contract Law, Package Travel, Package Holidays and Package Tours Regulations 1992	In respect of whether a tour operator was liable for damages for a breach of contract where a hotel guest was sexually assaulted the court referred the questions to the Court of Justice of the European Union on the Package Holiday Directive 90/314/EEC.
Cape Intermediate Holdings Ltd v Dring (for and on behalf of Asbestos Victims Support Groups Forum UK)	[2019] UKSC 38	29 July	Administrative law, Civil Procedure Rules	A person who is not a party to court proceedings may obtain a number of documents that are held in count during proceedings but does not necessarily have a right to every document. The constitutional principle of open justice may require access to be given to further documents than those that are permitted by right under the Civil Procedure Rules.
Commissioners for Her Majesty's Revenue and Customs v Frank A Smart & Son Ltd	[2019] UKSC 39	29 July	Tax law, Value Added Tax	The taxpayer was entitled to recover input VAT under the Principal VAT Directive on costs incurred in respect of the purchase of single farm payment entitlements with the key testing on whether recovery was available being how the subsidy was to be used by the business.
Akçilv Koza Ltd	[2019] UKSC 40	29 July	Company law, Conflict of laws, Legal Jurisdiction, Brussels I Recast Regulation	The English courts did not have jurisdiction in respect of a claim brought by trustee shareholders of Koza Altın (a Turkish company) over changes made to the constitutional documents of a UK subsidiary. Whether the Turkish parent had acted validly was a matter for the Turkish Courts.
R (Miller) v The Prime Minister and Cherry v Advocate General for Scotland	[2019] UKSC 41	24 September	Constitutional law	The Prime Minister's advice to Her Majesty to exercise the prerogative power to prorogue Parliament was unlawful as it prevented Parliament from exercising its constitutional functions, and the resulting prorogation was thus void and of no effect. Decided by 11 judges.
In the matter of D (A Child)	[2019] UKSC 42	26 September	Constitutional law, Liberty, Children Act 1989, Article 5 of the ECHR, Article 8 of the ECHR	Where a 16 or 17 year old lacks capacity to give their own consent, it is not possible for the parents of the individual to give consent to living arrangements which would amount to a deprivation of liberty. Instead an application must be made under the Deprivation of Liberty Safeguards regime.
Routier v HMRC	[2019] UKSC 43	16 October	Tax law, Inheritance Tax Act 1984	The restriction in the Inheritance Tax Act 1984 for exemptions of legacies to charities to UK charities violated the EU law principle of the freedom of movement of capital.
Gilham v Ministry of Justice	[2019] UKSC 44	16 October	Labour law, Employment Rights Act 1996, Article 10, ECHR, Article 14, ECHR	A district judge was entitled to whistleblower protections by virtue of being a 'worker' despite not being an employee under the Employment Rights Act 1996. Failure to offer such protection would interfere with the right to freedom of expression, protected under Article 10, ECHR.
Shanks v Unilever Plc	[2019] UKSC 45	23 October	Intellectual property, Patent Law, Patents Act 1977	The system for measuring glucose concentration by an employee of Unilever had provided an outstanding benefit to the company and the employee was entitled to a fair share of that benefit.
The Manchester Ship Canal Company Ltd v Vauxhall Motors Ltd (Formerly General Motors UK Ltd)	[2019] UKSC 46	23 October	Land law, Equitable Relief from Forfeiture	Relief from forfeiture can be given in respect of possessory rights over land where the contract grants either proprietary or possessory rights over land and the termination provision was included in the contract as security of the payment of a sum.
Sequent Nominees Ltd v Hautford Ltd	[2019] UKSC 47	30 October	Land law, Leasehold Reform Act 1967	A landlord had not unreasonably refused consent for a tenant to apply for planning permission where refusing to grant such consent was an additional safeguard to protect the landlord against the risk of enfranchisement under the Leasehold Reform Act 1967
Travelers Insurance Company Ltd v XYZ	[2019] UKSC 48	30 October	Administrative law, costs in English law, insurance law, Senior Courts Act 1981	An insurance company which was not a party to the original case but was the insurer of one of the parties was not liable for costs under section 51 of the Senior Courts Act 1981 where it did not engage in 'unjustified intermeddling'.
In the matter of NY (A Child)	[2019] UKSC 49	30 October	Hague Convention on the Civil Aspects of International Child Abduction, Child Abduction and Custody Act 1985	An appeal under the Hague Convention on the Civil Aspects of International Child Abduction by the Court of Appeal of England and Wales was set aside.
Singularis Holdings Ltd (In Official Liquidation) (A Company Incorporated in the Cayman Islands) v Daiwa Capital Markets Europe Ltd	[2019] UKSC 50	30 October	Tort law, Duty of Care, Law Reform (Contributory Negligence) Act 1945	A bank which executes a fraudulent instruction to transfer funds out of a company's account can be held as liable for a breach of its duty of care even if the instruction to transfer the money was made by the controlling shareholders and directors of the company.
R v Reeves Taylor	[2019] UKSC 51	13 November	Criminal Law, Criminal Procedure and Investigations Act 1996, Criminal Appeal Act 1968	In order for a person to be guilty of torture under section 134 of the Criminal Justice Act 1988 the defendant must be acting in an official capacity for a regime or government and the regime must have some kind of control over the area in which the alleged crime took place.
RR v Secretary of State for Work and Pensions	[2019] UKSC 52	13 November	Human rights, Housing Benefit, Housing Benefit Regulations 2006, Housing Benefit and Universal Credit (Size Criteria) (Miscellaneous Amendments) Regulations 2017	Housing benefit should be calculated without deduction of the 'bedroom tax'. Following R (Carmichael) v Secretary of State for Work and Pensions, making such a deduction would be incompatible with Article 14 of the ECHR and a public authority would be required to disregard a legislative provision where its application would result in a breach of the convention.
R (Wright) v Resilient Energy Severndale Ltd and Forest of Dean District Council	[2019] UKSC 53	20 November	Land law, Planning Law, Town and Country Planning Act 1990, Planning and Compulsory Purchase Act 2004	Local authorities must expressly satisfy the Newbury Principles when granting planning permission. In order for consideration to be 'material' it must be for a planning purpose and not an ulterior purpose and be both fair and reasonable in relation to the development. Upholds the wider principle that planning permission cannot be bought or sold.
Edwards on behalf of the Estate of the late Thomas Arthur Watkins v Hugh James Ford Simey Solicitors	[2019] UKSC 54	20 November	Tort law, Professional Negligence	The Bwllfa principle was not relevant to the after date evidence that had been provided to the court and the case was remitted back to the lower courts to determine the value of the loss of opportunity.
Royal Mail Group Ltd v Jhuti	[2019] UKSC 55	27 November	Labour law, Employment Rights Act 1996, Whistleblowing	If an employee is dismissed by virtue of a false reason given to the person responsible for making the dismissal then, even if the person responsible has a genuine belief in the false reason, then the actual reason for dismissal is in face the hidden reason that was not disclosed to the decision maker.
R (Hemmati) v Secretary of State for the Home Department	[2019] UKSC 56	27 November	Immigration law, Illegal immigration, Right of asylum	The policy to detain persons who had sought asylum in another EU State where the claims were referred to an EU State under the Dublin III Regulation under the Immigration Act 1971 failed to comply with the Dublin III Regulation as it lacked adequate certainty and predictability.
MacDonald v Carnbroe Estates Ltd	[2019] UKSC 57	4 December	Insolvency law, Gratuitous alienations on insolvency, Insolvency Act 1986	Where a property had been sold for £550,000 but only £470,000 had been paid and a higher price could have been achieved with a proper marketing process then there had been a gratuitous alienation prior to insolvency. In considering the available remedy, a flexible approach can be taken to take account of the consideration which a bona fide purchaser would have paid.
R (Lancashire County Council) v Secretary of State for the Environment, Food and Rural Affairs, R (NHS Property Services Ltd) v Surrey County Council	[2019] UKSC 58	11 December	Land law, Statutory Incompatibility	The specific public interest contained in the statutory purpose for which the land was actually held outweighed the public interest in registering the land as a town or village green under the Commons Act 2006.
Patel v Secretary of State for the Home Department, Secretary of State for the Home Department v Shah	[2019] UKSC 59	16 December	Immigration Law, Immigration (European Economic Area) Regulations 2006, TFEU, Charter of Fundamental Rights of the EU	The Zambrano principle applied to allow a parent of a dependent child who was a resident to a non EU member state to reside in the UK as the primary carer of a British citizen but did not provide the same rights for another individual in respect of their elderly parent as there was not a 'relationship of dependency'.
Miller v Ministry of Justice	[2019] UKSC 60	16 December	Labour law, Part-time Work Directive 1997, Part-time Workers (Prevention of Less Favourable Treatment) Regulations 2000	Judges who had held one or more appointments as fee-paid part-time judges had been subject to less favourable treatment in respect of the provision of a pension and were entitled to pensions in respect of their former part-time service.
