= List of judgments of the Supreme Court of the United Kingdom delivered in 2023 =

This is a list of the judgments given by the Supreme Court of the United Kingdom in the year 2023.

In 2023, Lord Reed of Allermuir was the President of the Supreme Court; Lord Hodge was the Deputy President.

The table lists judgments made by the court and the opinions of the judges in each case. Judges are treated as having concurred in another's judgment when they either formally attach themselves to the judgment of another or speak only to acknowledge their concurrence with one or more judges. Any judgment which reaches a conclusion which differs from the majority on one or more major points of the appeal has been treated as dissent.

All dates are for 2023 unless expressly stated otherwise.

== 2023 case summaries ==
Unless otherwise noted, cases were heard by a panel of 5 judges.

Cases involving Scots law are highlighted in orange. Cases involving Northern Irish law are highlighted in green.

Case name	Citation	Date	Legal subject	Summary of decision
Trustees of the Barry Congregation of Jehovah's Witnesses v BXB	[2023] UKSC 15	26 April 2023	Tort law, Vicarious liability	The two-stage test for vicarious liability applies equally to cases of sexual abuse. Merely satisfying the 'but-for' test does not suffice to fulfill the second stage, which is the close connection test. In complex cases, it can be helpful to assess whether the outcome aligns with the underlying policy to ensure justice is served.
Jalla & Anor v Shell International Trading and Shipping Co Ltd & Anor	[2023] UKSC 16	10 May 2023	Tort law, Private nuisance, Limitation periods	A one-off event, such as an oil spill or a flood, does not qualify as a continuing private nuisance unless it involves repeated activity by the defendant or an ongoing condition for which the defendant is responsible, causing non-stop interference with the use and enjoyment of the claimant's land. The limitation period for filing a claim does not reset daily merely because the effects of the event persist.
Wolverhampton City Council v London Gypsies and Travellers	[2023] UKSC 47	29 November 2023		
