= List of judgments of the Supreme Court of the United Kingdom delivered in 2017 =

This is a list of the judgments given by the Supreme Court of the United Kingdom in the year 2017. 5 cases have been decided as of 25 January 2017 and these are ordered by neutral citation.

In 2017, Lord Neuberger of Abbotsbury was the President of the Supreme Court; Lady Hale of Richmond was the Deputy President.

The table lists judgments made by the court and the opinions of the judges in each case. Judges are treated as having concurred in another's judgment when they either formally attach themselves to the judgment of another or speak only to acknowledge their concurrence with one or more judges. Any judgment which reaches a conclusion which differs from the majority on one or more major points of the appeal has been treated as dissent.

All dates are for 2017 unless expressly stated otherwise.

== 2017 case summaries ==
Case name	Citation	Date	Legal subject	Summary of decision
Rahmatullah (No 2) v Ministry of Defence	[2017] UKSC 1	17 January	Crown Proceedings Act 1947	
Abd Ali Hameed Al-Waheed v Ministry of Defence	[2017] UKSC 2	17 January	Constitutional law	Detention
Belhaj v Straw	[2017] UKSC 3	17 January	International law	Act of state doctrine
FirstGroup Plc v Paulley	[2017] UKSC 4	18 January	Discrimination law	A bus company's duty to provide wheelchair space under the Equality Act 2010.
R (Miller) v Secretary of State for Exiting the European Union	[2017] UKSC 5	24 January	Constitutional law	An Act of Parliament, not the Royal Prerogative, was required to send notification under TEU article 50 to negotiate leaving the EU because this would withdraw rights under Acts of Parliament. Decided by 11 judges.
Akers v Samba Financial Group	[2017] UKSC 6	1 February	Conflict of laws	Extinguishing of an equitable interest by transferring legal title to a bona fide purchase for value was not a "disposition" of that equitable interest for the purposes of avoidance under the Insolvency Act 1986.
DB v Chief Constable of Police Service of Northern Ireland	[2017] UKSC 7	1 February	Constitutional law	Bans on processions in Northern Ireland and ECHR article 11.
Re Brewster	[2017] UKSC 8	8 February		
R (Hicks) v Commissioner of Police for the Metropolis	[2017] UKSC 9	15 February	Constitutional law	
R (MM (Lebanon)) v Secretary of State	[2017] UKSC 10	22 February		
R (Agyarko and Ikuga) v Secretary of State for the Home Department	[2017] UKSC 11	22 February		
Homes and Communities Agency v JS Bloor (Wilmslow) Ltd	[2017] UKSC 12	22 February		
AMT Futures Ltd v Marzillier	[2017] UKSC 13	1 March		
Newbigin (Valuation Officer) v SJ & J Monk	[2017] UKSC 14	1 March		
EV (A Child), Re (Scotland)	[2017] UKSC 15	1 March		
IPCO (Nigeria) Ltd v Nigerian National Petroleum Corporation	[2017] UKSC 16	1 March		
Ilott v The Blue Cross	[2017] UKSC 17	15 March		
AIG Europe Ltd v Woodman	[2017] UKSC 18	22 March		
Financial Conduct Authority v Macris	[2017] UKSC 19	22 March		
Gordon v Scottish Criminal Cases Review Commission (Scotland)	[2017] UKSC 20	22 March		
BPE Solicitors v Hughes-Holland	[2017] UKSC 21	22 March		
N v ACCG	[2017] UKSC 22	22 March		
Plevin v Paragon Personal Finance Ltd	[2017] UKSC 23	29 March		
Wood v Capita Insurance Services Ltd	[2017] UKSC 24	29 March		
AB v Her Majesty's Advocate	[2017] UKSC 25	5 April		
Volkswagen Financial Services (UK) Ltd v Revenue and Customs	[2017] UKSC 26	5 April		
Essop v Home Office (UK Border Agency)	[2017] UKSC 27	5 April	Labour law	A skills test was indirect discrimination, and claimants need not prove why if there is in fact a disparate impact.
Isle of Wight Council v Platt	[2017] UKSC 28	6 April		
Revenue and Customs v The Investment Trust Companies	[2017] UKSC 29	11 April		
SXH v The Crown Prosecution Service	[2017] UKSC 30	11 April		
McCann v The State Hospitals Board for Scotland	[2017] UKSC 31	11 April		
Lowick Rose LLP v Swynson Ltd	[2017] UKSC 32	11 April		
Times Newspapers Ltd v Flood	[2017] UKSC 33	11 April		
Nuclear Decommissioning Authority v EnergySolutions EU Ltd	[2017] UKSC 34	11 April		
Gard Marine and Energy Ltd v China National Chartering Company Ltd	[2017] UKSC 35	10 May		
Poshteh v Royal Borough of Kensington and Chelsea	[2017] UKSC 36	10 May		
Suffolk Coastal District Council v Hopkins Homes Ltd	[2017] UKSC 37	10 May		
LB Holdings Intermediate 2 Ltd v Lehman Brothers International (Europe)	[2017] UKSC 38	17 May	Insolvency law	
Hartley v King Edward VI College	[2017] UKSC 39	24 May	Labour law	Wage deductions from striking teachers were unlawful by exceeding the proportion of time on strike.
R (Coll) v Secretary of State for Justice	[2017] UKSC 40	24 May		
R (A and B) v Secretary of State for Health	[2017] UKSC 41	14 June		
R (Kiarie and Byndloss) v Secretary of State for the Home Department	[2017] UKSC 42	14 June		
Globalia Business Travel SAU of Spain v Fulton Shipping Inc of Panama	[2017] UKSC 43	28 June		
Lord Advocate v Dean	[2017] UKSC 44	28 June		
RFC 2012 Plc v Advocate General for Scotland	[2017] UKSC 45	5 July		
O'Brien v Ministry of Justice	[2017] UKSC 46	12 July		
Walker v Innospec Ltd	[2017] UKSC 47	12 July		
Eli Lilly v Actavis UK Ltd	[2017] UKSC 48	12 July		
PNM v Times Newspapers Ltd &	[2017] UKSC 49	19 July		
R (Hemming (t/a Simply Pleasure)) v Westminster City Council	[2017] UKSC 50	19 July		
R (UNISON) v Lord Chancellor	[2017] UKSC 51	26 July	Constitutional law, Labour law	The Lord Chancellor's Order imposing £1200 fees to bring Employment Tribunal claims violated the rule of law.
McDonald v Newton or McDonald	[2017] UKSC 52	26 July		
Birch v Birch	[2017] UKSC 53	26 July		
Sadovska v Secretary of State for the Home Department	[2017] UKSC 54	26 July		
BPP Holdings Ltd v Revenue and Customs	[2017] UKSC 55	26 July		
R (Forge Care Homes Ltd) v Cardiff and Vale University Health Board	[2017] UKSC 56	2 August		
Goldtrail Travel Ltd v Onur Air Tasimacilik AS	[2017] UKSC 57	2 August		
R v M	[2017] UKSC 58	3 August		
MT Hojgaard AS v EON Climate and Renewables UK Robin Rigg East Ltd	[2017] UKSC 59	3 August		
Armes v Nottinghamshire County Council	[2017] UKSC 60	18 October		
Reyes v Al-Malki	[2017] UKSC 61	18 October		
Benkharbouche v Secretary of State for Foreign and Commonwealth Affairs	[2017] UKSC 62	18 October	Labour law, International law	There was no state immunity for breach of employment rights.
Re Loughlin	[2017] UKSC 63	18 October		
Taurus Petroleum Limited v State Oil Marketing Company of the Ministry of Oil, Republic of Iraq	[2017] UKSC 64	25 October		
P v Commissioner of Police of the Metropolis	[2017] UKSC 65	25 October		
Aberdeen City and Shire Strategic Development Planning Authority v Elsick Development Company Limited	[2017] UKSC 66	25 October		
Ivey v Genting Casinos (UK) Ltd	[2017] UKSC 67	25 October	Criminal law	The test for fraud is objective.
Mitsui & Co Ltd v Beteiligungsgesellschaft LPG Tankerflotte MBH & Co KG	[2017] UKSC 68	25 October		
Brown v The Parole Board for Scotland	[2017] UKSC 69	1 November	Article 5 of the European Convention on Human Rights, Human Rights Act 1998	The duty to afford prisoners a real opportunity for rehabilitation extends beyond those subject to life sentences and includes prisoners serving the extended part of an extended sentence.
Littlewoods Ltd v Commissioners for Her Majesty's Revenue and Customs	[2017] UKSC 70	1 November	Tax Law	Littlewoods were not entitled on common law grounds to receive compound interest from HMRC on overpaid VAT. The terms of the Value Added Tax Act 1994 exclude common law restitution claims and compound interest and these provisions were not contrary to EU law.
Michalak v General Medical Council	[2017] UKSC 71	1 November	Judicial Review, Equality Act 2010	A judicial review of conduct relating to a decision by the General Medical Council does not constitute 'proceedings in the nature of appeal' but is instead 'proceedings in which the legality of any decision, to the procedure by which it is reached, is challenge'. As a result, claimants complaining of unlawful discrimination by a qualification body can take the complaint to the Employment Tribunal in all cases unless there is a specific alternative right of appeal.
R (C) v Secretary of State for Work and Pensions	[2017] UKSC 72	1 November	Gender Inequality, Gender Recognition Act 2004, Human Rights Act 1998, Equality Act 2010	Policies in the administration the welfare benefits system which retained the birth gender of a person within a person's records were not unlawful in their application to people of reassigned gender.
R (HC) v Secretary of State for Work and Pensions	[2017] UKSC 73	15 November	Immigration Law	Regulations introduced to exclude persons from eligibility to social security benefits who qualified to reside in the UK solely as a result of the ruling in Ruiz Zambrano v Office national de l'emploi were not incompatible with the EU Charter of Fundamental Rights or Article 14 of the European Convention on Human Rights.
R (De Silva) v HM Revenue and Customs	[2017] UKSC 74	15 November	Tax Law, Taxes Management Act 1970	Enquiries made by HMRC into elections made by members of a film partnership, in respect of the utilisation of losses made by that partnership, were valid where the enquiry was made into the partnership return rather than specifically into the claims made by the individuals.
Gordon v Campbell Riddell Breeze Paterson LLP	[2017] UKSC 75	15 November	Professional negligence, Prescription and Limitation (Scotland) Act 1973	The five year time limits in the Prescription and Limitation (Scotland) Act 1973 meant that a claim involving a professional negligence action against a firm of solicitors could only be made for up to five years from the date on which the client incurred the loss, even if the party did not know that they will have a claim during that period.
Scotch Whisky Association & Ors v The Lord Advocate	[2017] UKSC 76	15 November	The Alcohol (Minimum Pricing) (Scotland) Act 2012, Treaty on the Functioning of the European Union	The Scottish government minimum pricing legislation on alcohol was legal and did not conflict with the requirements for 'open and un-distorted competition' guaranteed by the EU free movement principles.
Tiuta International Ltd (in liquidation) v De Villiers Surveyors Ltd	[2017] UKSC 77	29 November	Professional negligence in English law	Where a lender had made a loan to a property developer based on a valuation from a property surveyor which replaced an existing loan made by the same lender, which was based on a previous valuation (for which not claim for negligence was made), then the loss to the lender arising from the second valuation was limited to the additional monies lent under the second loan rather than the whole of the value of the second loan.
O'Connor v Bar Standards Board	[2017] UKSC 78	6 December	Human Rights Human Rights Act 1998	A barrister who had been charged by the Bar Standards Board for professional misconduct and who had challenged the charge as being a breach of rights under the European Convention on Human Rights was not out of time to make such a challenge. The 12 month time period for making such a claim where there was a continuous course of conduct could start from the end of that continuous period.
Dover District Council v CPRE Kent	[2017] UKSC 79	6 December	Planning permission in the United Kingdom, The Town and Country Planning Act 1990	Where a local planning authority had granted permission against the advice of its own professional advisers it had a common law duty to provide reasons for the decision. Such a duty also existed in statute under the Town and County Planning (Environmental Impact Assessment) Regulations 2011.
Four Seasons Holdings Incorporated v Brownlie	[2017] UKSC 80	19 December	Tort law	The term "damage" should be given its ordinary and natural meaning in considering whether the civil procedure rules allow for proceedings to be brought in the English courts where 'damage was, or will be sustained, within the jurisdiction'. Therefore, an indirect loss suffered in England as a result of a tort committed abroad may be sufficient to establish the English court's jurisdiction to hear the claim.
R (Black) v Secretary of State for Justice	[2017] UKSC 81	19 December	Smoking ban in England	The Crown, in respect of the operations of Her Majesty's Prison Service is not bound by the provisions of the smoking ban in England as express provision to bind the Crown as not made in the Health Act 2006.
R (Hysaj) v Secretary of State for the Home Department	[2017] UKSC 82	21 December	British nationality law, British Nationality Act 1981	Misrepresentations made in applications for citizenship render the applicant to be liable to be deprived of citizenship. However, the concept of nullity only applies where a person applies for citizenship by impersonating another real person and does not apply in other cases were a person adopted a false identity. Persons note impersonating another real person will therefore be entitled to the full appeals process.

== 2017 opinions ==
Delivered a judgment (majority)	Concurred in the judgment of another justice (majority)	Delivered a judgment (dissenting)	Concurred in the judgment of another justice (dissent)	Did not participate in the decision

Case name	Citation	Argued	Decided	Neuberger of Abbotsbury	Hale of Richmond	Mance	Kerr of Tonaghmore	Clarke of Stone-cum-Ebony	Wilson of Culworth	Sumption	Reed	Carnwath of Notting Hill	Hughes of Ombersley	Hodge
Rahmatullah (No 2) v Ministry of Defence	[2017] UKSC 1	9–10 May 2016	17 January
Abd Ali Hameed Al-Waheed v Ministry of Defence	[2017] UKSC 2	1–4 February 2016; 26 October 2016	17 January
Belhaj v Straw	[2017] UKSC 3	9–12 November 2015	17 January
FirstGroup Plc v Paulley	[2017] UKSC 4	15 June 2016	18 January
R (Miller) v Secretary of State for Exiting the European Union	[2017] UKSC 5	5–8 December 2016	24 January
Akers v Samba Financial Group	[2017] UKSC 6	27–28 April 2016	1 February 2017
DB v Chief Constable of Police Service of Northern Ireland	[2017] UKSC 7	15 November 2016	1 February 2017
In the matter of an application by Denise Brewster for Judicial Review	[2017] UKSC 8	24 November 2016	8 February 2017
R (Hicks) v Commissioner of Police for the Metropolis	[2017] UKSC 9	28–29 June 2016	15 February 2017
R (MM) v Secretary of State for the Home Department	[2017] UKSC 10	22–24 February 2016	22 February 2017
R (Agyarko) v Secretary of State for the Home Department	[2017] UKSC 11	6–7 April 2016	22 February 2017
Homes and Communities Agency v J S Bloor (Wilmslow) Ltd	[2017] UKSC 12	12 January 2017	22 February 2017
Isle of Wight Council v Platt	[2017] UKSC 28	31 January 2017	6 April 2017
R (UNISON) v Lord Chancellor	[2017] UKSC 51	27–28 March 2017	26 July 2017
