= Sivsivadze v Minister for Justice =

- Coat of arms of Ireland
- Court: Supreme Court of Ireland
- Full case name: Sivsivadze & ors (Appellants) v Minister for Justice and Equality & ors (Respondents)
- Decided: 23 June 2015
- Citations: [2015] IESC 53 ; [2015] 2 ILRM 73; [2016] 2 IR 403
- Transcript: https://www.bailii.org/ie/cases/IESC/2015/S53.html

Case history
- Appealed from: Sivsivadze and Others v Minister for Justice and Equality, Ireland and Attorney General (No 1) [2012] IEHC 137, [2012] IEHC 244

Court membership
- Judges sitting: Murray J, Hardiman J, O'Donnell Donal J, Clarke J, MacMenamin J

Case opinions
- A deportation order is an executive decision within the powers of the State, exercised by the Minister, as authorised by statute, to deny an unlawful alien with no permission to remain in the State from seeking to do so. A deportation order is not a punishment or administrative sanction, notwithstanding that a prosecution could be brought for a breach of the order.
- Decision by: Murray J
- Concurrence: Hardiman J, O'Donnell Donal J, Clarke J, MacMenamin J

Keywords
- Asylum; Deportation; Immigration

Sivsivadze v Minister for Justice [2015] IESC 53; [2015] 2 ILRM 73; [2016] 2 IR 403 was an Irish Supreme Court case in which the Supreme Court dismissed a challenge to the constitutionality of section 3(1) of the Immigration Act 1999 (the "1999 Act"), under which the Minister for Justice order the deportation of a non-national (without permission to remain in the State) for an indefinite period.

== Background ==
The appellants were a Georgian couple, who met in Ireland, and were married in 2009. They had two children (also named as appellants), neither of whom were Irish citizens. Ms Sivsivadze, at the time of the hearing, had been granted leave by the Minister for Justice to remain in Ireland, temporarily, on humanitarian grounds. During the course of the hearing, Ms Sivsivadze admitted that she had concocted a false story in order to obtain her permission to remain in Ireland. Her husband, Davit Arabuli, had arrived in Ireland in 2001. In December 2001, the Minister made an order for Mr Arabuli's deportation under s3(1) of the 1999 Act, but "through various deceptive means Aribuli avoided deportation until November 2011." The appeal to the Supreme Court focused on s 3(1) of the 1999 Act, under which the Minister for Justice can order the deportation of a non-national (who has no permission to remain in the State) for an indefinite period. The appellants had already unsuccessfully challenged the constitutionality of this section and s3(11) of the 1999 Act in the High Court, and had been refused a declaration that s3(1) and s3(11) of the 1999 Act were incompatible with Ireland's obligations under the European Convention of Human Rights ("ECHR"). S3(11) permits the Minister to amend or revoke a deportation order.

== Holding of the Supreme Court ==
The Supreme Court judgment was delivered by Murray J. The appellants argued that s3(1) of the 1999 Act was unconstitutional in that, as a deportation order under it was for an indefinite period, this amounted to a disproportionate interference with the rights of the family under the Irish Constitution. The appellants also argued that s3(11) of the 1999 Act was incompatible with Article 15 of the Irish Constitution, in that it permitted an unlawful delegation of legislative powers to the Minister, in the absence of a sufficient statement of principles and policies in the legislation governing how the Minister should exercise his power to make a deportation order. Alternatively, the appellant's argued (on the same grounds) that their family rights under Article 8 of the ECHR were breached by the provisions of the 1999 Act.

=== The Constitutional Arguments ===
The Supreme Court noted that the constitutional challenge focused "on the potentially disproportionate impact which allegedly an indefinite and perhaps lifelong deportation order may have on the family life of a person who will, as a result of deportation, be separated from a spouse and children lawfully resident in this country". However, the Court noted that a deportation order under s3(1) of the 1999 Act is not necessarily unlimited in time, as the Minister can, under s3(11) of the 1999 Act, amend or revoke the order. The Court held that the Minister, in exercising the discretion to make an order under s3(1) of the 1999 Act, or to amend or revoke an order under s3(11) of the 1999 Act, must do so in line with the principles of proportionality and fair procedures, and in accordance with his obligations under the Constitution and the ECHR. The effect of a deportation order made in respect of a person who has no legal right to enter or remain in the State is to put that person in the same position as all other non-nationals who must seek permission from the Minister to enter the State. Such non-nationals do not acquire rights to enter or remain in the State simply due to the passage of time, so it would be "incongruous" for a deportation order to define a period of time within which the obligation to remain outside the State would end.

The Supreme also rejected the argument that s3(11) of the 1999 Act amounted to an unconstitutional delegation of legislative powers to the Minister. Murray J held that the power of the State to exclude non-nationals or aliens from the entering the territory of Ireland is not a power that originates in statute, but "is a power inherent in a sovereign state"; he held that "what the Act of 1999 does, in effect, is to designate the Minister as being the person who makes the decision whether to make or revoke a deportation order". Murray J cited the decision of Fennelly J, who considered s3(11) of the 1999 Act in Cirpaci (nee McCormack) & anor -v- The Minister for Justice, Equality & Law Reform:

On its face, this provision confers a broad discretion, to be exercised in accordance with general principles of law, interpreted in the light of the Constitution and in accordance with fair procedures.

Murray J concluded that the exercise of the power under s3(11) of the 1999 Act involves the exercise of a margin of appreciation related to the facts of individual cases, and that the discretion was clearly left by the Oireachtas to the Minister.

=== The ECHR Arguments ===
The Court applied the same logic to the ECHR arguments, noting that there was nothing in the relevant sections that would restrict the Minister, when making a decision, from "fully taking into account the Article 8 rights of the family directly affected by a deportation order or a refusal to revoke one, in accordance with the principles laid down in the European Convention."

=== Conclusion ===
The Supreme Court dismissed the appeal.
