= Jerusalem v. Austria =

2001 European Court of Human Rights case

Jerusalem v. Austria (26958/95) was a 2001 European Court of Human Rights case.

== Context ==
Mrs Susanne Jerusalem was a member of the Vienna Municipal Council (Gemeinderat), which also acts as the Regional Parliament (Landtag). She was prohibited from repeating the following statements made in the course of a session of the Council: "Like everyone else, I know that today a sect no longer means a small group that breaks away from a big church ..., but a psycho-sect. These psycho-sects also exist in Vienna. They have common features. One aspect they have in common is their totalitarian character. Moreover, in their ideology, they show fascist tendencies and often have hierarchical structures. In general, a person who gets involved with such a sect loses his identity and submits to the group (..) the sect IPM, which has not long been in existence in Austria but which has existed for several years in Switzerland, where it is called the VPM, has had a certain influence on the drugs policy of the Austrian People’s Party".

Austrian Supreme Court considered the statements such as “fascist tendencies” or “totalitarian character” to be statements of fact which Mrs Jerusalem had failed to prove.

== Judgment ==
The European Court of Human Rights noted that "the IPM and the VPM were associations active in a field of public concern, namely drug policy. They participated in public discussions on this matter and, as the Government conceded, cooperated with a political party. Since the associations were active in this manner in the public domain, they ought to have shown a higher degree of tolerance to criticism". Besides, it found that "the impugned statements in the present case, reflecting as they did fair comment on matters of public interest by an elected member of the Municipal Council, are to be regarded as value judgments rather than statements of fact".

After a conclusion that "in requiring the applicant to prove the truth of her statements, while at the same time depriving her of an effective opportunity to adduce evidence to support her statements and thereby show that they constituted fair comment, the Austrian courts overstepped their margin of appreciation and that the injunction granted against the applicant amounted to a disproportionate interference with her freedom of expression", the Court found Article 10 of the European Convention on Human Rights to be violated.

== Literature ==
Harris, O'Boyle, Warbrick Law of the European Convention on Human Rights. New York: Oxford University Press, 2014. ISBN 978-0-19-960639-9 pp. 699–700
