= List of judgments of the Supreme Court of the United Kingdom delivered in 2026 =

This is a list of the judgments given by the Supreme Court of the United Kingdom in the year 2026.

In 2026, Lord Reed of Allermuir is the president of the Supreme Court; Lord Sales is the deputy president.

The table lists judgments made by the court and the opinions of the judges in each case. Judges are treated as having concurred in another's judgment when they either formally attach themselves to the judgment of another or speak only to acknowledge their concurrence with one or more judges. Any judgment which reaches a conclusion which differs from the majority on one or more major points of the appeal has been treated as dissent.

All dates are for 2026 unless expressly stated otherwise.

== 2026 case summaries ==
Unless otherwise noted, cases were heard by a panel of five judges.

Cases involving Scots law are highlighted in orange. Cases involving Northern Irish law are highlighted in green.

Case name	Citation	Date	Legal subject	Summary of decision
Providence Building Services Limited v Hexagon Housing Association Limited	[2026] UKSC 1	15 January 2026	Contract law, Joint Contracts Tribunal	
Lewis-Ranwell v G4S Health Services (UK) Ltd	[2026] UKSC 2	21 January 2026	Illegality, Insanity	
Emotional Perception AI Limited v Comptroller General of Patents, Designs and Trade Marks	[2026] UKSC 3	11 February 2026	Patents and artificial intelligence	
Dairy UK Ltd v Oatly AB	[2026] UKSC 4	11 February 2026	Trade marks	
CCC v Sheffield Teaching Hospitals NHS Foundation Trust	[2026] UKSC 5	11 February 2026	Professional negligence	
THG Plc v Zedra Trust Company (Jersey) Ltd	[2026] UKSC 6	25 February 2026	Limitation, Companies Act 2006	
Boyd v Public Prosecution Service for Northern Ireland	[2026] UKSC 7	25 February 2026	Law of Northern Ireland, Sentencing	
R v ABJ	[2026] UKSC 8	26 February 2026	Article 10 of the European Convention on Human Rights, Terrorism Act 2000	
Republic of Zimbabwe v Border Timbers Ltd; The Kingdom of Spain v Infrastructure Services Luxembourg SARL	[2026] UKSC 9	4 March 2026	State Immunity Act 1978	
UniCredit Bank GmbH, London Branch v Constitution Aircraft Leasing (Ireland) 3 Ltd	[2026] UKSC 10	25 March 2026	Sanctions involving Russia	
Kession Capital Ltd (in Liquidation) v KVB Consultants	[2026] UKSC 11	25 March 2026	Financial Services and Markets Act 2000	
Orsted West of Duddon Sands (UK) Limited (now named Orsted Schroders Greencoat WODS Holdco Limited) v Commissioners for His Majesty's Revenue and Customs	[2026] UKSC 12	15 April 2026	Capital Allowances Act 2001	
In the matter of X and Y (Children: Adoption Order: Setting Aside)	[2026] UKSC 13	22 April 2026	Adoption and Children Act 2002	
Gatwick Investment Ltd v Liberty Mutual Insurance Europe SE; Bath Racecourse Company Ltd and others v Liberty Mutual Insurance Europe SE	[2026] UKSC 14	23 April 2026	Construction of insurance savings clauses; COVID-19 furlough payments	
In the matter of an application by Martina Dillon, John McEvoy, Brigid Hughes and Lynda McManus for Judicial Review	[2026] UKSC 15	7 May 2026	Northern Ireland Troubles (Legacy and Reconciliation) Act 2023	
A Reference by the Attorney General for Northern Ireland of a devolution issue under paragraph 34 of Schedule 10 to the Northern Ireland Act 1998	[2026] UKSC 16	2 June 2026	Deprivation of Liberty Safeguards	7 judges
Commissioners for His Majesty's Revenue and Customs v HFFX LLP; Atkins and others v Commissioners for His Majesty's Revenue and Customs	[2026] UKSC 17	17 June 2026	Income tax, limited liability partnerships	
Commissioners for His Majesty's Revenue and Customs v BlueCrest Capital Management (UK) LLP	[2026] UKSC 18	1 July 2026	Income tax, salaried members rules for LLPs	
Skatteforvaltningen (The Danish Customs and Tax Administration) v MCML Ltd (previously known as ED&F Man Capital Markets Ltd)	[2026] UKSC 19	1 July 2026	Issue estoppel	
R v McCafferty and others	[2026] UKSC 20	14 July 2026	Public nuisance, Police, Crime, Sentencing and Courts Act 2022	
Saxon Woods Investments Limited and others v Costa	[2026] UKSC 21	14 July 2026	Directors' duties	
R (on the application of Bano) v London Borough of Waltham Forest	[2026] UKSC 22	22 July 2026	Housing Act 1996, homelessness	
Great Asia Maritime Limited v Orion Shipping and Trading LLC	[2026] UKSC 23	22 July 2026	Maritime law, termination for repudiatory breach	
AXA Insurance UK PLC and another v Commissioners of Inland Revenue and another	[2026] UKSC 24	27 July 2026	Group litigation orders, Civil Procedure Rules	
The Kingdom of Bahrain v Shehabi and another	[2026] UKSC 25	27 July 2026	State Immunity Act 1978	
Akbars Restaurant (Middlesbrough) Limited v Secretary of State for the Home Department	[2026] UKSC 26	27 July 2026	Immigration, Asylum and Nationality Act 2006, civil penalties	
Tesla, Inc and another v InterDigital Patent Holdings, Inc and others; Tesla, Inc and others v InterDigital Patent Holdings, Inc and another No 2	[2026] UKSC 27	27 July 2026	Patents, FRAND licensing	
R v Sheikh and others	[2026] UKSC 28	27 July 2026	Domestic Violence, Crime and Victims Act 2004	
Drelle v Servis-Terminal LLC (In Liquidation in the Russian Federation)	[2026] UKSC 29	27 July 2026	Insolvency Act 1986, foreign judgments	
Augustine v Data Cars Limited	[2026] UKSC 30	12 August 2026	Part-time Workers (Prevention of Less Favourable Treatment) Regulations 2000	
Avon Freeholds Limited v Cresta Court E RTM Company Limited	[2026] UKSC 31	27 August 2026	Commonhold and Leasehold Reform Act 2002, right to manage	
In the Petition of DM	[2026] UKSC 32	9 September 2026	Hague Convention on the Civil Aspects of International Child Abduction	
Forthwell Limited v Pontegadea UK Limited	[2026] UKSC 33	17 September 2026	Scots law, damages for breach of contract (transferred loss)	
R (on the application of Quaye) v Secretary of State for Justice	[2026] UKSC 34	22 September 2026	Detention At His Majesty's pleasure	
ScottishPower (SCPL) Limited and others v Commissioners for His Majesty’s Revenue and Customs	[2026] UKSC 35	21 October 2026	Deduction of penalties from tax	
Kingdom of Spain v The London Steam-Ship Owners' Mutual Insurance Association Limited (No 2)	[2026] UKSC 36	28 October 2026	State Immunity Act 1978	
