= Pimlico Plumbers Ltd v Smith =

2018 UK Supreme Court case on labour law

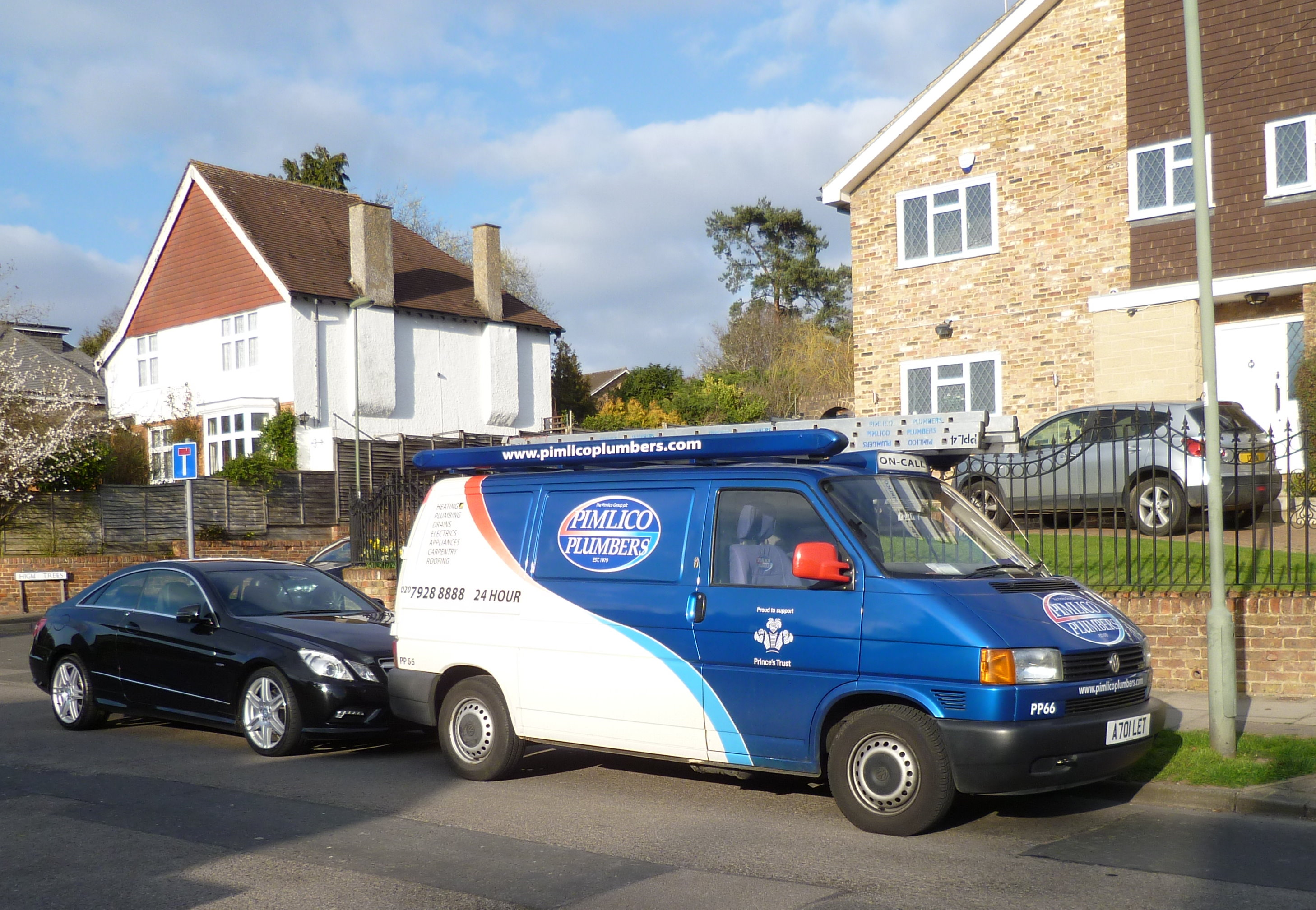
- Court: UK Supreme Court
- Citations: [2018] UKSC 29, [2017] EWCA Civ 51

Keywords
- Scope of employment

Pimlico Plumbers Ltd v Smith [2018] UKSC 29 is a UK labour law case, concerning the status of a plumbing and heating engineer, as, at least, a "worker" within the meaning of section 230(3) of the Employment Rights Act 1996 and other UK legislation, for the purpose of assessing his entitlement to holiday pay and unpaid wages.

== Facts ==
Mr Smith claimed wrongful and unfair dismissal, sick pay, holiday pay and shortfall in wages from Pimlico Plumbers Ltd. He did plumbing between August 2005 and April 2011, but his contract said he was self-employed from 2009, while an original document said he was a ‘sub-contracted employee’ in 2005. He wore a uniform with a logo, had a company mobile phone, and a company ID card. Pimlico charged for van rental monthly. Smith only worked for Pimlico, but he sometimes rejected jobs, and decided his own working hours, being unsupervised while plumbing. Normal work hours were 5 days a week, with a 40-hour minimum, although Pimlico had no obligation to provide work every day. After having a heart attack Pimlico no longer engaged him, and he brought his claims.

The Tribunal held that Mr Smith was a worker, but not an employee entitled to dismissal protection, but to pay and holiday rights. The Employment Appeal Tribunal also held he was a worker under ERA 1996 s 230(3)(b), WTR 1998 reg 2 and EA 2010 s 83(2)(a) but not an employee. This decision was not appealed.

== Judgment ==
=== Court of Appeal ===
Court of Appeal held that Mr Smith was a worker. Sir Terence Etherton MR said both parties agreed the 2009 agreement reflected the current relationship, and the Tribunal was entitled to conclude Smith was obliged to do 40 hours a week, even if not enforced. The notion that there was no legal obligation to provide work was consistent with the reality that there may be no work.

119. We were told by counsel that the final submissions to the ET were all in writing and that there were no closing oral submissions. In a complex and important case like the present one, that course is unsatisfactory, carries considerable risk and should be avoided if at all possible. It does not give the ET the opportunity to question and test the case of each side in the light of the evidence and to clarify submissions which are or appear to be inconsistent or unclear.

Davis LJ agreed.

Underhill LJ concurred.

123. ... it is now established that the criteria [for section 230(3)(b) worker status] apply equally to the more economical language of section 83(2) of the 2010 Act’ ([123]); a similar observation can be found in His Lordship’s judgment in Windle [8].

=== Supreme Court ===
The Supreme Court held that Mr Smith was a worker, entitled to holiday pay and wage protection. He personally performed work, and any contractual right to have a substitute was constrained, not unfettered and discretionary. Pimlico Plumbers was not a client or a customer, since it controlled his work closely, and the Supreme Court declined to answer whether a contract subsisting between assignments indicated less control, as on the facts there was. In his leading judgment, Lord Wilson said the following:

PERSONAL PERFORMANCE?

20. If he was to qualify as a limb (b) worker, it was necessary for Mr Smith to have undertaken to “perform personally” his work or services for Pimlico. An obligation of personal performance is also a necessary constituent of a contract of service; so decisions in that field can legitimately be mined for guidance as to what, more precisely, personal performance means in the case of a limb (b) worker.

21. Express & Echo Publications Ltd v Tanton [1999] ICR 693 was a clear case. Mr Tanton contracted with the company to deliver its newspapers around Devon. A term of the contract provided:

“In the event that the contractor is unable or unwilling to perform the services personally he shall arrange at his own expense entirely for another suitable person to perform the services.”

The Court of Appeal held that the term defeated Mr Tanton’s claim to have been employed under a contract of service.

22. Nevertheless, in his classic exposition of the ingredients of a contract of service in Ready Mixed Concrete (South East) Ltd v Minister of Pensions and National Insurance [1968] 2 QB 497, MacKenna J added an important qualification. He said at p 515:

“Freedom to do a job either by one’s own hands or by another’s is inconsistent with a contract of service, though a limited or occasional power of delegation may not be …”

He cited Atiyah’s Vicarious Liability in the Law of Torts (1967), in which it was stated at p 59 that “it seems reasonably clear that an essential feature of a contract of service is the performance of at least part of the work by the servant himself”.

23. Where, then, lie the boundaries of a right to substitute consistent with personal performance?

24. Mr Smith’s contracts with Pimlico, including the manual, gave him no express right to appoint a substitute to do his work. There were three passing references in the manual to his engagement of other people, of which the most explicit was the reference, quoted at para 19(f) above, to his requiring “assistance”. The evidence was indeed that some of Pimlico’s operatives were accompanied by an apprentice or that they brought a mate to assist them. But assistance in performance is not the substitution of performance. Equally the tribunal found that, where a Pimlico operative lacked a specialist skill which a job required, he had a right to bring in an external contractor with the requisite specialism. But again, since in those circumstances the operative continued to do the basic work, he is not to be regarded as having substituted the specialist to perform it.

25. But the tribunal found that Mr Smith did have a limited facility to substitute. For he had accepted that, if he had quoted for work but another more lucrative job had subsequently arisen, he would be allowed to arrange for the work to be done by another Pimlico operative.

...

27. So Pimlico there put before the tribunal an irrelevant contract, cast in highly confusing terms, and now complains that the tribunal’s interpretation of them was highly confused. Irrespective of whether a wider right of substitution would have been fatal to Mr Smith’s claim, this court can in my view be confident that the tribunal found, and was entitled to find, that Mr Smith’s only right of substitution was of another Pimlico operative. Such is the judge’s express finding both in the central part of her judgment and again in her conclusion. Ambiguous terms of a contract to which Mr Smith was not a party cannot widen it.

28. So the question becomes: was Mr Smith’s right to substitute another Pimlico operative inconsistent with an obligation of personal performance? It is important to note that the right was not limited to days when, by reason of illness or otherwise, Mr Smith was unable to do the work. His own example of an opportunity to accept a more lucrative assignment elsewhere demonstrates its wider reach.

29. The judge concluded that the right to substitute another Pimlico operative did not negative Mr Smith’s obligation of personal performance. She held that it was a means of work distribution between the operatives and akin to the swapping of shifts within a workforce.

...

34. The tribunal was clearly entitled to hold, albeit in different words, that the dominant feature of Mr Smith’s contracts with Pimlico was an obligation of personal performance. To the extent that his facility to appoint a substitute was the product of a contractual right, the limitation of it was significant: the substitute had to come from the ranks of Pimlico operatives, in other words from those bound to Pimlico by an identical suite of heavy obligations. It was the converse of a situation in which the other party is uninterested in the identity of the substitute, provided only that the work gets done. The tribunal was entitled to conclude that Mr Smith had established that he was a limb (b) worker - unless the status of Pimlico by virtue of the contract was that of a client or customer of his.

CLIENT OR CUSTOMER?

35. It is unusual for the law to define a category of people by reference to a negative - in this case to another person’s lack of a particular status. It usually attempts to define positively what the attributes of the category should be. In Byrne Bros (Formwork) Ltd v Baird [2002] ICR 667 at para 16 Mr Recorder Underhill QC (as Underhill LJ then was) described as clumsily worded the requirement that the other party be neither a client nor a customer. It is hard to disagree.

36. In determining whether Pimlico should be regarded as a client or customer of Mr Smith, how relevant was it to discern the extent of Pimlico’s contractual obligation to offer him work and the extent of his obligation to accept such work as it offered to him? The answer is not easy. Clearly the foundation of his claim to be a limb (b) worker was that he had bound himself contractually to perform work for Pimlico. No one has denied that, while he was working on assignments for Pimlico, he was doing so pursuant to a contractual obligation to Pimlico. Does that not suffice? Is it necessary, or even relevant, to ask whether Mr Smith’s contract with Pimlico cast obligations on him during the periods between his work on its assignments?

37. In the event both of the specialist tribunals and the Court of Appeal all chose, albeit with difficulty, to wrestle with whether Mr Smith’s contract with Pimlico was an umbrella contract, in other words was one which cast obligations on him during the periods between his work on assignments for Pimlico; or whether it was a contract which cast obligations on him only during his performance of such successive assignments as were offered to him by Pimlico and accepted by him.

38. The difficulty arose - again - from Pimlico’s apparently inconsistent contractual provisions. The 2009 contract provided (see para 18(c) above):

“… the Company shall be under no obligation to offer you work and you shall be under no obligation to accept such work from the Company.”

But the manual stated (see para 19(b) above):

“Normal Working Hours consist of a five day week, in which you should complete a minimum of 40 hours.”

Pimlico suggests that, to the extent that its contract and its manual are inconsistent, the former should prevail.

39. But the tribunal found that a purposive construction of the two provisions enabled them to be reconciled. It found, in accordance with Mr Smith’s evidence, that Pimlico

“had no obligation to provide him with work on any particular day and if there was not enough work [it] would not have to provide him with work and he would not be paid.”

40. The Court of Appeal construed this finding, in my view legitimately, as being that, if by contrast it did have enough work to offer to Mr Smith, Pimlico would be obliged to offer it to him. In other words Pimlico’s contractual obligation was to offer work to Mr Smith but only if it was available; indeed, if the work was available, it would seem hard to understand why in the normal course of events Pimlico would not be content to be obliged to offer it to him. Mr Smith’s contractual obligation by contrast was in principle to keep himself available to work for up to 40 hours on five days each week on such assignments as Pimlico might offer to him. But his contractual obligation was without prejudice to his entitlement to decline a particular assignment in the light (for example) of its location; and of course it did not preclude Pimlico from electing, as seems to have occurred, not to insist on his compliance with the obligation in any event.

41. So the tribunal found, legitimately, that there was an umbrella contract between Mr Smith and Pimlico. It is therefore unnecessary to consider the relevance to limb (b) status of a finding that contractual obligations subsisted only during assignments. The leading authority in this respect is now Windle v Secretary of State for Justice [2016] ICR 721, in which Underhill LJ suggested at para 23 that a person’s lack of contractual obligation between assignments might indicate a lack of subordination consistent with the other party being no more than his client or customer. The energetic submission of Ms Monaghan QC on behalf of Mr Smith that, on the contrary, it might indicate a greater degree of subordination to that other party must await appraisal on another occasion.

42. Mr Smith correctly presented himself as self-employed for the purposes of income tax and VAT. His accounts for the six years ending on 5 April 2011 were put in evidence. Mr Smith clearly took advantage of the facility to purchase materials himself for use on each assignment and to charge the customer, albeit funnelled through Pimlico, 20% more than he had paid for them. His accounts for the year ended 5 April 2011 showed turnover of about £131,000, cost of materials of about £53,000 and, following deduction of motor and other expenses, a net pre-tax profit of about £48,000.

...

48. On the other hand, there were features of the contract which strongly militated against recognition of Pimlico as a client or customer of Mr Smith. Its tight control over him was reflected in its requirements that he should wear the branded Pimlico uniform; drive its branded van, to which Pimlico applied a tracker; carry its identity card; and closely follow the administrative instructions of its control room. The severe terms as to when and how much it was obliged to pay him, on which it relied, betrayed a grip on his economy inconsistent with his being a truly independent contractor. The contract made references to “wages”, “gross misconduct” and “dismissal”. Were these terms ill-considered lapses which shed light on its true nature? And then there was a suite of covenants restrictive of his working activities following termination.

49. ... this court’s own conclusion [is] that Pimlico cannot be regarded as a client or customer of Mr Smith. The proper disposal is, of course, for it to declare that, on the evidence before it, the tribunal was, by a reasonable margin, entitled so to conclude.

== See also ==
- UK labour law
