= Wolverhampton City Council v London Gypsies and Travellers =

2023 United Kingdom Supreme Court case

- Court: Supreme Court of the United Kingdom
- Decided: 29 November 2023
- Citation: [2023] UKSC 47; [2024] 2 All E.R. 431

Case history
- Appealed from: [2022] EWCA Civ 13

Wolverhampton City Council v London Gypsies and Travellers is a United Kingdom Supreme Court case in which the Court upheld an injunction awarded to the respondent local government authorities which prevented any individuals establishing unauthorised encampments on local authority land.

== Background ==
Since 2015, local authorities have increasingly sought injunctions against "persons unknown" to prevent unauthorised encampments on accessible public lands.

The appellants, representing the Gypsies and Travellers community, opposed these injunctions primarily by invoking the conventional common law principle that injunctions should be limited to identified defendants who have been served with proceedings, rather than being imposed universally. The appellants objected that the impugned injunction effectively functioned as local law, regulating land use and criminalising conduct through the threat of contempt of court.

== Judgment ==
Lords Reed, Briggs and Kitchin delivered the judgment dismissing the appeal, with Lords Hodge and Lloyd-Jones concurring.
