= Athens Convention =

1974 maritime treaty

The Athens Convention relating to the Carriage of Passengers and their Luggage by Sea (PAL) is an International Maritime Organization (IMO) legal Convention.

== History ==
The convention was adopted at an international conference in Athens on 13 December 1974. It entered into force on 28 April 1987. It harmonised two earlier conventions relating to damage or loss for ship passengers and their luggage.

=== 2002 Protocol ===
In 2002, a Protocol to update the convention was adopted on 1 November. It entered into force on 23 April 2014. The 2002 Protocol substantially increases the liability limits for shipowners and covers death or personal injury to passengers, as well as damage to both luggage and vehicles.

== Content ==
The Convention sets out international liability requirements for maritime passengers. It applies to seagoing vessels. The convention sets out that a carrier is liable for damage or loss suffered to the passenger and their luggage if the damage and loss were due to fault and neglect. This includes death. Financial compensation is assigned under set values for Special drawing rights per passenger.

== Ratification ==
The content has been ratified by Argentina, Bahamas, Barbados, Belgium, China, Croatia, Egypt, Equatorial Guinea, Germany, Georgia, Greece, Guyana, Hong Kong, Ireland, Jordan, Liberia, Luxembourg, Malawi, Marshall Islands, Poland, Spain, Switzerland, Tonga, Ukraine, Russia, United Kingdom, Vanuatu and Yemen.
