= Belgian Linguistic Case (No. 2) =

1968 European Court of Human Rights case

The Belgian Linguistic case (No. 2) (1968) 1 EHRR 252 is a formative case on the right to education and the right to freedom from discrimination under the European Convention of Human Rights, Protocol 1, art 2. It related to "certain aspects of the laws on the use of languages in education in Belgium", was decided by the European Court of Human Rights in 1968.

== Facts ==
The applicants submitted six applications (Applications No: 1474/62, 1677/62, 1691/62, 1769/63, 1994/63, 2126/64) between 1962 and 1964 on their own behalf and on the behalf of their children, alleging that Belgian linguistic legislation, relating to education, infringed on their rights under the European Convention, namely Article 8 (family life) in conjunction with Article 14 (non-discrimination), and Article 2 of the Protocol 1 (right to education) of March 1952. The Acts they brought litigation against basically stated the language of education shall be Dutch in the Dutch-speaking region, French in the French-speaking region and German in the German-speaking region.

=== Counsel submissions ===
The applicants, whose children totalled more than 800, asserted that the law of the Dutch-speaking regions where they lived did not include adequate provisions for French-language education. They also complained that the Belgian state withheld grants from institutions in these regions that did not comply with the linguistic provisions set out in the legislation for schools and refused to homologate certificates issued by these institutions. Further, the state did not allow the applicants’ children to attend French classes in certain places, forcing applicants to enrol their children in local schools, contrary to their aspirations, or send them further afield, which entailed risks and hardships.

The Government argued that the right to education in one's own language was not included in the Convention and the Protocol, and that the applicants did not belong to a national minority within the meaning of Article 14.

== Judgment ==
=== Outcome ===
The Court found by a majority of 8 to 7 that one of the Acts violated Art 14. But the Court also found unanimously that there had been no breach of Articles 8 and 14 of the Convention, and Article 2 of the protocol, with regard to the other contested legislation and points at issue.

=== Reasoning ===
The case is significant because of the Court's willingness to find a breach of Article 14 without a concurrent violation of another Convention right.

Article 14 (art. 14) of the Convention provides that: "The enjoyment of the rights and freedoms set forth in this Convention shall be secured without discrimination on any [of the grounds]." It was not clear from the early case law of the court whether Article 14 could be interpreted to carry any independent force in the absence of a breach of another Convention right. Indeed, the Belgian Government sought to advance a narrow construction of the Article and submitted before the Commission that "a violation of Article 14 (art. 14) without simultaneous violation of another Article of the Convention is legally impossible". This interpretation would have made Article 14 redundant, however: if the applicants could demonstrate that their otherwise recognised rights have been breached, Article 14 would have had no independent role to play.

The court rejected that construction of Article 14. It relied, inter alia, on the general nature of the opening terms employed in Article 14, "the enjoyment of the rights and freedoms set forth in this Convention shall be secured" (emphasis added). Thus, it sufficed that State action fell within the ambit of another Convention right, without violating it, for Article 14 to be engaged. This was a significant milestone in recognising an independent basis for a right of non-discrimination under the Convention.

==== Legal analysis ====
In reaching its decision the Court considered that the principle of equality of treatment enshrined in Article 14 was violated if the distinction had no objective and reasonable justification, did not pursue a legitimate aim, and was not proportionate to the aim pursued. Further to this, the Court opined that the right to education implied the right to be educated in the national language, and did not include the provision that the parent's linguistic preferences be respected.

The operative part of the Court's judgment read as follows.

2. The Court will address itself first to Article 2 of the Protocol because the Contracting States made express provision with reference to the right to education in this Article.
3. By the terms of the first sentence of this Article, 'no person shall be denied the right to education'. In spite of its negative formulation, this provision uses the term 'right' and speaks of a 'right to education'. Likewise the preamble to the Protocol specifies that the object of the Protocol lies in the collective enforcement of 'rights and freedoms'. There is therefore no doubt that Article 2 does enshrine a right. It remains, however, to determine the content of this right and the scope of the obligation it places upon States. The negative formulation indicates, as is confirmed by the preparatory work, that the Contracting Parties do not recognise such a right to education as would require them to establish at their own expense, or to subsidise, education of any particular type or at any particular level. However, it cannot be concluded from this that the State has no positive obligation to ensure respect for such a right as is protected by Article 2 of the Protocol. As a 'right' does exist, it is secured, by virtue of Article 1 of the Convention, to everyone within the jurisdiction of a Contracting State. To determine the scope of the 'right to education', within the meaning of the first sentence of Article 2 of the Protocol, the Court must bear in mind the aim of this provision. It notes in this context that all member States of the Council of Europe possessed, at the time of the opening of the Protocol to their signature, and still do possess, a general and official educational system. There neither was, nor is now, therefore, any question of requiring each State to establish such a system, but merely of guaranteeing to persons subject to the jurisdiction of the Contracting Parties the right, in principle, to avail themselves of the means of instruction existing at a given time. The Convention lays down no specific obligations concerning the extent of these means and the manner of their organisation or subsidisation. In particular, the first sentence of Article 2 does not specify the language in which education must be conducted in order that the right to education should be respected. It does not contain precise provisions similar to those in Articles 5(2) and 6(3)(a) and (e). However, the right to education would be meaningless if it did not imply, in favour of its beneficiaries, the right to be educated in the national language or in one of the national languages, as the case may be.
4. The first sentence of Article 2 of the Protocol consequently guarantees, in the first place, a right of access to educational institutions existing at a given time, but such access constitutes only a part of the right to education. For the 'right to education' to be effective, it is further necessary that, inter alia, the individual who is the beneficiary should have the possibility of drawing profit from the education received, that is to say, the right to obtain, in conformity with the rules in force in each State, and in one form or another, official recognition of the studies he has completed. The Court will deal with this matter in greater detail when it examines the last of the six specific questions listed in the submissions of those who appeared before it.
5. The right to education guaranteed by the first sentence of Article 2 of the Protocol by its very nature calls for regulation by the State, regulation that may vary in time and place according to needs and resources of the community and of individuals. It goes without saying that such regulation must never injure the substance of the right to education nor conflict with other rights enshrined in the Convention. The Court considers that the general aim set for themselves by the Contracting Parties through the medium of the European Convention on Human Rights was to provide effective protection of fundamental human rights, and this, without doubt, not only because of the historical context in which the Convention concluded, but also of the social and technical developments in our age that offer States considerable possibilities for regulating the exercise of these rights. The Convention therefore implies a just balance between the protection of the general interest of the community and the respect due to fundamental human rights while attaching particular importance to the latter....
7. The first sentence of Article 2 contains in itself no linguistic requirement. It guarantees the right of access to educational establishments existing at a given time and the right to obtain, in conformity with the rules in force in each State and, in one form or another, the official recognition of completed studies, this last right not being relevant to the point dealt with here.

== See also ==
- ECHR
- Kjeldsen, Busk, Madsen and Pedersen v Denmark (1976) 1 EHRR 711
- Campbell and Cosans v United Kingdom (1982) 4 EHRR 293
- Ali (FC) v Headteacher and Governors of Lord Grey School [2006] UKHL 14
