= Collective enfranchisement =

Legal term in English property law

Collective enfranchisement is a legal term in English property law used to describe a process whereby leaseholders of a block of flats of apartments can buy out their freeholder. The right to collective enfranchisement was granted by the Leasehold Reform Housing and Urban Development Act 1993.

== See also ==
- English land law
