= Wells v Devani =

UK Supreme Court case on agreements to agree under English contract law

- Court: UK Supreme Court
- Citation: [2019] UKSC 4

Keywords
- Agreement

Wells v Devani [2019] UKSC 4 is an English contract law case, concerning agreements to agree.

== Facts ==
Devani, an estate agent, claimed Wells, a flat seller, owed him a commission for completing flat sales after he introduced a buyer to Wells. Wells finished developing a flat block in 2007, but seven were unsold by 2008, when Wells’ neighbour emailed Devani, the estate agent, telling him. Devani then called Wells. Devani claimed that he told Wells he was an estate agent and his commission was 2% plus VAT, but Wells argued there was never any discussion of commission. Devani contacted Newlon Housing Trust, which agreed to buy the flats for £2.1m. Once completed, Devani claimed a commission, and Wells refused.

Judge Moloney QC held there was a binding contract, but because Devani did not submit written terms it was subject to a one third reduction under the Estate Agents Act 1979 section 18. The Court of Appeal held there was no contract.

== Judgment ==
Supreme Court held there was a binding contract, and its terms were certain, though the Estate Agents Act 1979 section 18 was not complied with. Lord Kitchin gave the first judgement. Lord Kitchin said the following:

18. It may be the case that the words and conduct relied upon are so vague and lacking in specificity that the court is unable to identify the terms on which the parties have reached agreement or to attribute to the parties any contractual intention. But the courts are reluctant to find an agreement is too vague or uncertain to be enforced where it is found that the parties had the intention of being contractually bound and have acted on their agreement. As Lord Wright said in G Scammel & Nephew Ltd v HC and JG Ouston [1941] AC 251, 268:

“The object of the court is to do justice between the parties, and the court will do its best, if satisfied that there was an ascertainable and determinate intention to contract, to give effect to that intention, looking at substance and not mere form. It will not be deterred by mere difficulties of interpretation. Difficulty is not synonymous with ambiguity so long as any definite meaning can be extracted. But the test of intention is to be found in the words used. If these words, considered however broadly and untechnically and with due regard to all the just implications, fail to evince any definite meaning on which the court can safely act, the court has no choice but to say that there is no contract. Such a position is not often found.”

19. As I have explained, the judge had no doubt that the parties did intend to create legal relations and that they understood that Mr Devani’s terms were that he would be entitled to a commission of 2% plus VAT. Mr Devani then introduced Mr Wells to a prospective purchaser, Newlon, and that introduction led directly to the completed sale. It is true that, as the judge found, there was no discussion of the precise event which would give rise to the payment of that commission but, absent a provision to the contrary, I have no doubt it would naturally be understood that payment would become due on completion and made from the proceeds of sale. Indeed, it seems to me that is the only sensible interpretation of what they said to each other in the course of their telephone conversation on 29 January 2008 and the circumstances in which that conversation took place. In short, Mr Devani and Mr Wells agreed that if Mr Devani found a purchaser for the flats he would be paid his commission. He found Newlon and it became the purchaser on completion of the transaction. At that point, Mr Devani became entitled to his commission and it was payable from the proceeds of sale.

20. This interpretation of the parties’ words and conduct is in my view amply supported by authority. For example, in Fowler v Bratt [1950] KB 96, the plaintiff, a house agent, was instructed by the defendant to find a purchaser of his house and agreed to pay a commission on the price. Subsequently the defendant decided not to go through with the sale and the plaintiff brought proceedings for his commission. The Court of Appeal held that, in order to earn his commission, the plaintiff had at least to find a purchaser who was bound in law to buy, and that he had done. The case is of particular relevance to this appeal in light of this passage in the judgment of Denning LJ (at pp 104-105):

“I confess that I approach claims by estate agents from the point of view, which I am sure is the common understanding of men, namely, that, in the absence of express terms to the contrary, the commission of the agents is to be paid out of the proceeds of sale. If the sale does not go through, the presumption is that no commission is payable. But in point of law if an agent succeeds in finding a person who actually enters into a binding and enforceable contract to purchase, and if that contract afterwards goes off by the vendor’s default, the vendor is liable to pay commission.”

...

27. For these reasons I do not think the judge needed to imply a term into the agreement between Mr Devani and Mr Wells. However, had it been necessary and for the reasons which follow, I would have had no hesitation in holding that it was an implied term of the agreement that payment would fall due on completion of the purchase of the property by a person whom Mr Devani had introduced.

28. In Marks & Spencer plc v BNP Paribas Securities Services Trust Co (Jersey) Ltd [2015] UKSC 72; [2016] AC 742, the Supreme Court made clear that there has been no dilution of the conditions which have to be satisfied before a term will be implied and the fact that it may be reasonable to imply a term is not sufficient. Lord Neuberger of Abbotsbury PSC, with whom Lord Sumption and Lord Hodge JJSC agreed without qualification, explained (at paras 26 to 31) that (i) construing the words the parties have used in their contract and (ii) implying terms into the contract, involve determining the scope and meaning of the contract; but construing the words used and implying additional words are different processes governed by different rules. In most cases, it is only after the process of construing the express words of an agreement is complete that the issue of whether a term is to be implied falls to be considered. Importantly for present purposes, Lord Neuberger also made clear (at paras 23 and 24) that a term will only be implied where it is necessary to give the contract business efficacy or it would be so obvious that “it goes without saying”.

...

54. I recognise that section 18 and the regulations are, as Lewison LJ rightly said, a form of consumer protection, and that their purpose is to ensure that a person instructing an estate agent knows what his liabilities to the agent are before he engages him. I also accept that there may be cases where the degree of culpability is so great that it justifies dismissal of the agent’s application even if the client has suffered no prejudice. But I am not persuaded that this is one of those cases. The judge assessed the extent of Mr Devani’s culpability with care. He recognised that Mr Devani could and should have provided his terms of business to Mr Wells at the outset but also had regard to the fact that the job needed to be done urgently, that Mr Wells was abroad, that events moved very quickly and that the effective period of delay was less than one week. I would add that there was no finding that Mr Devani acted improperly in any other way. The judge assessed all of these matters and the issue of prejudice and decided to allow Mr Devani to pursue his claim but with a significant fee reduction. It is true that Lewison LJ thought the judge ought to have regarded the speed of events as an aggravating rather than a mitigating factor when considering culpability, but he was also of the view that this was not an error which justified any interference with the judge’s conclusion. I agree with him. In all these circumstances, I am satisfied that Mr Devani’s culpability was not so great as to justify dismissal of his application, and the judge made no material error in so deciding.

== See also ==
- English contract law
