= R (UNISON) v Lord Chancellor =

2017 UK Supreme Court case

- Court: UK Supreme Court
- Full case name: R (on the application of UNISON) v Lord Chancellor
- Decided: 26 July 2017
- Citation: [2017] UKSC 51

Case history
- Appealed from: Divisional Court of the Administrative Court [2014] EWHC 218 (Admin); Divisional Court of the Administrative Court [2014] EWHC 4198 (Admin); Court of Appeal of England and Wales [2015] EWCA Civ 935

Court membership
- Judges sitting: Lord Neuberger, Lady Hale, Lord Mance, Lord Kerr, Lord Wilson, Lord Reed, Lord Hughes

Case opinions
- Lord Reed: The Employment Appeal Tribunal Fees Order 2013 which imposed fees on appeals from employment tribunals is unlawful ab initio under English and European Union law as it has the effect of preventing access to justice.; Lady Hale, obiter: While discrimination under the Equality Act 2010 was not considered as the Order was unlawful ab initio, it was likely that it was not discriminatory in its application.
- Concurrence: Neuberger, Hale, Mance, Kerr, Wilson, Reed, Hughes

Keywords
- Rule of law, Employment Appeal Tribunal Fees Order 2013, Tribunals, Courts and Enforcement Act 2007, judicial review

R (UNISON) v Lord Chancellor [2017] UKSC 51 is a UK labour law and UK constitutional law judgment of the Supreme Court of the United Kingdom. It held that fees for employment tribunals are unlawful because they impede access to justice, and defy the rule of law.

== Facts ==
Unison claimed that fees for employment tribunals were ultra vires. In 2013, the UK government introduced £1,200 fees to bring a typical case to an employment tribunal through the Employment Tribunals and the Employment Appeal Tribunal Fees Order 2013 (SI 2013/1893).

The Lord Chancellor purported to exercise this power under section 42(1) of the Tribunals, Courts and Enforcement Act 2007. Unison claimed that the order was ultra vires.

It was argued that "the making of the Fees Order was not a lawful exercise of those powers, because the prescribed fees interfere[d] unjustifiably with the right of access to justice under both the common law and EU law, frustrate the operation of parliamentary legislation granting employment rights, and discriminate unlawfully against women and other protected groups".

== Judgment ==
The Supreme Court unanimously held that employment tribunal fees were unlawful.

== See also ==
- United Kingdom labour law
