= Article 14 of the European Convention on Human Rights =

Clause prohibiting discrimination

Article 14 of the European Convention on Human Rights contains a prohibition on discrimination, specifically in the enjoyment of other rights set forth in the Convention. The Article states the following:

The enjoyment of the rights and freedoms set forth in [the] Convention shall be secured without discrimination on any ground such as sex, race, colour, language, religion, political or other opinion, national or social origin, association with a national minority, property, birth or other status.

== Scope ==
=== Categories of protected rights ===
Unlike the Universal Declaration of Human Rights, Article 14 does not protect against discrimination broadly, but only with regard to rights that fall under the European Convention of Human Rights (ECHR).

However, these rights are not only limited to those specified in the Convention, also including "additional rights, falling within the general scope of any Convention Article, for which the State has voluntarily decided to provide." For example, should a government create a scheme to give a tax credit to new parents, any discrimination in that scheme would violate Article 14, in conjunction with the Article 8 right to private and family life. This is due to the fact that, although the government is not required by Article 8 to give tax credits to new parents, it has done so voluntarily, and the credit will allow new parents to more fully enjoy their Article 8 rights.

=== Autonomy of Article 14 ===
In early cases before the European Court of Human Rights (ECtHR), the Court acted as though for Article 14 to have relevance, a breach of a separate, substantive Convention right had to have occurred. However, if such a breach did actually occur, the Court would generally find it unnecessary to consider Article 14, rendering it useless.

However, in the 1968 Belgian Linguistic case, applicants brought a complaint against a law requiring schools to deliver education in region-specific languages, with the effect that many children could not be taught in their own language. The ECtHR found no substantive violations, but did find that Article 14 was violated by at least one Act, setting the precedent that a violation of Article 14 may occur provided "the facts of a case fall within the ambit of another substantive provision of the Convention or its Protocols".

Despite the increased importance of Article 14 following the Belgian Linguistics case, the Court is still hesitant to examine complaints brought under it, stating that they will only do so if "a clear inequality of treatment [is] a fundamental aspect of the case." This standard has been criticised on the basis that it unnecessarily narrows the scope of Article 14, and therefore avoids consideration of justifiable claims of discrimination. Academic Paul Johnson has argued that the court is especially reticent to consider Article 14 claims with regard to sexual orientation, resulting in fewer protections for LGBTQ people.

== Forms of discrimination ==
Discrimination is defined by the ECtHR as "treating differently, without an objective and reasonable justification, persons in relevantly similar situations."

=== Direct discrimination ===
Direct discrimination occurs when a policy or measure is targeted towards people of a particular status, and is often treated the most seriously. An example of direct discrimination can be found in Ēcis v. Latvia, wherein there was a blanket ban on prison leave for male prisoners, but not for female prisoners.

=== Indirect discrimination ===
Indirect discrimination occurs when a “policy or measure which, though couched in neutral terms, discriminates against a group” by having a disproportionate effect on them in comparison to other people. For instance, in the case D. H. and Others v The Czech Republic, schoolchildren were made to take psychological tests which consistently resulted in Romani children of average or above average intelligence being placed in schools for mentally disabled children. The tests were formulated for the majority population, and the Czech government acknowledged that they took no account of Roma specifics. Although every child took the same tests, the policy effectively resulted in the segregation of Romani children into particular schools. Due to this, the tests were ruled to be a violation of Article 14.

Article 14 does not require discriminatory intent to be proven on the part of policy makers; discrimination can instead be established by statistical evidence. An advantage of this approach is that it makes it easier for applicants to bring claims, as they do not have to provide evidence as to specific lawmakers' motives. Despite this, the ECtHR has shown some indications that it may be willing to infer discriminatory intent from the statements of lawmakers and officials, indicating that although intention is not required to prove discrimination, the Court is still interested in determining the reasons discrimination has occurred.

=== Affirmative action ===
The expression "affirmative action" describes a set of policies that aim to assist groups that have been or are being discriminated against, in order to give them the same opportunities as others. These policies may include advertisement of certain job sectors to specific groups, training in specific skills, allocation of scholarships, or quotas. The Court focuses on substantive equality rather than formal equality, and therefore it considers affirmative action acceptable in certain circumstances. This was confirmed in Hoogendijk v The Netherlands, in which the Court stated that Article 14 "not only requires that persons in a similar situation must be treated in an equal manner but also requires that persons whose situations are significantly different must be treated differently." Affirmative action programs are thus only permissible as long as there is a "factual inequality" between groups, as once there is no longer an inequality, "the justification for the measure will disappear".

== Discrimination test ==
=== Grounds for discrimination ===
The article covers an open-ended list of prohibited grounds for discrimination and has been expanded over time to include such grounds as sexual orientation and gender identity. This can be seen most clearly in the contrast between the 2002 case Frette v France, and the 2008 case E. B. v France. The cases share similar facts: both applicants were gay, interested in adopting a child, and turned down due to their "lifestyle". While the Court found no violation in Frette, in E. B. they stated in no uncertain terms that only "particularly weighty and convincing reasons" could justify discrimination on the basis of sexual orientation. This is in part due to the doctrine of "margin of appreciation", which states that the ECtHR must give states some discretion in how they choose to implement the ECHR, given the variety of social and legal cultures in Europe. The margin of appreciation widens and narrows with reference to the consensus among European countries on which groups should be protected, and which rights should be regarded as essential. Thus, the category of protected statuses has grown broader over time.

The inclusion of the term "other status" has resulted in the Court ruling that Article 14 has been violated in respect to groups outside of the typical conception of protected categories. For example, the Court has recognised statuses such as victims of domestic violence, people born to unmarried parents, and people on remand. However, these less intrinsic categories have been subject to a "sliding scale" of protection, with the level of justification required to avoid violating Article 14 dependent on which status the appellant makes their claim under.

=== Comparability ===
As a claim of discrimination under Article 14 requires groups in "relevantly similar situations" to be treated differently, there is a requirement of a comparator group. For example, a woman may work in an office doing the same work as male colleagues, but earn less than them. If she wanted to bring a claim for discrimination, her "comparator group" would be those colleagues; they are the same as her with regards to job title and responsibilities, their only difference being their genders.

The requirement for a comparator group has been criticised as overly burdensome on applicants, who must first identify the particular status influencing their discrimination, then find a person or group who is in a similar position, differing only by their status. For some groups, this is extremely difficult. For example, migrants will often have multiple statuses distinguishing them from the majority population, including race, religion, nationality, ability to work, entitlement to benefits, etc. and finding a comparator who is similar in all categories but one can be challenging. The requirement has also been criticised on the basis that anti-discrimination law, by its nature, is designed to protect people who are different to the general population, and may therefore have trouble finding a suitable comparator.

=== Lack of justification ===
According to case law, any difference in treatment based on a protected status must be proportional to the legitimate aim pursued. This means that, if the applicant is able to prove they have been discriminated against due to their status, the burden falls to the State to prove that a) said discrimination was in service of a socially important goal, and b) the discrimination against those with the applicant's status was no greater than necessary to achieve that goal. Examples of legitimate aims include prevention of crime, protection of national security, and maintenance of a stable economy. What is considered a legitimate aim and necessary to pursue it also changes with the margin of appreciation. For example, in the 2017 case Bayev and Others v Russia, the Russian government defended a law banning the "promotion of homosexuality" by way of reference to family values. The ECtHR rejected their argument, on the basis that "families" are increasingly defined as including same-gender partners, meaning that promoting family values and acknowledging differences in sexual orientation were entirely compatible.

== Protocol 12 ==
Protocol 12 to the European Convention on Human Rights expands on Article 14 to include a freestanding prohibition of discrimination in "any right set forth by law". It is broader than Article 14 in that it does not require reference to a substantial Convention right for a claim to be brought. Introduced in 2000, it has been ratified by 20 of 47 Council of Europe states as of 2021.
