= Limitation periods in the United Kingdom =

Legal time limits for starting court actions

In the United Kingdom, there are time limits after which court actions cannot be taken in certain types of cases. These differ across the three legal systems in the United Kingdom. The United Kingdom has no statute of limitations for any criminal offence tried above magistrate level.

== Civil ==
=== England and Wales ===
Limitation of Prescription Act 1540
- Act of Parliament
- Parliament of England
- Long title: An Act for Limitation of Prescription.
- Citation: 32 Hen. 8. c. 2
- Territorial extent: England and Wales

Dates
- Royal assent: 24 July 1540
- Commencement: 12 April 1540 (Note: Start of session.)
- Repealed: 16 September 1887
Other legislation
Repealed by	Statute Law Revision Act 1887

Status: Repealed

Text of statute as originally enacted

Limitation was first brought in by Henry VIII, in the Limitation of Prescription Act 1540 (32 Hen. 8. c. 2).

In modern times, the key piece of legislation relating to civil claims in England and Wales is the Limitation Act 1980, which identifies the time limits for various types of cases.

==== Debt ====
If a lender allows six years to pass without receiving any payment, an action for recovery may become statute-barred.

==== Injury ====
The general time limit for injury litigation is three years, with multiple exceptions and special cases. The statute of limitations for injuries to children only starts at the age of eighteen. The statute of limitations for brain damage begins only when the victim has been medically acknowledged as regaining cognitive ability. The Montreal Convention (1999) and the Athens Convention (1974) govern the statute of limitations for compensation for injuries sustained on an aeroplane or while at sea, respectively.

The Crime and Policing Act 2026 exempts personal injury claims stemming from child sexual abuse from any limitation period, implementing a recommendation of the Independent Inquiry into Child Sexual Abuse. This was first applied by the High Court in KHX v Isle of Wight Council. Defendants in such cases can seek to have cases dismissed on the grounds of limitation if they can prove that a fair hearing cannot take place.

==== Libel ====
The limitation period for libel, slander, slander of title, slander of goods, or other malicious falsehood is one year.

==== Contracts ====
Contracts may provide their own limitation periods as agreed between the parties. In the case of Inframatric Investments v Dean Construction (2012), the prospective claimants were time-barred in seeking litigation against the defendant because a meeting where "without prejudice" negotiations had taken place, intended to resolve the parties' dispute, could not be treated as falling within the period up to practical completion of the contracted works, because they did not form part of the completed "services" from which, according to the contract, the limitation period was to be calculated.

=== Scotland ===
The principal piece of legislation governing civil limitation periods in Scotland is the Prescription and Limitation (Scotland) Act 1973, with significant amendments in 2018.

=== Northern Ireland ===
The main legislation covering limitation periods in Northern Ireland is the Limitation (Northern Ireland) Order 1989.

=== UK-wide ===
Most employment rights claims must be brought to an employment tribunal within three months (some are six months), unless "it was not reasonably practicable" for the claimant to bring the claim within the three month period. The three month limit is due to be increased to six by the Employment Rights Act 2025.

For unfair dismissal claims, the limitation period starts on the effective day of termination. For pay and wages claims, the limitation period starts when the employer failed to pay the employee. For discrimination claims, the limitation period is based on the last discriminatory act.

== Criminal ==
=== Indictable offences ===
Unlike other European countries, the United Kingdom has no general statute of limitations for crimes triable by jury, known as indictable offences. This includes either-way offences that are tried by jury.

=== Summary offences and either-way offences are tried summarily ===
In England and Wales, magistrates' courts hear summary and non-indicted either-way offences — generally, crimes that are punishable by a fine and/or by less than 6 months' imprisonment.

Section 127 of the Magistrates' Courts Act 1980 states that normally:

A magistrates' court shall not try an information or hear a complaint unless the information was laid or the complaint made within 6 months from the time when the offence was committed or the matter of complaint arose.

This time limit does not apply to either-way offences tried summarily. However, any time limit for such an offence imposed by statute binds the magistrates' court as it would a Crown court.

In Scotland, the time limit for a summary offence (regardless of which court tries it) is six months, unless an enactment sets a different time limit. The clock stops while the accused is deciding whether to accept a fixed penalty notice, compensation offer, or work offer in lieu of prosecution. The limit does not apply to either-way offences even if tried summarily.

==== Traffic offences ====
Section 1 of the Road Traffic Offenders Act 1988 and article 5 of The Road Traffic Offenders (Northern Ireland) Order 1996 require a Notice of Intended Prosecution (NIP) to be served within 14 days of applicable offences being committed; if that does not occur, it may follow that any further action may be prevented. However, there are exceptions to the 14-day rule; for example, if an "accident" (i.e., collision) occurs or if the vehicle was not being driven by the registered keeper of the vehicle (as, for example, a company vehicle), the police may make appropriate investigations. The date of the offence is excluded.

The onus is on the body issuing the Notice of Intended Prosecution (NIP) to ensure the notice is served within 14 days. The definition of "served" has changed. Prior to 1994, NIPs were served by registered or recorded post, but in 1994, the Road Traffic Offenders Act 1988 was amended to allow for standard postal delivery. Several successful defences to a NIP have been conducted on the production of the envelope that contained the NIP, in which the postmark on the envelope indicated to a court that the NIP could not have been received (served) within the 14-day limit.

==== Electoral offences ====
Section 176 of the Representation of the People Act 1983 requires that proceedings for any offence under that act, namely personation, fraudulent voting, vote tampering, violating vote secrecy, publishing pre-closure exit polls, etc., must begin within one year of the offence being committed.
