= Margin of appreciation =

Doctrine in international human rights law

The margin of appreciation (or margin of state discretion) is a legal doctrine with a wide scope in international human rights law. It was developed by the European Court of Human Rights to judge whether a state party to the European Convention on Human Rights should be sanctioned for limiting the enjoyment of rights. The doctrine allows the court to reconcile practical differences in implementing the articles of the convention. Such differences create a limited right for contracting parties "to derogate from the obligations laid down in the Convention". The doctrine also reinforces the role of the European Convention as a supervisory framework for human rights. In applying that discretion, the court's judges must take into account differences between domestic laws of the contracting parties as they relate to substance and procedure. The margin of appreciation doctrine contains concepts that are analogous to the principle of subsidiarity, which occurs in the unrelated field of EU law. The purposes of the margin of appreciation are to balance individual rights with national interests and to resolve any potential conflicts. It has been suggested that the European Court should generally refer to the State's decision, as it is an international court, instead of a bill of rights.

The margin of appreciation doctrine has "not found an explicit parallel development" by the Inter-American Court of Human Rights.

== Definition and origins ==
The phrase "margin of appreciation" is a literal translation of the French marge d'appréciation. The latter phrase refers to a notion of administrative law that was developed by the Conseil d'État, but equivalent concepts have also emerged in every other civil jurisdiction. At the level of the European Convention on Human Rights, a margin of appreciation refers to some "latitude of deference or error which the Strasbourg organs will allow to national legislative, executive, administrative and judicial bodies". That is an intermediary norm in the jurisprudence of the European Court of Human Rights. It allows for some compromise between the aspirations of the convention and the circumstances faced by a contracting party. The doctrine of administrative discretion first gained national levels of prominence, most notably under the German Bundesverwaltungsgericht (Supreme Administrative Court) before it was translated into a doctrine of supervisory discretion for a regional context.

The concept of a margin of appreciation at the European level emerged through questions surrounding martial law. It was introduced to European Convention jurisprudence in 1956, which occurred through an opinion of the European Commission of Human Rights in Greece v. United Kingdom to permit the United Kingdom, under Article 15, to derogate from its obligations during a time of public emergency in British Cyprus. Subsequently, the hearing for Lawless v Ireland (that is, the first formally decided case of the Court) included an oral argument from the Commission President Sir Humphrey Waldock:

"...a Government's discharge of...responsibilities [in maintaining law and order] is essentially a delicate problem of appreciating complex factors and of balancing conflicting considerations of the public interest; and that, once the...Court is satisfied that the Government's appreciation is at least on the margin of powers..., then the interest which the public itself has in effective Government and in the maintenance of order justifies and requires a decision in favour of the legality of the Government's appreciation."

Later, the "Belgian Linguistic Case (No. 2)" of 1968 introduced a margin of appreciation to circumstances that fell outside emergency situations that were identified by Article 15 of the European Convention. That case proved to be critical in establishing a wide scope for the emerging doctrine of discretion. It identified two key elements for establishing a margin of appreciation: a focused consensus standard among 'Convention signatory states' and a proportionality principle in the jurisprudence of the European Convention. The latter element consisted of two weighting factors, which are necessary to establish the extent of a particular margin. The factors are the 'nature of the right' in question and 'the aim pursued by the contested measure'. With an expansive doctrine in view, the European Court also sought to constrain itself by stating:

'...the Court cannot disregard those legal and factual features which characterize the life of the society in the State which...has to answer for the measure in dispute. In so doing, it cannot assume the role of the competent national authorities, for it would thereby lose sight of the subsidiary nature of the international machinery of collective enforcement established for the Convention'.

The margin of appreciation doctrine received considerable development in 1976, with the Court decision of Handyside v United Kingdom, which concerned the publication of a Danish textbook for primary school children in which sexual behaviour was discussed using explicit terms. It was successfully published in several signatory states but was met with controversy in the United Kingdom. Handyside, an English publisher, was convicted for violating domestic laws on obscene publications. The case that was brought before the European Court challenged whether the United Kingdom could infringe freedom of expression under Article 10 on the ground of protecting moral norms. The fact that the "Little Red Schoolbook" had been received in other European countries formed a basis for that challenge. However, the Court permitted the imposed limitation on freedom of expression and found no violation of the convention. It held:

'...it is not possible to find in the domestic law of the Contracting States a uniform conception of morals. The view taken by their respective laws... varies from time to time and from place to place.... By reason of their direct and continuous contact with the vital forces of their countries, State authorities are in principle in a better position than the international judge to give an opinion on the exact content of these requirements as well as on the "necessity" of a "restriction" or "penalty" intended to meet them'.

With that judgment, the European Court reinforced its distinction between the supervisory jurisdiction of the Convention framework and domestic forms of discretion. However, it also affirmed:

'The Court... is empowered to give a final ruling on whether a "restriction" or "penalty" is reconcilable with freedom of expression as protected by Article 10. The domestic margin of appreciation thus goes hand in hand with a European supervision'.

In the case of Z v. Finland, while accepting that individual interests could sometimes be outweighed by the public interest in the investigation and prosecution of crime, the court emphasised the fundamental importance of protecting the confidentiality of medical data for the sake of personal privacy and to preserve confidence in the medical profession and the health services. It found that measures including the disclosure of the applicant's medical records without her consent in the course of criminal proceedings against her husband amounted to a violation of Article 8.

== Scope and application ==
The European Court decision in Handyside v United Kingdom framed the margin of appreciation doctrine in terms of a systemic tension in the European Convention framework. It is therefore easy to distort the concept in a negative sense 'to circumvent the express requirements of the Convention'. However, the official position of the Court is that a margin of appreciation must be derived from 'a just balance between the protection of the general interest of the community and the respect due to fundamental human rights while attaching particular importance to the latter.' That precedent illustrates some continuity between the original function of a margin of appreciation, as a justified derogation simpliciter, and its present purpose of delimiting rights and freedoms for individuals in relation to state parties. However, a clear distinction has also been made between this latter substantive purpose, which evolved over time, as well as the structural aim of the doctrine. The structural purpose for a margin of appreciation was to construct 'a geographically and cultural plural notion of implementation'. As a result, the doctrine has continued to subsist in an unstructured set of elements. That is possible because the foundation concept of a margin is essentially abstract in nature and less connected to the core purposes of the convention, especially when it is compared with other interpretive principles like legality or the effective protection of rights.

Since justification for any derogation from the European Convention ultimately rests on the concept of democratic necessity in a society, margins of appreciation are situation-oriented, and the case law on the subject frequently lacks consistency. The expanded margin of appreciation doctrine has been used to interpret European Convention guarantees regarding due process (Articles 5 and 6) and personal freedoms (Articles 8-11). That infused the doctrine with a sense of ubiquity and has led to its invocation in major legal developments, including challenges surrounding discrimination as they relate to human rights. However, the doctrine has also been invoked in such varied questions as the enjoyment of possessions, the use of religious symbols and the implementation of environmental policies and regulations. The margin of appreciation in each of the categories of cases has differed according to the kind of right in question. For example, if private individuals are more directly involved, less discretion is typically permitted to the discretion of state parties. Naturally, that criterion comes under just one of the three criteria: the nature of the right, the aims pursued and the presence or absence of a European consensus, which are used to determine the scope of any given margin. As the European Court decided in Dickson v United Kingdom:

'Where, however, there is no consensus within the Member States of the Council of Europe, either as to the relative importance of the interest at stake or as to how best to protect it, the margin will be wider. This is particularly so where the case raises complex issues and choices of social strategy.... There will also usually be a wide margin accorded if the State is required to strike a balance between competing private and public interests or Convention rights.'

The margin of appreciation doctrine has gained sufficient prominence under an emerging principle of subsidiarity to merit its incorporation into the Preamble of the European Convention. That formal acknowledgment indicates awareness on the part of the Council of Europe that the evolution of the Convention must include jurisprudence that justifies the application of the doctrine in so many different issues. The margin of appreciation doctrine may also expand further throughout international law because its underlying concept of a derogation being "necessary in a democratic society", as is provided for in the European Convention, also resonates with other international human rights regimes. Although many regimes remain formally ambivalent or even negative towards margins of appreciation, the growing influence of Convention law on international norms, in turn, makes the doctrine more attractive to the global community.

== Review ==
The margin of appreciation doctrine has been analysed by the Inter-American Court of Human Rights (I/A Court H.R.). Former I/A Court H.R. judge Antônio Cançado Trindade describes it as follows:

The doctrine of the so-called 'margin of appreciation' flourished ... in the application of the European Convention [on] Human Rights, as a deference to the supposed 'wisdom' of the organs of the State [regarding] the best way to give effect to the decisions of the conventional protection bodies in the field of domestic law. This doctrine presupposes the existence of truly democratic states, with an undoubtedly autonomous judiciary ... This doctrine could only have developed in a European system of protection that was believed to be exemplary, typical of a Western Europe (before 1989) relatively homogeneous in terms of its perceptions of a common historical experience ... It can no longer be assumed, with the same apparent security of the past, that all the States that make up its regional protection system are true States of Law. Thus, the doctrine of 'margin of appreciation' requires serious reconsideration. Fortunately, this doctrine has not found an explicit parallel development in the jurisprudence under the American Convention on Human Rights.

== See also ==
- European Convention on Human Rights
- European Court of Human Rights
