= Redfearn v United Kingdom =

- Court: European Court of Human Rights
- Decided: 6 November 2012
- Citation: [2012] ECHR 1878

Case history
- Prior actions: [2006] EWCA Civ 659, [2006] IRLR 623

Keywords
- Indirect racial discrimination, belief discrimination

Redfearn v United Kingdom [2012] ECHR 1878 is a UK labour law and European Court of Human Rights case. It held that UK law was deficient in not allowing a potential claim based on discrimination for one's political belief. Before the case was decided, the Equality Act 2010 provided a remedy to protect political beliefs, though it had not come into effect when this case was brought.

== Facts ==
Arthur Redfearn, who is white, was a bus driver for Serco (starting December 2003), trading as West Yorkshire Transport Service, for Bradford City Council. Redfearn was disabled, drove a bus for disabled people, and had been nominated by an Asian supervisor for the award of “first-class employee”. He was elected as councillor for Bradford, representing the far right British National Party. The union had words with Redfearn, who said that on "health and safety" grounds he would be made redundant. The alleged idea was that in an area with large ethnic minority populations, his profile would make him a target for violent attacks, and that could make for an unsafe bus service. He was then dismissed by Serco on June 30, 2004. Redfearn alleged that he was being directly racially discriminated against under s 1(1)(a) of the Race Relations Act 1976, 'on racial grounds'. In previous cases, it had been held that this phrase should be construed widely. He said that where a person was subject to a detriment (here a dismissal) for a reason which involved race, that amounted to discrimination contrary to the Act

Redfearn lost at the Employment Tribunal, but succeeded at the Employment Appeal Tribunal, and Serco appealed to the Court of Appeal.

== Judgment ==
=== Court of Appeal ===
Mummery LJ held that the purpose of the race discrimination rules was to combat the state of mind that breeds intolerance, not protect it. The indirect discrimination claim was held to fail on the technical point of pleading. He pointed out the Tribunal had suggested a 'provision, criterion or practice' that would be complained of was banning anyone with BNP membership. But that was wrong, because there could be no non-white comparator, because only whites were allowed in. Mummery LJ said,

A more general and meaningful provision along similar lines would be one applying to membership of a political organisation like the BNP, which existed to promote views hostile to members of a different colour than those that belonged to the organisation. If such a provision were applied, however, it would not put persons of the same race as Mr Redfearn "at a particular disadvantage" when compared with other persons within section 1(1A) of the 1976 Act. All such political activists would be at the same disadvantage, whatever colour they were.

Therefore, it was unnecessary to consider a 'health and safety' justification, but if it had been considered, as the Tribunal did, then more scrutiny was probably needed.

Furthermore, there was no human rights claim for Redfearn. David Pannick QC, acting for Serco Ltd submitted correctly that Art 17 of the European Convention on Human Rights states that nothing in the Convention should allow rights for any group to engage in activity aimed at destroying Convention rights.

Dyson LJ and Sir Martin Nourse agreed.

Mr Redfearn applied to the European Court of Human Rights, alleging the decision violated his right to freedom of association, private life, and that he had been unequally treated.

=== European Court of Human Rights ===
The European Court of Human Rights held that Mr Redfearn's right to freedom of association has been infringed and violated, because the qualifying period of one year for unfair dismissal left no room for a claim that he was discriminated against on grounds of his political beliefs.

42 Although the essential object of Article 11 is to protect the individual against arbitrary interference by public authorities with the exercise of the rights protected, the national authorities may in certain circumstances be obliged to intervene in the relationships between private individuals by taking reasonable and appropriate measures to secure the effective enjoyment of the right to freedom of association (see, mutatis mutandis, Plattform "Ärzte für das Leben" v. Austria, 21 June 1988, §§ 32-34, Series A no. 139, Gustafsson v. Sweden, 25 April 1996, § 45, Reports of Judgments and Decisions 1996-II, and Fuentes Bobo v. Spain, no. 39293/98, § 38, 29 February 2000).

43 Therefore, although the matters about which the applicant complained did not involve direct intervention or interference by the State, the United Kingdom's responsibility will be engaged if these matters resulted from a failure on its part to secure to the applicant under domestic law his right to freedom of association. In other words there is also a positive obligation on the authorities to provide protection against dismissal by private employers where the dismissal is motivated solely by the fact that an employee belongs to a particular political party (or at least to provide the means whereby there can be an independent evaluation of the proportionality of such a dismissal in the light of all the circumstances of a given case).

44 The Court has recognised that in certain circumstances an employer may lawfully place restrictions on the freedom of association of employees where it is deemed necessary in a democratic society, for example to protect the rights of others or to maintain the political neutrality of civil servants (see, for example, Ahmed and Others v. the United Kingdom, 2 September 1998, § 63, Reports of Judgments and Decisions 1998-VI). In view of the nature of the BNP's policies (see paragraph 9, above), the Court recognises the difficult position that Serco may have found itself in when the applicant's candidature became public knowledge. In particular, it accepts that even in the absence of specific complaints from service users, the applicant's membership of the BNP could have impacted upon Serco's provision of services to Bradford City Council, especially as the majority of service users were vulnerable persons of Asian origin.

45 However, regard must also be had to the fact that the applicant was a "first-class employee" (see paragraph 7, above) and, prior to his political affiliation becoming public knowledge, no complaints had been made against him by service users or by his colleagues. Nevertheless, once he was elected as a local councillor for the BNP and complaints were received from unions and employees, he was summarily dismissed without any apparent consideration being given to the possibility of transferring him to a non-customer facing role. In this regard, the Court considers that the case can readily be distinguished from that of Stedman v. the United Kingdom (cited above), in which the applicant was dismissed because she refused to work the hours required by the post. In particular, the Court is struck by the fact that these complaints, as summarised in paragraph 10, were in respect of prospective problems and not in respect of anything that the applicant had done or had failed to do in the actual exercise of his employment.

46 Moreover, although the applicant was working in a non-skilled post which did not appear to have required significant training or experience (compare, for example, Vogt v Germany, 26 September 1995, Series A no. 323, and Pay v. the United Kingdom, no. 32792/05, 16 September 2008), at the date of his dismissal he was fifty-six years old and it is therefore likely that he would have experienced considerable difficulty finding alternative employment.

47 Consequently, the Court accepts that the consequences of his dismissal were serious and capable of striking at the very substance of his rights under Article 11 of the Convention (Sørensen and Rasmussen v. Denmark [GC], nos. 52562/99 and 52620/99, §§ 61 and 62, ECHR 2006-I and Young, James and Webster v United Kingdom, cited above, § 55). The Court must therefore determine whether in the circumstances of the applicant's case a fair balance was struck between the competing interests involved, namely the applicant's Article 11 right and the risk, if any, that his continued employment posed for fellow employees and service users. It is also to be borne in mind that what the Court is called upon to do in this case is not to pass judgment on the policies or aims, obnoxious or otherwise, of the BNP at the relevant time (the BNP is, in any case, not a party to these proceedings), but solely to determine whether the applicant's rights under Article 11 were breached in the particular circumstances of the instant case. In this connection it is also worth bearing in mind that, like the Front National-Nationaal Front in Féret v. Belgium (no. 15615/07, 16 July 2009) the BNP was not an illegal party under domestic law nor were its activities illegal (see, by way of contrast, Hizb Ut-Tahrir and Others v. Germany (dec.) no. 31098/08, 12 June 2012).

48 The Court has accepted that Contracting States cannot guarantee the effective enjoyment of the right to freedom of association absolutely (Plattform "Ärzte für das Leben" v. Austria, cited above, § 34). In the context of the positive obligation under Article 11, it has held that where sensitive social and political issues are involved in achieving a proper balance between the competing interests and, in particular, in assessing the appropriateness of State intervention, the Contracting States should enjoy a wide margin of appreciation in their choice of the means to be employed (Gustafsson v. Sweden, cited above, § 45).

49 Therefore, the principal question for the Court to consider is whether, bearing in mind the margin of appreciation afforded to the respondent State in this area, the measures taken by it could be described as "reasonable and appropriate" to secure the applicant's rights under Article 11 of the Convention (see, mutatis mutandis, Plattform "Ärzte für das Leben" v. Austria, cited above, §§ 32 - 34, Gustafsson v. Sweden, cited above, § 45, and Fuentes Bobo v. Spain, cited above, § 38).

50 In the opinion of the Court, a claim for unfair dismissal under the 1996 Act would be an appropriate domestic remedy for a person dismissed on account of his political beliefs or affiliations. Once such a claim is lodged with the Employment Tribunal, it falls to the employer to demonstrate that there was a "substantial reason" for the dismissal. Following the entry into force of the Human Rights Act 1998, the domestic courts would then have to take full account of Article 11 in deciding whether or not the dismissal was, in all the circumstances of the case, justified.

51 However, as the applicant had not been employed for the one-year qualifying period at the date of his dismissal, he was unable to benefit from this remedy. He therefore brought a race discrimination claim under the 1976 Act but this claim was rejected by the Court of Appeal, which found that he had not been discriminated against on account of his race. The Court observes that the 1976 Act is concerned only with direct and indirect race discrimination. Although it would not go so far as to state that it amounted to a wholly ineffective remedy - indeed, it recalls that the applicant's claim succeeded before the Employment Appeal Tribunal - the Court considers that the 1976 Act was not primarily intended to cover a situation such as the present one and a liberal interpretation of the relevant provisions was required in order for the domestic courts to find in the applicant's favour. Consequently, the Court does not consider that the 1976 Act offered the applicant any protection against the interference with his rights under Article 11 of the Convention.

52 There is therefore no doubt that the applicant suffered a detriment as a consequence of the one-year qualifying period as it deprived him of the only means by which he could effectively have challenged his dismissal at the domestic level on the ground that it breached his fundamental rights. It therefore falls to the Court to consider whether the respondent State, in including the one-year qualifying period in the 1996 Act, could be said to have taken reasonable and appropriate measures to protect the applicant's rights under Article 11.

53 The Court observes that the one-year qualifying period was included in the 1996 Act because the Government considered that the risks of unjustified involvement with tribunals in unfair dismissal cases and the cost of such involvement could deter employers from giving more people jobs. Thus, the purpose of the one-year qualifying period was to benefit the domestic economy by increasing labour demand. The Court has received no submissions on the length of the qualifying period but it accepts that one year would normally be a sufficient period for an employer to assess the suitability of an employee before he or she became well-established in a post. Consequently, in view of the margin of appreciation afforded to Contracting States in formulating and implementing social and economic policies, the Court considers that it was in principle both reasonable and appropriate for the respondent State to bolster the domestic labour market by preventing new employees from bringing unfair dismissal claims.

54 However, it observes that in practice the one-year qualifying period did not apply equally to all dismissed employees. Rather, a number of exceptions were created to offer additional protection to employees dismissed on certain prohibited grounds, such as race, sex and religion, but no additional protection was afforded to employees who were dismissed on account of their political opinion or affiliation.

55 The Court has previously held that political parties are a form of association essential to the proper functioning of democracy (United Communist Party of Turkey v Turkey, 30 January 1998, § 25, Reports of Judgments and Decisions 1998-I). In view of the importance of democracy in the Convention system, the Court considers that in the absence of judicial safeguards a legal system which allows dismissal from employment solely on account of the employee's membership of a political party carries with it the potential for abuse.

56 Even if the Court were to acknowledge the legitimacy of Serco's interest in dismissing the applicant from its workforce having regard to the nature of his political beliefs, the policies pursued by the BNP and his public identification with those policies through his election as a councillor, the fact remains that Article 11 is applicable not only to persons or associations whose views are favourably received or regarded as inoffensive or as a matter of indifference, but also those whose views offend, shock or disturb (see, mutatis mutandis, Handyside v United Kingdom, 7 December 1976, § 49, Series A no. 24, and Jersild v Denmark, 23 September 1994, § 37, Series A no. 298). For the Court, what is decisive in such cases is that the domestic courts or tribunals be allowed to pronounce on whether or not, in the circumstances of a particular case, the interests of the employer should prevail over the Article 11 rights asserted by the employee, regardless of the length of the latter's period of employment.

57 Consequently, the Court considers that it was incumbent on the respondent State to take reasonable and appropriate measures to protect employees, including those with less than one year's service, from dismissal on grounds of political opinion or affiliation, either through the creation of a further exception to the one-year qualifying period or through a free-standing claim for unlawful discrimination on grounds of political opinion or affiliation. As the United Kingdom legislation is deficient in this respect, the Court concludes that the facts of the present case give rise to a violation of Article 11 of the Convention.

Three judges dissented.

3. Where we part company with the majority is in the broad assertion in the judgment that, even within the qualifying period, there exists a positive obligation on the authorities under the Convention "to provide protection against dismissal by private employers where the dismissal is motivated solely by the fact that an employer belongs to a particular political party (or at least to provide the means whereby there can be an independent evaluation of the proportionality of such a dismissal in the light of all the circumstances of a given case)" (paragraph 43). In this regard reliance is placed by the majority on the fact that in the United Kingdom the qualifying period is not absolute, certain exceptions having been created in the case, inter alia, of claims by an employee that he has been dismissed on grounds of race, sex or religion but that no exception has been made in the case of a claim of dismissal on grounds of political opinion. It is argued that it is incumbent on the United Kingdom to protect employees, including those with less than one year's service, from dismissal on grounds of political opinion, either through the creation of a further exception to the one-year qualifying period or through the creation of a free-standing claim for unlawful discrimination on grounds of political opinion.

4. We are unable to accept the argument that, having created certain exceptions to the requirement of employment for the qualifying period, the State was obliged to create a further exception in the case of dismissal on grounds of political opinion, still less that the Convention imposes a positive obligation to create a free-standing cause of action, without any temporal limitation. This, in our view, is to press the positive obligation too far. In a complex area of social and economic policy, it is in our view pre-eminently for Parliament to decide what areas require special protection in the field of employment and the consequent scope of any exception created to the general rule. The choice of Parliament of race, sex and religion as grounds requiring special protection can in no sense be seen as random or arbitrary. In this respect we attach importance to the fact that certain grounds of difference of treatment have traditionally been treated by the Court itself as "suspect" and as requiring very weighty reasons by way of justification. These grounds include differences of treatment on grounds of race (D.H. and others v the Czech Republic [GC] no. 57325/10, ECHR 2007), sex (Abdulaziz, Cabales and Balkandali v the United Kingdom, 28 May 1985, Series A No. 94), religion (Hoffmann v Austria, 23 June 1993, Series A no. 94) and nationality and ethnicity (Timishev v Russia, nos. 55762/00 and 55974/00, ECHR 2005-XII). In addition, the Court has indicated that differences of treatment which are based on immutable characteristics will as a general rule require weightier reasons in justification than differences of treatment based on a characteristic or status which contains an element of choice (Bah v the United Kingdom, no. 56328/07, 27 September 2011).

5. Doubtless the balance could have been struck by the legislator in a different way and further exceptions to the qualifying period might have been created to cover claims for dismissal of other grounds, including that of political opinion or political affiliation. However, this is a different question from the one which the Court is required to determine, namely whether the United Kingdom exceeded its wide margin of appreciation in not extending the list of exceptions or in not creating a free-standing cause of action covering dismissal on grounds of such opinion or affiliation.

6. Since, for the reasons given above, we see a justification for treating differently the comparators relied on by the applicant under Article 14, we have voted in favour of the conclusion in the judgment that it is not necessary to examine separately whether there was also a violation of Article 14 read in conjunction with Article 11.

== Significance ==
The effect of the Court of Appeal decision appeared to be that any employer may pursue a workplace equality policy that results in refusal to hire staff who belong to political or religious groups whose aim is to undermine the fundamental rights set forth in the ECHR. However, the European Court of Human Rights decision casts doubt on any ability to simply dismiss a person because of their political beliefs. In particular, the use of a qualifying period for the ERA 1996 right to dismiss a person was held to be inadequate. A proposal to remedy this was put forward by the Government in the Enterprise and Regulatory Reform Bill. This provision is now contained as an automatically unfair reason for dismissal in the ERA 1996, and does not require compliance with a qualifying period to be asserted. On the contrary, the affected worker may bring a claim since the first day of employment if there was a dismissal on these grounds.

== See also ==
- Employment discrimination law in the UK
- Eweida v United Kingdom [2009] IRLR 78 (EAT) (costs capping order refused in [2009] EWCA Civ 1025)
