= Article 9 of the European Convention on Human Rights =

Article 9 of the European Convention on Human Rights provides a right to freedom of thought, conscience, and religion. This includes the freedom to change a religion or belief, and to manifest a religion or belief in worship, teaching, practice and observance, subject to certain restrictions that are "in accordance with law" and "necessary in a democratic society".

== Article text ==
Article 9 – Freedom of thought, conscience and religion

1. Everyone has the right to freedom of thought, conscience and religion; this right includes freedom to change her/his religion or belief and freedom, either alone or in community with others and in public or private, to manifest her/his religion or belief, in worship, teaching, practice and observance.
2. Freedom to manifest one's religion or beliefs shall be subject only to such limitations as are prescribed by law and are necessary in a democratic society in the interests of public safety, for the protection of public order, health or morals, or for the protection of the rights and freedoms of others.

=== Structure ===
Article 9 protects two distinct rights, which the European Court of Human Rights treats differently. The first is the right to hold a thought, conscience or religious belief, including the right to change one's beliefs. The Court has described this aspect as absolute and unconditional: the State cannot dictate what a person believes or take coercive steps to make them change their beliefs. The second is the right to manifest a belief, alone or with others, in worship, teaching, practice and observance. This aspect is qualified, meaning it may be subject to limitations under the conditions set out in Article 9(2).

For a personal or collective conviction to come within the scope of Article 9, it must attain a certain level of cogency, seriousness, cohesion and importance. The Court has applied this test to recognise a wide range of religious and non-religious convictions, including atheism and pacifism.

Where an interference with the right to manifest a belief is alleged, the Court applies a structured test, which is similar to the test used under Articles 8, 10. The interference must be prescribed by law, pursue one of the legitimate aims listed under Article 9(2) and be necessary in a democratic society. The legitimate aims are public safety, the protection of public order, health or morals, or the protection of the rights and freedoms of others. Yet, unlike Articles 8, 10 and 11, the list in Article 9(2) does not include national security.

== History ==
- Cuius regio, eius religio was a principle of European international law, beginning in the 16th century in the wake of the Protestant Reformation, that established freedom of religion for states, but not individuals.
- The First Amendment to the United States Constitution was one of the first legal protections for freedom of religion without reference to any specific religion.
- Article X of the French Declaration of the Rights of Man and of the Citizen, which influenced the European Convention, declares freedom of religious opinion as a universal right.

== Case law ==
- European Court of Human Rights:
  - Buscarini and Others v. San Marino (requirement of religious oaths for public office not permitted)
  - Kokkinakis v. Greece (criminalization of proselytism, as defined in Greek law, permitted)
  - Leyla Şahin v. Turkey (university ban on Islamic headscarf permitted)
  - Pichon and Sajous v. France (no right to refuse supply of contraceptives on religious grounds)
  - Leela Förderkreis E.V. and Others v. Germany (regarding state information campaigns about a religious movement)
  - Universelles Leben e.V. v. Germany (regarding state information campaigns about a religious movement)
  - Lautsi v. Italy (legal requirement to display a crucifix in school classrooms permitted)
  - S.A.S. v. France (French ban on face coverings permitted)
  - Osmanoğlu and Kocabaş v. Switzerland (permitted to require children to participate in mixed swimming lessons and enforce this through fines)
  - Executief van de Moslims van België and Others v. Belgium (bans on ritual slaughter without prior stunning permitted)
- High Court of England and Wales:
  - Connolly v DPP (no ground for appeal under Article 9 against conviction for sending indecent or grossly offensive material, namely images of aborted foetuses)

== See also ==
- European Convention on Human Rights

== Literature ==
- Murdoch J. Freedom of thought, conscience and religion. A guide to the implementation of Article 9 of the European Convention on Human Rights Strasbourg, Council of Europe, 2007
- Freedom of religion, a factsheet of ECtHR case law
- The Protections for Religious Rights: Law and Practice, a textbook on Article 9 and international law on the right to freedom of thought, conscience and religion
