= Peruzzi (disambiguation) =

Peruzzi may refer to:

- Peruzzi, family of bankers of Florence
- Peruzzi (singer), Nigerian singer and songwriter
- Peruzzi v. Italy, a decision made by the European Court of Human Rights
- Angelo Peruzzi, Italian football goalkeeper
- Baldassare Peruzzi, a leading Italian architect of the earlier 16th century
- Gino Peruzzi, an Argentine footballer
- Giovanni Sallustio Peruzzi, an Italian architect
- Meredith Peruzzi, American museum director
- Ubaldino Peruzzi, an Italian politician of the Kingdom of Sardinia and the Kingdom of Italy
