= Right to Life UK =

Anti-abortion charitable organisation

- Formation: 8 September 2003; 22 years ago
- Headquarters: Westminster, London, United Kingdom
- CEO: Alisdair Hungerford-Morgan
- Director of Public Affairs: Rupert Evans
- Director of Finance and Operations: Lally Mostyn
- Website: https://righttolife.org.uk/

Right to Life UK is a charitable organisation focused on opposing abortion, euthanasia, assisted suicide, and embryo research in the United Kingdom.

== History ==
Right to Life UK was formally established as "The Right to Life Charitable Trust" and registered with the Charity Commission for England and Wales on 8 September 2003 (Charity No. 1099319). It emerged within the context of the UK’s anti-abortion movement, which gained momentum following the passage of the Abortion Act 1967, a law that legalised abortion in Great Britain.

Founded by Phyllis Bowman, a prominent campaigner against abortion since before 1967, the organisation aims to continue her work, building on the efforts of earlier organizations such as the Society for the Protection of Unborn Children (SPUC, founded 1967, also by Phyllis Bowman) and Life (founded 1970). Right to Life UK engages in advocacy through media, political engagement, and grassroots activities across England, Wales, Scotland, and Northern Ireland. It provides the secretariat for the All-Party Parliamentary Pro-Life Group.

== Campaigns ==
=== Opposition to abortion law changes ===
Right to Life UK has actively opposed efforts to decriminalize abortion or extend abortion access. In 2023, it coordinated a lobbying campaign encouraging supporters to contact MPs to tighten abortion laws. A joint investigation by The Observer and The Citizens reported that the organization spent £117,000 on Facebook ads in 2023, up from £11,400 in 2020, with ads often featuring images of fetuses or premature babies. These ads included a petition to criminalize sex-selective abortion and information about telemedicine abortion risks. In June 2025, it campaigned against an amendment by Labour MP Tonia Antoniazzi to the Criminal Justice Bill, which proposed allowing abortion up to birth, arguing it endangered women and babies. The amendment passed with a vote of 379 to 137 after limited debate.

=== Reinstatement of in-person abortion consultations ===
The organization supported an amendment (NC106) by MP Caroline Johnson to the Criminal Justice Bill to reinstate in-person consultations for abortions, citing risks of late-term home abortions due to telemedicine. It urged supporters to contact MPs before a vote on 17 June 2025, claiming the policy endangered women by removing gestational age verification.

=== Opposition to assisted suicide ===
Right to Life UK has campaigned against the Terminally Ill Adults (End of Life) Bill, particularly the Leadbeater assisted suicide bill, encouraging public petitions to MPs to oppose it before its third reading on 20 June 2025. It criticized MP Kim Leadbeater for not distancing herself from extreme assisted suicide measures, such as Sarco suicide pods, and for comments perceived as endorsing couple suicides, raising concerns about potential abuse.

=== Support for anti-abortion bills ===
In November 2023, Right to Life UK supported Baroness O’Loan’s bill to reduce the abortion time limit from 24 to 22 weeks, citing advancements in medical science since the time limit was last reduced from 28 to 24 weeks in 1990, influenced by a Royal College of Obstetricians and Gynaecologists report on neonatal survival. The organization referenced British Association of Perinatal Medicine guidance allowing intervention to save babies from 22 weeks and a 2024 study by the University of Leicester and Imperial College London, which found a tripling of survival rates for babies born at 22 weeks between 2018–19 and 2020–21. Catherine Robinson, spokesperson for Right to Life UK, stated, “Our 24-week limit is out of line with the majority of European Union countries, where the most common time limit for abortion on demand or on broad social grounds is 12 weeks gestation,” and called the bill “a clear step in the right direction to offer more protection to the most vulnerable among us.” She noted that in 2020–21, 261 babies born alive at 22–23 weeks survived to hospital discharge, while 1,054 abortions occurred at the same gestational age in 2021, highlighting a “contradiction” in UK law.

In November 2023, Right to Life UK supported a bill introduced by Baroness Eaton in the House of Lords to commission a review of the risks associated with at-home medical abortions, particularly those facilitated through telemedicine under the “pills by post” scheme introduced during the COVID-19 pandemic. The organization argued that telemedicine abortions, which allow women to take abortion pills at home following remote consultations, pose significant health risks due to the lack of in-person gestational age verification and assessment for coercion. Right to Life UK cited a November 2023 government review highlighting that complication rates for medical abortions at 20 weeks and over are 160.33 times higher than at 2–9 weeks, and referenced cases like that of Carla Foster, who was convicted for a late-term abortion at 32–34 weeks after obtaining pills via telemedicine. The bill aimed to evaluate these risks to inform future policy but did not progress due to the dissolution of Parliament for a general election in 2024.

In November 2023, Right to Life UK endorsed a bill introduced by Lord Moylan in the House of Lords to establish a parliamentary committee to investigate fetal sentience, focusing on the capacity of fetuses to experience pain and consciousness. The organization supported the bill by citing studies, such as a 2020 review in the Journal of Medical Ethics, suggesting evidence of fetal pain perception as early as 12 weeks gestation, which they argued necessitates greater legal protections. Right to Life UK framed the proposed committee as a means to update abortion policy in light of scientific advancements, aligning with their broader advocacy for reducing abortion time limits. The bill did not advance due to the dissolution of Parliament for a general election in 2024.

=== Opposition to abortion clinic buffer zones ===
Right to Life UK opposed the implementation of buffer zones around abortion clinics, introduced under the Public Order Act 2023, effective 31 October 2024. These zones prohibit protests or activities deemed to “intentionally or recklessly influence” within a 150-meter radius of abortion services, with violators facing unlimited fines. Catherine Robinson, spokesperson for Right to Life UK, stated, “The implementation of buffer zones next month will mean that vital practical support provided by volunteers outside abortion clinics, which helps to provide a genuine choice, and offers help to women who may be undergoing coercion, will be removed,” arguing that the zones criminalize support for women facing unplanned pregnancies. The organization highlighted cases like Isabel Vaughan-Spruce, arrested for silent prayer and awarded £13,000 for wrongful arrest, and Livia Tossici-Bolt, convicted in 2025 for breaching a buffer zone with a sign offering conversation. The campaign “Be Here For Me” was launched, featuring testimonies from women who received support from pro-life volunteers outside clinics.
