= Barfod v. Denmark =

1989 case of the European Court of Human Rights

Submitted October 16 1987 Decided February 22 1989
- Full case name: Barfod v. Denmark
- Case: 11508/85
- Case type: Free Speech
- Chamber: the Convention for the Protection of Human Rights and Fundamental Freedoms ("the Convention")
- Language of proceedings: English
- Nationality of parties: Danish

Ruling
- Was not a violation of Amendment 10

Court composition
- President; Rolv Ryssdal
- Judges: John Cremona; Denise Bindschedler-Robert; Feyyaz Gölcüklü; Franz Matscher; Brian Walsh; Bernhard Gomard

Barfod v. Denmark (1989), was a case decided by the European Court of Human Rights ruling against Barfod in his accusation that the Danish government was not protecting his freedom of expression when writing an article suggesting that the judges who ruled in a specific case were incompetent to make fair and just decisions. The defendant was convicted on the basis that he wrote in the publication “Grønland Dansk” that two of the judges who, were deciding in a case regarding taxation of Danish nationals working on a base in Greenland, were biased in deciding the case. Mr. Barfod wrote, “Most of the Local Government’s members could ... afford the time to watch that the two Greenland lay judges - who are by the way both employed directly by the Local Government, as director of a museum and as consultant in urban housing affairs - did their duty, and this they did. The vote was two to one in favor of the Local Government and with such a bench of judges it does not require much imagination to guess who voted how." This accusation was seen as a potential for damage to their reputation therefore “the applicant was subsequently charged with defamation of character within the meaning of Article 71(1) of the Greenland Penal Code before the District Court of Narssaq” This case was then appealed and brought to the High Court for Eastern Denmark to then eventually be brought before the High Court of Greenland as it more formally fit the case. They once again did not side with Mr. Barfod. On October 16, 1987 the case was brought to the European Court of Human Rights. In a 6 to 1 decision the court found that there was no violation to Mr. Barfod’s right to freedom of speech.

== Background ==
In 1979 the local government in Greenland decided to tax Danish citizens who were employed on an American base in Greenland. This created much pushback from people who were affected by this taxation as they felt “that the decision was illegal on the grounds, inter alia, that they did not have the right to vote in local elections in Greenland and did not receive any benefits from the Greenland authorities”. Three judges heard the case and, “in its judgment of 28 January 1981… the High Court unanimously found for the Local Government; this judgment was subsequently upheld by the High Court for Eastern Denmark on 8 September 1983”. After this decision was made, Mr. Barfod wrote an opinion piece in ‘Grønland Dansk’ criticizing the judge’s rulings. He stated that, "most of the Local Government’s members could ... afford the time to watch that the two Greenland lay judges - who are by the way both employed directly by the Local Government, as director of a museum and as consultant in urban housing affairs - did their duty, and this they did. The vote was two to one in favor of the Local Government and with such a bench of judges it does not require much imagination to guess who voted how." After his words were published, he was charged with defamation of character. On December 9, 1983, the hearings for the case started and this is where Mr. Barfod confirmed that he in fact made these remarks. The court convicted him and charged him 2000 Danish Kroner. This is where Mr. Barfod appealed his case to the High Court for Eastern Denmark, when was then turned over to the High Court of Greenland. The decision was upheld as it states here in the Greenland Penal Code.

“17. The crime of defamation of character is defined in Article 71 of the Greenland Penal Code (Kriminalloven for Grønland), which provides (translation from Danish) (1) "Any person shall be liable to punishment for defamation of character if he degrades the honour of another person through insulting words or acts or if he makes or disseminates an accusation which is likely to damage the esteem in which the insulted party is held by his fellow citizens or which may in other ways damage his relationship with other people. (2) However, no person may be convicted on the ground of an accusation which is proved true or has been made in good faith, if the perpetrator was under an obligation to make the statement or acted in order to safeguard, justifiably, an evident public interest or his own or another’s interest. (3) A person making an accusation supported by evidence may nevertheless be convicted if the wording of the accusation is unduly insulting or if the perpetrator had no reasonable cause to make the accusation. (4) Whenever a defamatory accusation is unwarranted, the insulted party may call for a statement to this effect to be included in the conclusions of the judgment."

By these statues Mr. Barfod was not having his freedom of speech right be taken away, because he violated the Greenland Penal Code. He then brought this case to the European Court of Human Rights, as he believed his freedom of speech was not being protected by the decision made in the courts.

== Judgement ==
=== Majority Opinion ===
In the final decision the court, concluded with a 6 to 1 vote stating, "there was no violation of Article 10". This case was heard by judges, Mr. J. Cremona, Mrs. D. Bindschedler-Robert, Mr. F. Gölcüklü, Mr. F. Matscher, Mr. B. Walsh and Mr. B. Gomard in the city of Strasbourg and a decision was made in February 1989. It was stated in the case, "The Court cannot accept this argument. The lay judges exercised judicial functions. The impugned statement was not a criticism of the reasoning in the judgment of 28 January 1981, but rather, as found by the High Court in its judgment of 3 July 1984, a defamatory accusation against the lay judges personally, which was likely to lower them in public esteem and was put forward without any supporting evidence (see paragraph 13 above). In view of these considerations, the political context in which the tax case was fought cannot be regarded as relevant for the question of proportionality". Due to the fact that Mr. Barfod allegedly attacked the judges' personally, which could ruin their reputation and call into question their credibility, he was charged with the crime.

=== Dissenting Opinion ===
Judge Gölcüklü dissented on this case. His reasoning for disagreeing with the decision states,

"With the greatest respect for the opinion of the majority of my colleagues, I regret that I am unable to agree with the conclusion which the Court has reached in this case. My view is based on the following considerations: 1. In the article giving rise to the case, the applicant called in question the impartiality of the two lay judges, both employees of the Local Government, in proceedings instituted against "their employer". In support of this position he cited Article 62 of the Danish Constitution. 2. Since he was not a party to, nor had any direct or indirect personal interest in the initial proceedings, in which the Government was defendant, Mr Barfod had no motive for attacking the two lay judges individually. He called in question their impartiality not by criticising their actual conduct in the proceedings concerned, but by attacking the fact that they were government officials, in other words the fact that they were government employees sitting in a court which was supposed to be independent and impartial"

He agrees with Mr. Barfod in the fact that the judges might have had motivation for the decision they made regarding the initial taxation case when he says, "Although these two lay judges were not strictly speaking politicians, I consider that this case has political overtones inasmuch as it involved criticism of a specific judicial system, namely the Greenland judiciary and its composition, which, in the applicant’s view, did not inspire public confidence". In his dissent he cites Article 62 of the Danish Constitution which states, "Den dømmende magts udøvelse kan kun ordnes ved lov. Særdomstole med dømmende myndighed kan ikke nedsættes" (This translates to, the administration of justice shall remain separated from the Executive and the rules in this respect shall be laid down by law). He also speaks upon the fact that what Mr. Barfod has said, is more aggressive, but similar to what the courts have admits to happening with these judges and how they probably should have stepped down as he stated,

"I consider that what Mr Barfod said, admittedly in somewhat crude and extreme terms, was no different to what was, is or has been stated: by the Supreme Court of Greenland - which agreed with him that the two lay judges "ought ... to have considered themselves as disqualified and thus refrained from participating in the case" and that "the accused was correct in drawing attention to this" because they were "employed in leading positions by the defendant party" (judgment, para. 13); in Article 62 of the Danish Constitution and by the Danish Government - who "agree ... that the two lay judges to whom the applicant referred in his statement, as employed in leading positions by the defendant party, should have refrained from sitting because this relationship might raise doubt as to their impartiality" (report, para. 42); by this Court, on more than one occasion, in its judgments, when it has held that: Justice must not only be done, it must also be seen to be done".

He disagrees with the notion that Mr. Barfod caused defamation of character because in his opinion he thought Mr. Barfod was not attacking them in their ability to judge but instead just in this particular decision.

== Media/Criticism ==
In an article on lawteacher.net it was said, "The case of Barfod v Denmark does show that the court may provide a lesser level of protection to the press". This is just one example of how the court protected the judges and not the freedom on speech, which is supposed to be protected under Article 10. This was an article on human rights law in European courts.

In the book Political Libels: A Comparative Study, it states, "The ECtHR took a markedly less protective attitude towards freedom of 'political' expression in Barfod v. Denmark... The ECtHR's judgment was brief and not clearly reasoned". There was again criticism to this case with the judgement that was given and the reasoning as to why his freedom of speech was taken away.

== Comparative Cases ==
The decision in the case of Barfod v. Denmark had a similar outcome to that of the US case Murphy v. Boston Herald. In Murphy v. Boston Herald it dealt with alleged defamation to a judge, which also happened in the Barfod case. In the US case, it was ruled in favor of Murphy, the judge, as stated, "The jury's verdict in this case reflects their conclusion that Wedge and the Herald defamed the plaintiff, and that they did so with actual malice and an awareness that they were enabling a campaign by the district attorney for the Bristol district to discredit the plaintiff by attacking the core attributes a judge must possess — even temperament, lack of any bias, fairness at all times, and a particular sensitivity to the plight of victims of crimes". Similarly to the Barfod case the judges sided with the judges who were allegedly defamed over the freedom of speech and expression.
