= Phyllis Bowman =

British journalist and pro-life campaigner (1926–2012)

Phyllis Bowman DSG
- Born: Phyllis Joyce Garnett; 14 March 1926; Bournemouth, Hampshire, England
- Died: 7 May 2012 (aged 86); Hammersmith, London, England
- Years active: 1943–2012
- Spouse: Stanley Gerald Moore Bowman (d 1967) Jeremiah Augustine Canty (m. 1976)

Phyllis Joyce Bowman DSG (14 March 1926 – 7 May 2012) was a British journalist and anti-abortion, anti-euthanasia (pro-life) campaigner.

== Early life and career ==
Bowman was born on 14 March 1926 in Bournemouth, Hampshire, England. Daughter of Maurice Garnett and Ethel Elizabeth (Ottalangui) Court, she began her career as a journalist on London's Fleet Street.

== Advocacy ==
Bowman was one of the founders of the Society for the Protection of Unborn Children, which describes itself as the "oldest pro-life campaigning and educational organisation in the world". A stone's throw from the Houses of Parliament, the Wig and Pen club was the venue for a meeting attended by Bowman which culminated in the founding of the organisation on 11 January 1967. Bowman was SPUC's National Director from the early 1970s until she stepped down from this role in 1996. She continued working for SPUC until an internal disagreement resulted in her resignation from the organisation, to the dismay of the All-Party Parliamentary Pro-Life Group, a cross-Party organisation of MPs and Peers.

Following her acrimonious split from the organisation she helped found, Bowman began a new organisation, Right To Life UK, to work closely with Parliamentarians of all Political Parties to pursue her aims.

=== Prosecution ===
Bowman was prosecuted under the Representation of the People Act 1983 section 75 for the offence of spending more than £5 on publications aiming to promote a candidate six weeks before an election, without authorisation. She was acquitted because the summons was issued out of time. However, Bowman contended at the European Court of Human Rights that her prosecution was an unjustifiable interference with her freedom of expression under the European Convention on Human Rights, article 10.

Bowman v United Kingdom [1998] ECHR 4 is a UK constitutional law case, concerning the legitimate limits on campaign finance spending. She won her case and in response to this judgment, the spending limit of £5 per individual was increased to £500 (for Parliamentary elections) in the Political Parties, Elections and Referendums Act 2000.

== Personal life ==
Bowman was not religious in her early life. She was Jewish by birth, then agnostic when she began her work for the pro-life cause, having previously been in favour of abortion. After a number of years of being involved in anti-abortion campaigns, she discovered Christianity and subsequently converted to Catholicism. She was named a Dame of the Order of St Gregory the Great (DSG) in 1996 by Pope John Paul II.
