= S.A.S. v. France =

European Court of Human Rights case

S.A.S. v. France was a case brought before the European Court of Human Rights which ruled by a vote of fifteen to two that the French ban on face covering did not violate European Convention on Human Rights's (ECHR) provisions on right to privacy or freedom of religion. The two judges in the minority expressed their partly dissenting opinion. The Court was unanimous in dismissing other related claims of the plaintiff, S.A.S.

The French ban against face covering, loi n° 2010-1192 du 11 octobre 2010 interdisant la dissimulation du visage dans l'espace public, was adopted on 11 October 2010 and went into effect on 11 April 2011. While the law bans all kinds of face covering, it was generally understood to especially aim at banning the niqab and burqa.

On the same day the law came into force, a French woman born in 1990 of Pakistani origin, referred to as S.A.S., filed a complaint against the French state as the law prevented her from wearing the niqab in public places.

The woman argued that the law violated Articles 3 (against inhuman or degrading treatment or punishment), 8 (on the right to privacy), 9 (on the freedom of religion), 10 (on the right to freedom of expression), 11 (on the right to freedom of assembly), and 14 (which prohibits discrimination in relation to protection of rights) of the ECHR.

On their side, the French state argued, with regard to Articles 8 and 9, that the exceptions in paragraph 2 of these articles applied. Paragraph 2 of Article 9 allows limitations on the right to religion if the limitations "are prescribed by law and are necessary in a democratic society in the interests of public safety, for the protection of public order, health or morals, or for the protection of the rights and freedoms of others." Specifically, France invoked three grounds for limiting the right to wear burqa: "respect for equality between men and women", "respect for human dignity" and "respect for the minimum requirements of life in society".

The court did not uphold the French government's position that the ban was valid due to gender equality or human dignity concerns, but accepted that France's claim that a ban was necessary for "living together" harmoniously was within law. It underlined that the states had a wide margin of appreciation in cases like this.

== Background ==
In June 2009, the French parliament set down a bipartisan commission to report on the use of the full veil in France. The report was finished in January 2010 and estimated that as of 2009 there were about 1,900 women wearing such veils in France, up from almost none in 2000. The report argued that the wearing of full-face veils went against the French republican values of Liberté, égalité, fraternité, saying that wearing of the veil was to be considered a sign of submission, which violated the ideals of liberty and gender equality, while also violating the principle of fraternity by hampering ordinary social contact. The report therefore argued that the full-face veil negated the French principle of "living together" (le vivre ensemble). It made several proposals to counter the use of the veil in France, but stopped short of proposing a full ban.

Also in January 2010, the National Consultative Commission on Human Rights (CNCDH) issued an opinion against a ban of the full-veil, arguing that the principle of secularity (laïcité) did not provide enough reasons for a total ban and that a ban might stigmatize Muslims generally and make life more difficult for women who wore the veil.

Prime Minister François Fillon on 29 January 2010 ordered the Council of State to carry out a study on the legal possibilities for banning the veil specifically or face-covering generally. The Council presented its study in March 2010, saying that it discouraged a ban specifically targeting religious veils; and that a ban on face-covering in general ought to be limited to situations where identification was necessary for security reasons or other specific reasons.

The government, however, found that a limited ban on face-covering was not practical, and in May 2010 proposed a bill on "prohibiting the concealment of one's face in public places" which would apply to all kinds of face-covering in public spheres.

The law was passed with one vote opposed in the National Assembly in July 2010 and passed unanimously in the Senate in September 2010. The Constitutional Council considered the law and found that it did not violate the French Constitution, and the law was adopted on 11 October 2010.

On 11 April 2011, a French woman referred to as S.A.S., who regularly wore a full-face veil, lodged an application with the European Court of Human Rights against the French state, claiming that the law violated several of her human rights according to the European Convention on Human Rights (ECHR).

The application was assigned to the Chamber of the Fifth Section, which in May 2013 declined to rule on it, in favour of the Grand Chamber.

In another case regarding the law, where a woman appealed an order to take a citizenship course for having worn a full veil, the French Court of Cassation in March 2013 found that the law did not violate ECHR and declined the appeal.

A hearing before the Grand Chamber took place on 27 November 2013, with representatives from the French government, the applicant, and one representative from the Belgian government. Belgium had passed a similar ban in July 2011. The Belgian Court of Cassation ruled in December 2012 that the ban did not violate human rights.

Written comments were given by the organizations Amnesty International, Liberty, Open Society Justice Initiative, and Article 19, along with Human Rights Centre of Ghent University and the Belgian Government.

== The law ==
The relevant sections of the law read:

Section 1

No one may, in public places, wear clothing that is designed to conceal the face.

Section 2

1. For the purposes of section 1 hereof, 'public places' comprise the public highway and any places open to the public or assigned to a public service.
2. The prohibition provided for in section 1 hereof shall not apply if the clothing is prescribed or authorised by primary or secondary legislation, if it is justified for health or occupational reasons, or if it is worn in the context of sports, festivities or artistic or traditional events.

Section 3

Any breach of the prohibition laid down in section 1 hereof shall be punishable by a fine, at the rate applying to second-class petty offences (contraventions) [150 euros maximum].

An obligation to follow a citizenship course, as provided at paragraph 8 of Article 131-16 of the Criminal Code, may be imposed in addition to or instead of the payment of a fine.

== The decision ==
The French government claimed that S.A.S could not be considered a victim within the meaning of the convention's Article 34 which says any persons who claim to be a victim of a violation of the convention can put forward an application to the Court. They questioned how important the full veil was for her religious practice, given that she only wore the veil at certain occasions and not at other, and underlined that she had never been stopped by the police. S.A.S argued that she was a potential victim as a devout Muslim and said the possibility of wearing a full veil was important to her. The court stated that while protection after Article 9 on religious freedom required a certain level of seriousness and cohesion, a state could not overrule which religious practices a person considered important; and underlined that a manifestation of religion did not need to be mandatory within a religion to be protected. The court further expressed that a person can be considered a victim if they need to modify their behaviour to avoid risk of prosecution, or belonged to a group that risks being directly affected by the law, and found this applied to S.A.S. Her claim of being a victim was therefore accepted by the court.

As the Court found that S.A.S. had a legitimate claim even though she had not been subject to any concrete reactions or punishment by French authorities, it rejected the French government's claim that the case should be dismissed due to non-exhaustion of domestic remedies. The Court noted that the Court of Cassation had upheld the law as not violating the Convention in another case in 2013.

The claims by S.A.S that the law violated the ban against torture or degrading treatment per the convention's Article 3 and the right to freedom of association per Article 11 were found manifestly ill-founded by the Court and thus this part of the application was found inadmissible per the convention's Article 35. The complaint regarding violation of article 8 on privacy, article 9 on religious freedom and article 10 on freedom of expression was declared admissible.

=== Articles 8 on privacy and 9 on religious freedom ===
The Court treated the complaints regarding Article 8 on the right to privacy and Article 9 on the right to religious freedom simultaneously. It found that the ban of the full-face veil represented an "interference" with or a "limitation" of the exercise of both these two rights, but put the emphasis on Article 9 as it found the right of religious freedom to represent the core of the case.

After having concluded that the ban interfered with the right to religious freedom (as well as the right to privacy) per the first paragraph of these articles, it went on to discuss whether the interference could be legitimate per the second paragraph of Article 9 (and an almost similar paragraph in Article 8) which states that the freedom can be subject to "such limitations as are prescribed by law and are necessary in a democratic society in the interests of public safety, for the protection of public order, health or morals, or for the protection of the rights and freedoms of others".

The French government's claim that a ban of the use full-face veils was necessary for public safety was not found valid by the Court as it argued public safety concerns could be addressed by more limited restrictions which the Court had previously accepted; for instance the obligation to show the face for identification purposes in certain circumstances.

The French government further claimed that a ban was necessary for "the protection of the rights and freedoms of others" within the meaning of the second paragraph of Articles 8 and 9. Specifically the Government claimed it was necessary "to ensure respect for the minimum set of values of an open and democratic society" and named three values "respect for equality between men and women", "respect for human dignity" and "respect for the minimum requirements of life in society".

Here the Court found that "respect for equality between men and women" and "respect for human dignity" could not be considered "protection of the rights and freedoms of others". Regarding the gender equality argument the Court wrote "a State Party cannot invoke gender equality in order to ban a practice that is defended by women – such as the applicant – in the context of the exercise of the rights enshrined in those provisions, unless it were to be understood that individuals could be protected on that basis from the exercise of their own fundamental rights and freedoms."

In contrast, the Court found that "respect for the minimum requirements of life in society" could under certain circumstances be considered "protection of the rights and freedoms of others". It wrote: "The Court takes into account the respondent State's point that the face plays an important role in social interaction. [...] The Court is therefore able to accept that the barrier raised against others by a veil concealing the face is perceived by the respondent State as breaching the right of others to live in a space of socialisation which makes living together easier. That being said, in view of the flexibility of the notion of "living together" and the resulting risk of abuse, the Court must engage in a careful examination of the necessity of the impugned limitation".

In the discussion on whether the ban was proportionate, the Court emphasized that the ban had severe consequences for women who wished to wear the veil; as it limited their right to private choices and to express their belief and also could lead to women choosing to isolate themselves. The Court noted that many actors concerned with human rights opposed the ban, and it expressed concern that the wider French debate regarding the law had to some extent included islamophobic arguments.

On the other side, the Court put weight on the French government claim that wearing of a full-face ban was incompatible with the French way of living together. The court wrote: "From that perspective, the respondent State is seeking to protect a principle of interaction between individuals, which in its view is essential for the expression not only of pluralism, but also of tolerance and broadmindedness without which there is no democratic society".

While only France and Belgium had laws that banned the full-face veil, the Court found that bans were debated also in other countries and that there existed no European consensus on whether a ban was legitimate or not.

The Court put some weight on the fact that the ban targeted all kinds of face covering, and not uniquely targeted face covering for religious reasons, and likewise to the fact that the penalties was among the very mildest possible (small fine or mandatory citizenship course).

Underlining that countries should have a wide margin of appreciation regarding questions where views in democratic countries can legitimately differ, the Court concluded that the ban could" be regarded as proportionate to the aim pursued, namely the preservation of the conditions of "living together" as an element of the "protection of the rights and freedoms of others". The impugned limitation could thus be regarded as "necessary in a democratic society". It therefore found no violation of Articles 8 and 9 of the Convention.

=== Minority opinion ===
The minority disagreed with the conclusion and argued that the decision "sacrifices concrete individual rights guaranteed by the Convention to abstract principles".

According to the minority the ultimate motive for banning the face-covering was based on an interpretation of the symbolism of the full-face veil of representing subservience, self-confinement of the individual or other negative characteristics that the minority was unsure was correct. But even if correct, the state had no right to ban dress symbols that could be linked to opinions the state considered offensive. The minority underlined that it was not a human right to be able to communicate with another individual.

The minority further stated that while the face played an important part of most social interactions, it was not a necessary part, and used skiing and carnival as examples that demonstrated that social interactions could function well without seeing each other's face.

In contrast to the majority, the minority found that there was a consensus against the necessity of banning full-face veils in European countries and put weight on the fact that human rights institutions and organizations opposed a ban. In the opinion of the minority the individual state's margin of appreciation should therefore be less broad than the majority had accepted.

The minority found that even if "living together" should be considered a legitimate aim within the meaning of paragraph 2 of Articles 8 and 9, the ban was still disproportionate. Because very few women wear full-face veil, most people would seldom or never meet anybody with the veil even without a ban. For those few who use the veil, the consequences of a ban was on the other side large, as they might have to choose between being confined to their home or violating their own religious convictions or cultural practice. The minority said that even if the fine was small, women who used veils would risk multiple fines, and the cumulative effect for the woman had to be considered.

In conclusion the minority wrote "we find that the criminalization of the wearing of a full-face veil is a measure which is disproportionate to the aim of protecting the idea of 'living together' – an aim which cannot readily be reconciled with the convention's restrictive catalogue of grounds for interference with basic human rights" and they concluded that the ban violated Articles 8 and 9.
