= Peruzzi v. Italy =

2015 European Court of Human Rights decision

- Court: European Court of Human Rights
- Full case name: Peruzzi v. Italy
- Started: May 25, 2009
- Decided: June 30, 2015

Court membership
- Judges sitting: Raimondi, Nicolaou, Bianku, Mahoney, Wojtyczek, Grozev

Case opinions
- Interference with a one's right to freedom of expression is sometimes "necessary in a democratic society" in order to maintain impartiality in the judiciary
- Concurrence: Raimondi, Nicolaou, Bianku, Mahoney
- Dissent: Wojtyczek, Grozev

Laws applied
- Article 10 of the European Convention on Human Rights

Building of the European Court of Human Rights

Peruzzi v. Italy (2015), ECHR Case No. 39294/09 was a decision made by the European Court of Human Rights (ECHR) that specifically addressed anti-judicial speech. The case involved Piero Antonio Peruzzi, an Italian lawyer, who was initially sentenced to four years in prison by the Lucca District Court for defaming a judge. Peruzzi appealed this decision to the Appellate Court of Genoa and was instead fined and required to pay an additional sum to the judge subject to his criticism. On May 25, 2009, Peruzzi brought the case to the European Court of Human Rights, claiming that his conviction was a violation of Article 10 of the European Convention on Human Rights (freedom of expression). On June 30, 2015, the European Court of Human Rights made the decision that the conviction of Peruzzi by the Genoa Court was not disproportionate and that his Article 10 rights to freedom of expression were not violated.

== Background of the case ==
In 2001, Mr. Peruzzi wrote a letter to the Supreme Council of the Judiciary criticizing the conduct of a specific Judge of the Lucca District Court, ‘Judge X’, who was involved in one of Peruzzi's litigations regarding the division of an estate. Following this, Peruzzi then wrote a circulatory letter allegedly criticizing the improper behaviour of judges in general.

Peruzzi's first letter was essentially reproduced in his second, giving details about the decisions adopted by the Judge X, although Peruzzi did not specifically refer to Judge X in the second letter. While the first part of the circular letter gave details about the inheritance case, the second part was dedicated to denouncing judges in general, indicating concern that there are judges who commit errors willfully and maliciously through negligence or lack of commitment “...non può e non deve sbagliarsi volontariamente, con dolo o colpa grave o per imperizia...”. Although Peruzzi did not refer directly to Judge X in the circulatory letter, it was evident that the criticism was aimed at Judge X specifically.

In 2005, Peruzzi was sentenced to four years of prison by the Lucca District Court for defamation and insult. The Court came to this decision after they determined that Peruzzi overstepped his right to criticize, as he threatened the honour of Judge X by claiming that the Judge made such errors intentionally.

In 2007, Peruzzi appealed the Lucca District Court's decision to the Appellate Court of Genoa which concluded that since there was no punishment for insult, Peruzzi would instead be fined €400. Additionally, Peruzzi was required to compensate Judge X €15,000.

In May 2009, Peruzzi brought the case to the European Court of Human Rights, declaring that his conviction was a violation of Article 10.

== Majority opinion ==
Judgment was given by seven ECHR judges, Hirvelä, Raimondi (President), Nicolaou, Bianku, Mahoney, Krzysztof Wojtyczek, and Yonko Grozev. The Court considered whether or not Piero Antonio Peruzzi's rights under Article 10 of the European Convention on Human Rights were violated. The majority came down to a 5-2 decision holding that Peruzzi's conviction did not violate his freedom of speech rights.

Mr. Peruzzi's argument that the criticisms expressed in his letter were not directed specifically at Judge X but rather at the Italian judicial system, in general, was rejected. The majority could not fail to interpret Peruzzi's letter as specific denunciation of Judge X's behaviour. The Court then had to determine whether or not Peruzzi's letter overstepped the limits of criticism in a democratic society. The majority determined that Peruzzi had overstepped his right to free expression with specific statements, aimed at Judge X, such as:

1. “per partito preso, magari con l’uso dell’arroganza…decidere con totale disinteresse e disimpegno”

“Bias with the use of arrogance…complete disinterest and disengagement”

2. “Il giudice è un uomo e può commettere errori…, ma non può e non deve sbagliarsi volontariamente, con dolo o colpa grave o per imperizia”

“The judge is a man and can therefore make errors…but it can not and should not be voluntarily mistaken with intent of gross negligence or incompetence”.

The initial criticism of Judge X made by Peruzzi, that he adopted unjust decisions, was not deemed excessive. However, the second criticism stating that Judge X had willfully committed errors with malicious intent or even negligence implied that Judge X abandoned his ethical responsibilities as a judge, and was deemed excessive as the defendant provided no useful evidence demonstrating Judge X's malice.

Mr. Peruzzi did not wait to hear the outcome of his case against Judge X from the Supreme Council of the Judiciary before circulating the letter. The majority noted that rather than presenting these claims at the hearing of the inheritance case, Peruzzi circulated his letter in a context that was unrelated to the proceedings, which was inevitably bound to undermine Judge X's credibility and reputation. Peruzzi's sentence was reduced from four years of prison to €400. The €400 fine and €15,000 compensation fee for Judge X were not deemed excessive by the majority.

The Court concluded that the penalty imposed on Peruzzi was not disproportionate to the case and that the Italian court had done a sufficient job in justifying their decision. The interference with Peruzzi's right to freedom of expression could be considered “necessary in a democratic society” in order to maintain impartiality in the judiciary. The Court stated that there was no violation of this right, Article 10&2 “2. L’esercizio di queste libertà... può essere sottoposto alle formalità, condizioni, restrizioni o sanzioni che sono previste dalla legge e che costituiscono misure necessarie, in una società democratica... per garantire l’autorità e l’imparzialità del potere giudiziario”.

== Dissenting opinion ==
There were two dissenting opinions in this case. Judges Wojtyczek and Grozev wrote dissenting opinions on the same grounds. Neither judge could adhere to the view expressed by the majority according to which Article 10 of the convention has not been violated in this case, “Non possiamo aderire al punto di vista espresso dalla maggioranza secondo il quale l’articolo 10 della Convenzione non è stato violato nella presente causa”.

The applicant submitted a plea claiming that his freedom of expression had been infringed upon, and while it is important to justify the protection of others reputations in certain cases, it is crucial to find a balance between both rights in question. Interfering with either must be justified by appropriate and serious reasons.

The Court identified in its case a number of factors that must be examined in order to determine whether a restriction on the freedom of expression is justified, (see, Vonn Hannover v. Germany, Nos. 40660/08 and 60641/08, and Axel Springer AG v. Germany no. 39954/08). The Italian court took these different factors into account but as interpreted by Wojtyczek and Grozev, the reasons given by the national court were not satisfactory with regards to Article 10, as they did not provide relevant or compelling reasons to justify interference in freedom of expression.

Wojtyczek and Grozev further stated that the majority failed to consider elements such as the content of the disputed claims, and whether or not the person subject to criticism has been cited by name, having been clearly accused of facts that could be damaging to their reputation. The fact that the name of Judge X was not explicitly mentioned may lessen the scope of the claims made by Peruzzi. Likewise, the probable consequences of the accusations must be also considered. According to Wojtyczek and Grozev, neither the national courts nor the majority examined these elements to the necessary extent.

Since Peruzzi did not specifically refer to Judge X by name, he left room for ambiguity regarding the identity of Judge X. The claims were addressed to a group of judges accustomed to receiving various forms of complaints and criticisms by unhappy individuals or lawyers, rather than the public, which was not aware of the content of the statements circulated to the judges. Typically these complaints have no effect on the reputation of the judge in question. Wojtyczek and Grozev support that the letter circulated by Peruzzi likely had no real impact on the image of Judge X.

Overall, Judges Wojtyczek and Grozev concluded that the penalty imposed was manifestly disproportionate due to the nature of the claims made and the very small group of persons to whom they were addressed. The majority claimed that it was necessary to convict Peruzzi in order to uphold integrity and authority in the Italian judiciary, however, the dissenting judges viewed Peruzzi's conviction as a decision that would produce the opposite of the intended effect.

== Subsequent developments ==
The decision made by the European Court of Human Rights regarding the case of Peruzzi v. Italy is among several similar ECHR decisions regarding anti-judicial speech (e.g. Karpetas v. Greece). Many constitutional courts in the world have yet to determine where the line should be drawn between acceptable criticism of judicial performance and unlawful threats to judicial independence. Previously, the ECHR was inconsistent in its responses to this issue, but started to err on the side of speech protection following the cases of Barfod v. Denmark and Prager v. Austria. The ECHR continues to work on developing a strategy for distinguishing anti-judicial speech that is acceptable under Article 10 from anti-judicial speech that is threatening or harmful in a way that exceeds the limits of one's freedom of speech.
