= Bowman v United Kingdom =

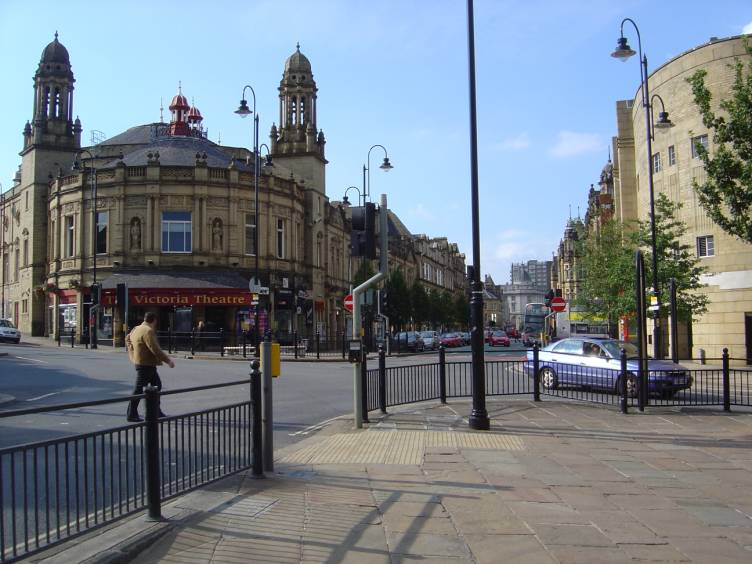
- Court: European Court of Human Rights
- Citations: [1998] ECHR 4, (1998) 26 EHRR 1

Keywords
- Democracy, money

Bowman v United Kingdom [1998] ECHR 4 is a case in the European Court of Human Rights, concerning the legitimate limits on campaign finance spending. A majority of the court held that countries joined to the European Convention on Human Rights may be required to permit minimal levels of campaign spending. The minority held that the United Kingdom's near total ban on election-related spending should be regarded as compatible with ECHR article 10.

The principle in Bowman stands in contrast to the unlimited spending at elections that the US Supreme Court opened up by Buckley v. Valeo, where a majority struck down parts of the Federal Election Campaign Act of 1971, and the licence of corporations to donate money as a protected right of "free speech" in Citizens United v. FEC, with or without authorisation by their stakeholders.

== Facts ==
Phyllis Bowman, an anti-abortion campaigner, distributed 25,000 leaflets in Halifax before the 1992 general election on the positions of three candidates on abortion. She was prosecuted under the Representation of the People Act 1983 section 75 for the offence of spending more than £5 on publications aiming to promote a candidate six weeks before an election, without authorisation. She was acquitted because the summons was issued out of time. However, Bowman contended at the European Court of Human Rights that her prosecution was an unjustifiable interference with her freedom of expression under the European Convention on Human Rights, article 10.

== Judgment ==
The majority of fourteen out of twenty judges on the European Court of Human Rights held there was a violation of ECHR article 10. The Representation of the People Act 1983 section 75 was an indirect restriction freedom of expression. The restriction was prescribed by law, and pursued a legitimate aim of protecting others' rights: candidates and the electorate, by seeking to secure equality among candidates. Freedom of expression and the right to free elections were the foundation of a democratic system, but election spending could undermine equal elections. However, a £5 spending limit was practically an absolute bar on distributing information to influence voters. Given the lack of restrictions on political parties, it was not a proportionate response to secure equality between the candidates.

42. Free elections and freedom of expression, particularly freedom of political debate, together form the bedrock of any democratic system. The two rights are interrelated and operate to reinforce each other: for example, as the court has observed in the past, freedom of expression is one of the ‘conditions’ necessary to ‘ensure the free expression of the opinion of the people in the choice of the legislature’. For this reason, it is particularly important in the period preceding an election that opinions and information of all kinds are permitted to circulate freely.

== Consequences ==
In response to this judgment, the spending limit of £5 per individual was increased to £500 (for Parliamentary elections) in the Political Parties, Elections and Referendums Act 2000.

== See also ==
- Campaign finance and Political finance
- UK corporate law
- Harper v. Canada (Attorney General) [2004] SCR 827
- Buckley v Valeo, 424 U.S. 1 (1976)
- Citizens United v FEC, US (2010)
- McCutcheon v. FEC (2014)
- R (ProLife Alliance) v. BBC [2003] UKHL 23, BBC could refuse to broadcast graphic footage for an anti-abortion political party under the Broadcasting Act 1990 s 6(1)(a)
- Animal Defenders International v United Kingdom [2013] ECHR 362, (2013) 57 EHRR 21, the ban on political advertising under the Communications Act 2003 s 321(2) was compatible with ECHR article 10. Also [2008] UKHL 15.
- Political Parties, Elections and Referendums Act 2000 Schs 9 and 10
- Companies Act 2006 ss 362-379
