= Moral theology of Rowan Williams =

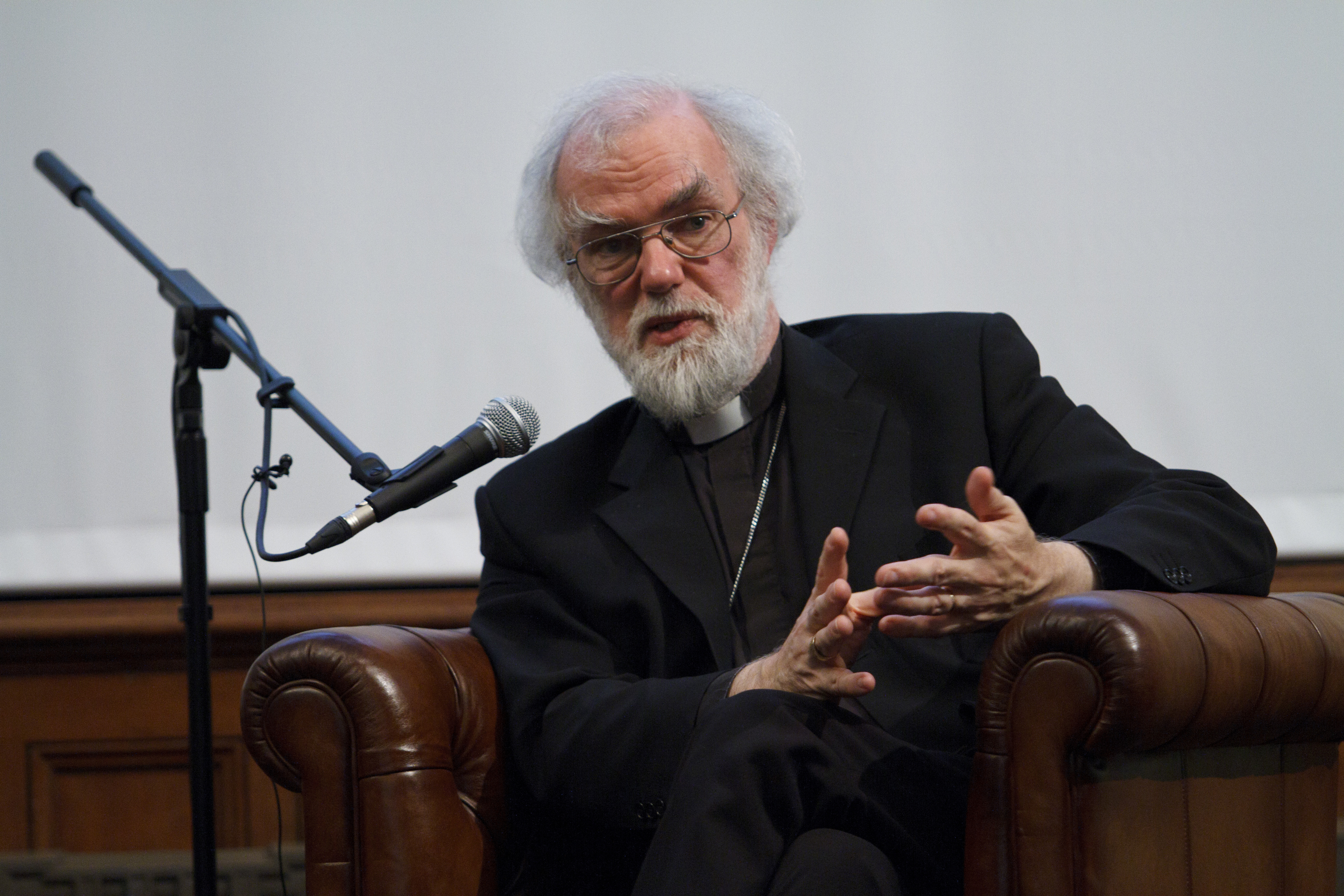
Rowan Williams

Rowan Williams (born 14 June 1950) is a Welsh Anglican bishop, theologian and poet who was Archbishop of Canterbury from 2002 to 2012, previously having been Bishop of Monmouth and Archbishop of Wales. His moral theology has had a significant impact on the ongoing debate on Anglican views of homosexuality and has been cited both by opponents and defenders of the gay movement within the Anglican Communion.

== "The Body's Grace" ==
"The Body's Grace" is a lecture and essay written by Rowan Williams on the topic of Christian theology and sexuality. It was composed when he was Lady Margaret Professor of Divinity at the University of Oxford in 1989. His writings on the subject were perceived as quite liberal before he became the Archbishop of Canterbury. It is now part of a series of essays collected in the book Theology and Sexuality.

== Abstract deployment of ambiguous biblical texts ==
In the conclusion of this address, he asserted:

In a church that accepts the legitimacy of contraception, the absolute condemnation of same-sex relations of intimacy must rely either on an abstract fundamentalist deployment of a number of very ambiguous biblical texts, or on a problematic and nonscriptural theory about natural complementarity, applied narrowly and crudely to physical differentiation without regard to psychological structures.

== Efforts to study Christianity and sexuality ==
The same year as he made the above comments, and as a practical consequence of the views he expressed, Williams founded the Institute for the Study of Christianity and Sexuality (which in 1996 became the Centre for the Study of Christianity and Sexuality). He was then Professor of Divinity at Oxford University, and this work characterised him amongst liberal Anglicans as a significant figure in the effort to make the Anglican Church's moral stance on homosexuality more accepting.

== Homosexual relations among the clergy ==
When he became Archbishop of Canterbury, questions of whether and how Williams would apply his views, specifically with regard to homosexual relationships among the clergy, were put squarely in the spotlight, through the issue of the proposed consecration of a gay priest, Jeffrey John, as Bishop of Reading. Following protest from a number of bishops from various parts of the Anglican Communion, Williams asked John to withdraw his candidacy, but then arranged his appointment as Dean of St Albans, one of the oldest Christian sites in England, in a move that was widely seen as a moderate compromise to maintain the latitudinarian unity of the Anglican Communion.

Though acknowledging that he was simplifying the Church's position, Williams said in September 2010 that "There's no problem about a gay person who's a bishop. It's about the fact that there are traditionally, historically, standards that the clergy are expected to observe." Asked what was wrong with a homosexual bishop having a partner, he said: "I think because the scriptural and traditional approach to this doesn't give much ground for being positive about it."

== Welcoming but not inclusive ==
In a 2006 interview with the Dutch newspaper Nederlands Dagblad, Williams discussed the Episcopal Church in the United States of America's increasingly liberal policies regarding homosexuality, saying that "in terms of decision-making the American Church has pushed the boundaries." Williams argued that the Church had to be "welcoming", rather than "inclusive", a distinction he characterised by saying: "I don't believe inclusion is a value in itself. Welcome is. We don't say 'Come in and we ask no questions'. I do believe conversion means conversion of habits, behaviours, ideas, emotions. The boundaries are determined by what it means to be loyal to Jesus Christ." Moreover, the archbishop appeared to distance himself from his more liberal 1989 essay, explaining, "That was when I was a professor, to stimulate debate ... It did not generate much support and a lot of criticism – quite fairly on a number of points."

However, in a later interview with Time magazine in June 2007, he stated that he had not changed his own mind, although he is now constrained from expressing personal views at variance with the corporate view of the Church. In answer to the question "You yourself once thought it possible that same-sex relationships might be legitimate in God's eyes" he responded: "Yes, I argued that in 1987. I still think that the points I made there and the questions I raised were worth making as part of the ongoing discussion. I'm not recanting. But those were ideas put forward as part of a theological discussion. I'm now in a position where I'm bound to say the teaching of the Church is this, the consensus is this. We have not changed our minds corporately. It's not for me to exploit my position to push a change."

== Abortion ==
He has indicated opposition to abortion writing that, for himself, "it is impossible to view abortion as anything other than the deliberate termination of a human life." He is a lifetime member of the anti-abortion group SPUC.

== Euthanasia ==
Archbishop Williams stated that he remained opposed to voluntary euthanasia despite seeing his mother's painful months of decline and dementia. He has voiced similar opposition to assisted suicide.

== Civil and human rights of homosexuals ==
In contrast to his diminished outspokenness on the acceptability of homosexual relationships as a matter of theology, however, he has continued to affirm the civil and human rights of homosexuals. For example, in his Advent letter for 2007 he said: "... it is part of our Christian and Anglican discipleship to condemn homophobic prejudice and violence, to defend the human rights and civil liberties of homosexual people and to offer them the same pastoral care and loving service that we owe to all in Christ's name."

== Defence of LGBT people against violence and bigotry ==
In "The Challenge and Hope of Being an Anglican Today", an address to the Anglican Communion in June 2006, he said: "It is possible – indeed, it is imperative – to give the strongest support to the defence of homosexual people against violence, bigotry and legal disadvantage, to appreciate the role played in the life of the church by people of homosexual orientation, and still to believe that this doesn’t settle the question of whether the Christian Church has the freedom, on the basis of the Bible, and its historic teachings, to bless homosexual partnerships as a clear expression of God’s will."

== Reflecting the love of God ==
In 2008, it was reported that Williams had stated in 2000 or 2001 that homosexual relationships could "reflect the love of God" in a manner comparable to heterosexual marriages, and that he believed that passages in the Bible which are often cited in support of the view that homosexuality is a sin, in fact are aimed at heterosexual people seeking variety in their sexual experience, rather than at gay people.

== See also ==
- Christian ethics
