= Young, James and Webster v United Kingdom =

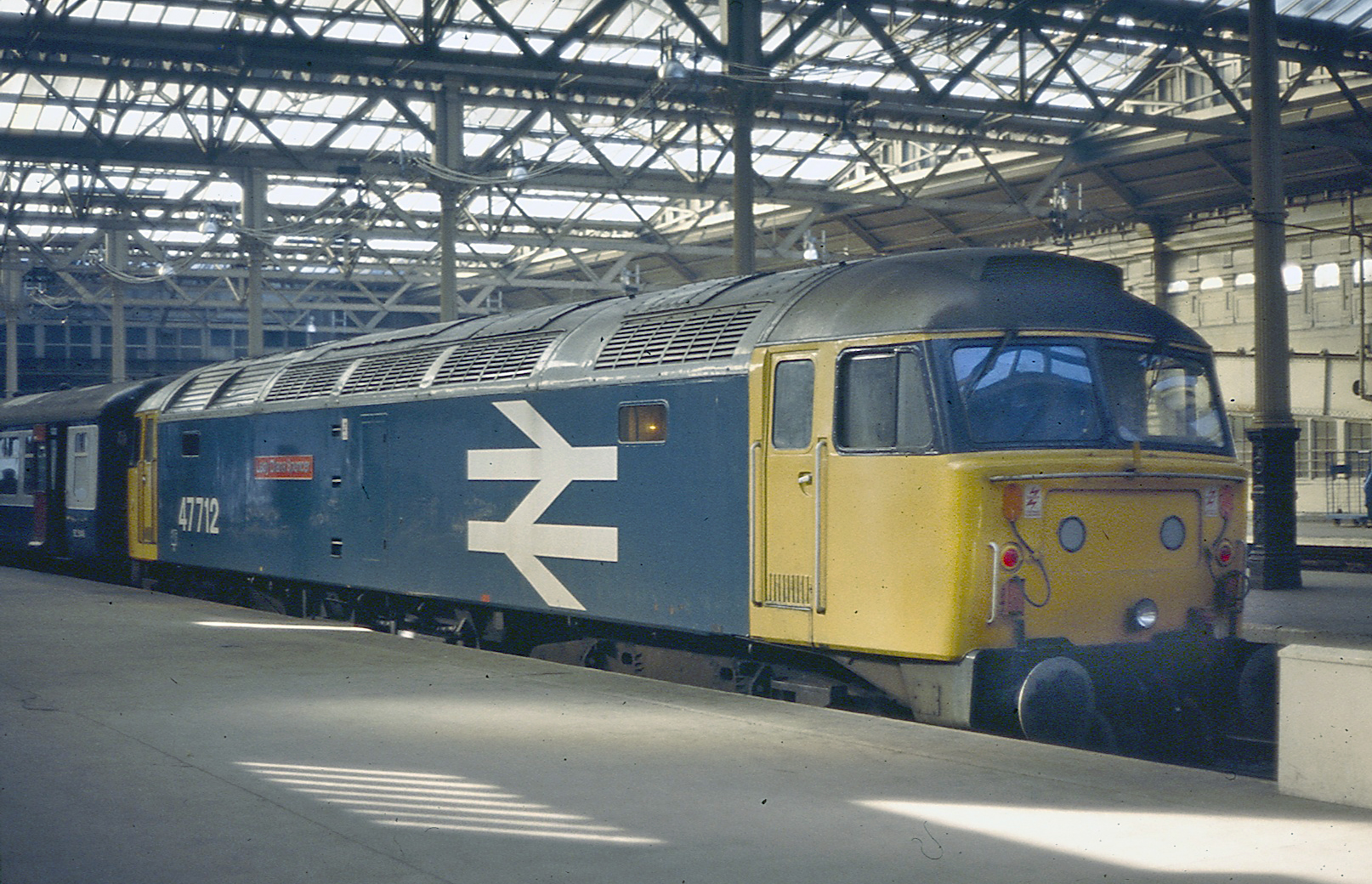
- Court: European Court of Human Rights
- Citations: [1981] ECHR 4, (1981) 4 EHRR 38

Keywords
- Trade union, closed shop, collective bargaining

Young, James and Webster v United Kingdom [1981] ECHR 4 is a UK labour law case, concerning freedom of association and the closed shop. It found that the closed shop was incompatible with the convention, although it does not prevent fair share agreements, or automatic enrollment in union membership with an opt-out.

== Facts ==
British Rail signed a union membership agreement with unions so that all employees would have to join one union.

== Judgment ==
A majority of the European Court of Human Rights held that a closed shop could violate the Convention if (1) there was an obligation to make existing and not just new employees union members (2) where membership would violate other ECHR rights, especially article 9 and 10, and where (3) the obligation was underpinned by dismissal from employment. There were situations where article 11(2) could be fulfilled, but this was not one of them.

54. As a consequence of the agreement concluded in 1975 (see paragraph 29 above), the applicants were faced with the dilemma either of joining NUR (in the case of Mr. James) or TSSA or NUR (in the cases of Mr. Young and Mr. Webster) or of losing jobs for which union membership had not been a requirement when they were first engaged and which two of them had held for several years. Each applicant regarded the membership condition introduced by that agreement as an interference with the freedom of association to which he considered that he was entitled; in addition, Mr. Young and Mr. Webster had objections to trade union policies and activities coupled, in the case of Mr. Young, with objections to the political affiliations of the specified unions (see paragraphs 34, 37 and 43 above). As a result of their refusal to yield to what they considered to be unjustified pressure, they received notices terminating their employment. Under the legislation in force at the time (see paragraphs 17 and 20-23 above), their dismissal was "fair" and, hence, could not found a claim for compensation, let alone reinstatement or re-engagement.

55. The situation facing the applicants clearly runs counter to the concept of freedom of association in its negative sense. Assuming that Article 11 (art. 11) does not guarantee the negative aspect of that freedom on the same footing as the positive aspect, compulsion to join a particular trade union may not always be contrary to the Convention. However, a threat of dismissal involving loss of livelihood is a most serious form of compulsion and, in the present instance, it was directed against persons engaged by British Rail before the introduction of any obligation to join a particular trade union. In the Court’s opinion, such a form of compulsion, in the circumstances of the case, strikes at the very substance of the freedom guaranteed by Article 11 (art. 11). For this reason alone, there has been an interference with that freedom as regards each of the three applicants.

[...]

58. The Government expressly stated that, should the Court find an interference with a right guaranteed by paragraph 1 of Articles 9, 10 or 11 (art. 9-1, art. 10-1, art. 11-1), they would not seek to argue that such interference was justified under paragraph 2. The Court has nevertheless decided that it should examine this issue of its own motion, certain considerations of relevance in this area being contained in the documents and information with which it has been furnished.

59. An interference with the exercise of an Article 11 (art. 11) right will not be compatible with paragraph 2 (art. 11-2) unless it was "prescribed by law", had an aim or aims that is or are legitimate under that paragraph and was "necessary in a democratic society" for the aforesaid aim or aims (see, mutatis mutandis, the Sunday Times judgment of 26 April 1979, Series A no. 30, p. 29, par. 45).

60. The applicants argued that the restrictions of which they complained met none of these three conditions. The Court does not find it indispensable to determine whether the first two conditions were satisfied, these being issues which were not fully argued before it. It will assume that the interference was "prescribed by law", within the meaning of the Convention (see the above-mentioned Sunday Times judgment, pp. 30-31, par. 46-49), and had the aim, amongst other things, of protecting the "rights and freedoms of others", this being the only of the aims listed in paragraph 2 that might be relevant.

61. In connection with the last point, the Court’s attention has been drawn to a number of advantages said to flow from the closed shop system in general, such as the fostering of orderly collective bargaining, leading to greater stability in industrial relations; the avoidance of a proliferation of unions and the resultant trade union anarchy; the counteracting of inequality of bargaining power; meeting the need of some employers to negotiate with a body fully representative of the workforce; satisfying the wish of some trade unionists not to work alongside non-union employees; ensuring that trade union activities do not benefit of those who make no financial contribution thereto. Any comment on these arguments would be out of place in the present case since the closed shop system as such is not under review (see paragraph 53 above).

62. On the other hand, what has to be determined is the "necessity" for the interference complained of: in order to achieve the aims of the unions party to the 1975 agreement with British Rail, was it "necessary in a democratic society" to make lawful the dismissal of the applicants, who were engaged at a time when union membership was not a condition of employment?

63. A number of principles relevant to the assessment of the "necessity" of a given measure have been stated by the Court in its Handyside judgment of 7 December 1976 (Series A no. 24). Firstly, "necessary" in this context does not have the flexibility of such expressions as "useful" or "desirable" (p. 22, par. 48). The fact that British Rail’s closed shop agreement may in a general way have produced certain advantages is therefore not of itself conclusive as to the necessity of the interference complained of. Secondly, pluralism, tolerance and broadmindedness are hallmarks of a "democratic society" (p. 23, par. 49). Although individual interests must on occasion be subordinated to those of a group, democracy does not simply mean that the views of a majority must always prevail: a balance must be achieved which ensures the fair and proper treatment of minorities and avoids any abuse of a dominant position. Accordingly, the mere fact that the applicants’ standpoint was adopted by very few of their colleagues is again not conclusive of the issue now before the Court. Thirdly, any restriction imposed on a Convention right must be proportionate to the legitimate aim pursued (p. 23, par. 49).

64. The Court has noted in this connection that a majority of the Royal Commission on Trade Unions and Employers’ Associations, which reported in 1968, considered that the position of existing employees in a newly-introduced closed shop was one area in which special safeguards were desirable (see paragraph 14 above). Again, recent surveys suggest that, even prior to the entry into force of the Employment Act 1980 (see paragraph 24 above), many closed shop arrangements did not require existing non-union employees to join a specified union (see paragraph 13 above); the Court has not been informed of any special reasons justifying the imposition of such a requirement in the case of British Rail. Besides, according to statistics furnished by the applicants, which were not contested, a substantial majority even of union members themselves disagreed with the proposition that persons refusing to join a union for strong reasons should be dismissed from employment. Finally, in 1975 more than 95 per cent of British Rail employees were already members of NUR, TSSA or ASLEF (see paragraph 31 above). All these factors suggest that the railway unions would in no way have been prevented from striving for the protection of their members’ interests (see the above-mentioned National Union of Belgian Police judgment, p. 18, par. 39) through the operation of the agreement with British Rail even if the legislation in force had not made it permissible to compel non-union employees having objections like the applicants to join a specified union.

65. Having regard to all the circumstances of the case, the detriment suffered by Mr. Young, Mr. James and Mr. Webster went further than was required to achieve a proper balance between the conflicting interests of those involved and cannot be regarded as proportionate to the aims being pursued. Even making due allowance for a State’s "margin of appreciation" (see, inter alia, the above-mentioned Sunday Times judgment, p. 36, par. 59), the Court thus finds that the restrictions complained of were not "necessary in a democratic society", as required by paragraph 2 of Article 11 (art. 11-2).

There has accordingly been a violation of Article 11 (art. 11).

Mr Sørensen, joined by Mr. Thór Vilhjálmsson and Mr. Lagergren dissented.

1. The issue under Article 11 (art. 11) is whether or not freedom of association as protected by that Article (art. 11) implies a right for the individual not to be constrained to join or belong to any particular association, or in other words whether or not the so-called negative freedom of association or - in the terminology adopted by the Court - the negative aspect of the freedom of association is covered by Article 11 (art. 11).

2. The answer to this question must take account of the statement made by the Conference of Senior Officials in its report of 19 June 1950 (see paragraph 51 of the judgment). It clearly emerges from this element of the drafting history that the States Parties to the Convention could not agree to assume any international obligation in the matter, but found that it should be subject to national regulation only.

3. The attitude thus adopted was entirely consistent with the attitude previously adopted within the framework of the International Labour Organisation. In dealing with questions of trade union rights and freedom to organise, the competent bodies of that organisation had traditionally held that union security arrangements were matters for regulation in accordance with national law and practice and could not be considered as either authorised or prohibited by the texts adopted in the ILO (see C. Wilfred Jenks, The International Protection of Trade Union Freedom, London 1957, pp. 29-30; Nicolas Valticos, Droit international du travail, Paris 1970, pp. 268-69; Geraldo von Potobsky, The Freedom of the Worker to Organise according to the Principles and Standards of the International Labour Organisation, in Die Koalitionsfreiheit des Arbeitnehmers, Heidelberg 1980, vol. II, at pp. 1132-36). This understanding has been maintained ever since and also been expressed by the States Parties to the European Social Charter of 1961 with respect to the obligations undertaken in virtue of that instrument (See Appendix, Part II, Article 1, paragraph 2).

4. During the proceedings in the present case it was argued on behalf of the respondent Government by the Solicitor-General that "the scale of the closed shop system within Britain and the state of the common law was such that the inclusion within Article 11 (art. 11) of the right not to be compelled to join a union would inevitably have required the United Kingdom to make a reservation in respect of any such right" (verbatim record of the hearing on the morning of 4 March 1981, doc. Cour (81) 19, p. 75).

5. Reference to the "substance" of freedom of association is not relevant in the present context. Although the Court has often relied on the notion of the substance of the rights guaranteed by the Convention, it has done so only when the question was what regulation or limitation of a right was justified. It has held that even in cases where regulation or limitations were allowed explicitly or by necessary implication, they could not go so far as to affect the very substance of the right concerned. In the present case, however, the problem is whether the negative aspect of the freedom of association is part of the substance of the right guaranteed by Article 11 (art. 11). For the reasons stated above the States Parties to the Convention must be considered to have agreed not to include the negative aspect, and no canon of interpretation can be adduced in support of extending the scope of the Article (art. 11) to a matter which deliberately has been left out and reserved for regulation according to national law and traditions of each State Party to the Convention.

6. This conclusion is perfectly compatible with the nature and function of the rights in question. The so-called positive and negative freedom of association are not simply two sides of the same coin or, as the Court puts it, two aspects of the same freedom. There is no logical link between the two.

The positive freedom of association safeguards the possibility of individuals, if they so wish, to associate with each other for the purpose of protecting common interests and pursuing common goals, whether of an economic, professional, political, cultural, recreational or other character, and the protection consists in preventing public authorities from intervening to frustrate such common action. It concerns the individual as an active participant in social activities, and it is in a sense a collective right in so far as it can only be exercised jointly by a plurality of individuals. The negative freedom of association, by contrast, aims at protecting the individual against being grouped together with other individuals with whom he does not agree or for purposes which he does not approve. It tends to protect him from being identified with convictions, endeavours or attitudes which he does not share and thus to defend the intimate sphere of the personality. In addition, it may serve the purpose of protecting the individual against misuse of power by an association and against being manipulated by its leaders. However strongly such protection of the individual may sometimes be needed, it is neither in logic nor by necessary implication part of the positive freedom of association.

7. It follows that union security arrangements and the practice of the "closed shop" are neither prohibited, nor authorised by Article 11 (art. 11) of the Convention. Objectionable as the treatment suffered by the applicants may be on grounds of reason and equity, the adequate solution lies, not in any extensive interpretation of that Article (art. 11) but in safeguards against dismissal because of refusal to join a union, that is in safeguarding the right to security of employment in such circumstances. But this right is not among those recognised by the Convention which - as stated in the Preamble - is only a first step for the collective enforcement of human rights. At present, it is therefore a matter for regulation by the national law of each State.

== See also ==
- UK labour law
