= Animal Defenders International v United Kingdom =

UK constitutional case law

Animal Defenders Int v UK
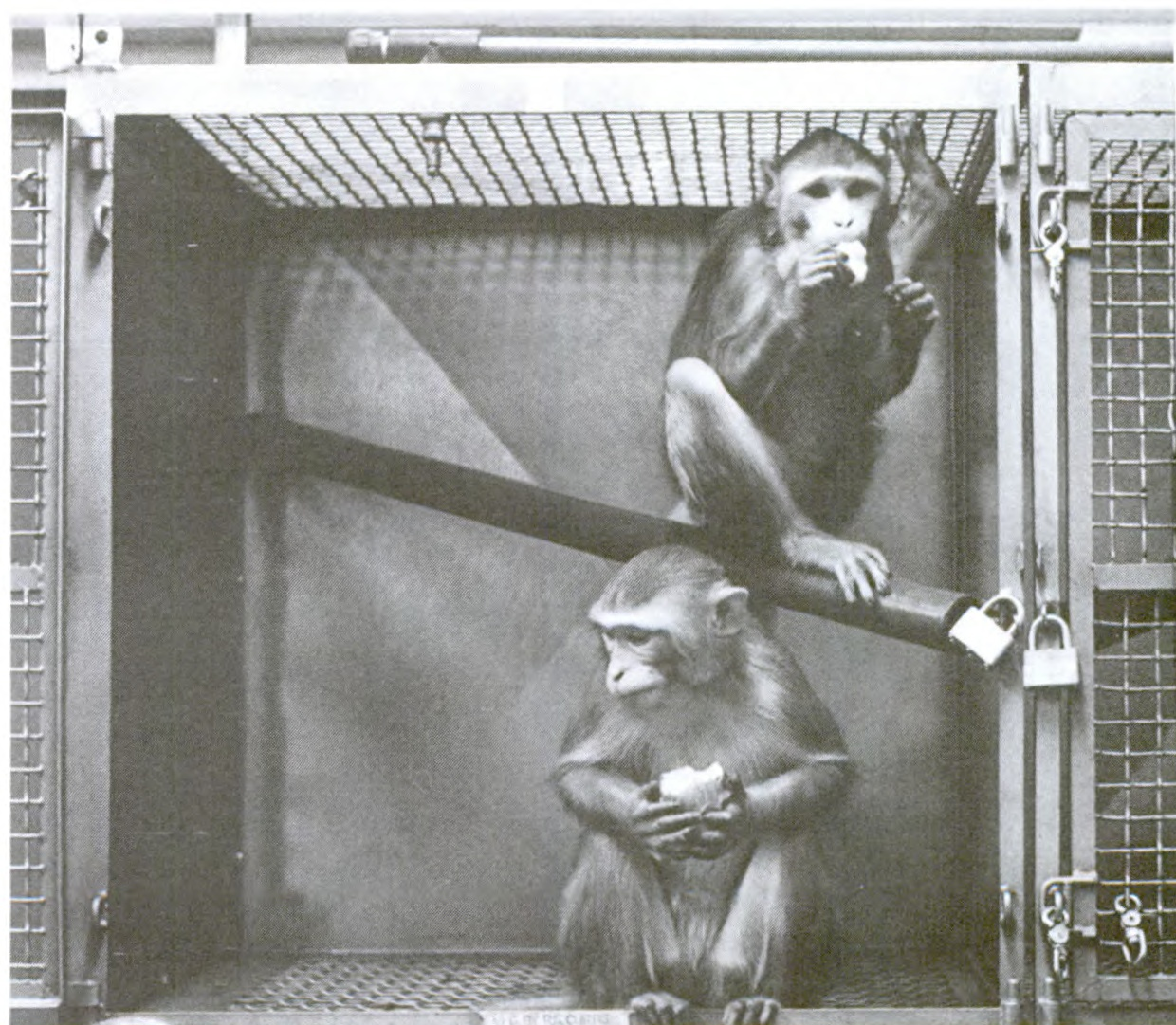
- "My mate's a primate"
- Court: European Court of Human Rights
- Citation: [2013] ECHR 362, (2013) 57 EHRR 21

Case history
- Prior actions: R (Animal Defenders International) v Secretary of State for Culture Media and Sport [2006] EWHC 3069, [2008] UKHL 15 and [2011] ECHR 191

Keywords
- Freedom of expression, money, equality

Animal Defenders International v United Kingdom [2013] ECHR 362 is United Kingdom constitutional law and a UK, European and international human rights case, on political spending at elections. It held that the United Kingdom's ban on spending money on political advertising, under the Communications Act 2003 section 321(2), was fully compatible with freedom of expression under the ECHR article 10.

While reflecting most of the election laws in the democratic world, the case stands in heavy contrast to Buckley v. Valeo and Citizens United v. FEC, as decided by majorities of the US Supreme Court, as well as Australian Capital Television v Commonwealth as decided by the majority of the High Court of Australia.

== Facts ==
The UK's Communications Act 2003 section 321(2) bans political and industrial dispute related adverts. Animal Defenders International had an advertisement, not offensive, which was themed 'My Mate's a Primate'. The Broadcast Advertising Clearance Centre refused to let it show because it was deemed to fall within the prohibition on political advertising. They said this breached their ECHR article 10 right to freedom of expression.

== Judgment ==
=== House of Lords ===
The House of Lords held unanimously that there was no breach of ECHR article 10, because the Communications Act 2003 was designed to level the playing field of expression, and therefore empower everyone's freedom of expression to the utmost.

Giving the leading judgment, Lord Bingham said the only issue (not interference, not legitimate aim pursued) was whether the restriction was 'necessary in a democratic society'. If views are debated then truth prevails over time, and the law was to ensure equality of debate. If parties can buy coverage proportionate to their resources, this would distort. The case of VgT Verein gegen Tierfabriken v Switzerland was considered, but found to be inapplicable to the British context, where the full strength of arguments against money in politics was considered.

28. The fundamental rationale of the democratic process is that if competing views, opinions and policies are publicly debated and exposed to public scrutiny the good will over time drive out the bad and the true prevail over the false. It must be assumed that, given time, the public will make a sound choice when, in the course of the democratic process, it has the right to choose. But it is highly desirable that the playing field of debate should be so far as practicable level. This is achieved where, in public discussion, differing views are expressed, contradicted, answered and debated. It is the duty of broadcasters to achieve this object in an impartial way by presenting balanced programmes in which all lawful views may be ventilated. It is not achieved if political parties can, in proportion to their resources, buy unlimited opportunities to advertise in the most effective media, so that elections become little more than an auction. Nor is it achieved if well-endowed interests which are not political parties are able to use the power of the purse to give enhanced prominence to views which may be true or false, attractive to progressive minds or unattractive, beneficial or injurious. The risk is that objects which are essentially political may come to be accepted by the public not because they are shown in public debate to be right but because, by dint of constant repetition, the public has been conditioned to accept them. The rights of others which a restriction on the exercise of the right to free expression may properly be designed to protect must, in my judgment, include a right to be protected against the potential mischief of partial political advertising. 29. I do not think the full strength of this argument was deployed in VgT. And in that case the applicant was seeking to respond, with a wholly inoffensive advertisement, to commercials broadcast by the meat industry... Hypothetical examples spring readily to mind: adverts by well-endowed multi-national companies seeking to thwart or delay action on climate change; adverts by wealthy groups seeking to ban abortion; or, if not among member states of the Council of Europe, adverts by so-called patriotic groups supporting the right of the citizen to bear arms. Parliament was entitled to regard the risk of such adverts as a real danger, none the less so because legislation has up to now prevented its occurrence.

Lord Scott, while concurring with the result, dissented on one point at paragraph 44, by suggesting that ECHR cases were not actually binding on the UK courts.

Baroness Hale gave a concurring judgment.

47. There was an elephant in the committee room, always there but never mentioned, when we heard this case. It was the dominance of advertising, not only in elections but also in the formation of political opinion, in the United States of America. Enormous sums are spent, and therefore have to be raised, at election times: it is estimated that the disputed 2000 elections for President and Congress cost as much as US$3 billion. Attempts to regulate campaign spending are struck down in the name of the First Amendment: "Congress shall make no law . . . abridging the freedom of speech, or of the press": see particularly Buckley v Valeo, 424 US 1 (1976). A fortiori there is no limit to the amount that pressure groups can spend on getting their message across in the most powerful and pervasive media available.

48. In the United Kingdom, and elsewhere in Europe, we do not want our government or its policies to be decided by the highest spenders. Our democracy is based upon more than one person one vote. It is based on the view that each person has equal value. "Within the sphere of democratic politics, we confront each other as moral equals" (Ackerman and Ayres, Voting with Dollars, 2003, p 12). We want everyone to be able to make up their own minds on the important issues of the day. For this we need the free exchange of information and ideas. We have to accept that some people have greater resources than others with which to put their views across. But we want to avoid the grosser distortions which unrestricted access to the broadcast media will bring.

49. So this case is not just about permissible restrictions on freedom of expression. It is about striking the right balance between the two most important components of a democracy: freedom of expression and voter equality. There are aspects of the ban on broadcasting political advertisements which no-one disputes: in particular, advertising by candidates for election, or by political parties, whether or not at election times. But this case is about advertising by a particular interest group which campaigns for changes in the law.

50. The proposed advertisement shows an animal's cage, in which a chained girl gradually emerges from the shadows into view; the screen goes black and the following messages appear: "A chimp has the mental age of a 4-year-old"; "Although we share 98% of our genetic makeup they are still caged and abused to entertain us"; "Please help us to stop their suffering by making a donation today"; the final shot is of a monkey in a cage in exactly the same position as the girl was in. It takes little imagination to understand how powerful this would be, much more powerful than a static image on a bill-board or printed page, and beamed into every households in the land where anyone was watching commercial television at the time. It is also clearly part of a campaign for change in the law, and thus prohibited by sections 319(2)(g), 321(2)(b), and 321(3)(b), as well as by sections 319(2)(g) and 321(2)(a), which prohibit any advertising by bodies whose objects are wholly or mainly of a political nature.

51. For all the reasons which my noble and learned friend, Lord Bingham of Cornhill, has so eloquently and comprehensively given, I agree that the ban as it operates in this case is not incompatible with the appellants' Convention rights. It is a balanced and proportionate response to the problem: they can seek to put their case across in any other way, but not the one which so greatly risks distorting the public debate in favour of the rich. There has to be the same rule for the same kind of advertising, whatever the cause for which it campaigns and whatever the resources of the campaigners. We must not distinguish between causes of which we approve and causes of which we disapprove. Nor in practice can we distinguish between small organisations which have to fight for every penny and rich ones with access to massive sums. Capping or rationing will not work, for the reasons Lord Bingham gives.

Lord Carswell and Lord Neuberger concurred with Lord Bingham.

=== European Court of Human Rights ===
By a bare majority (9:8), the European Court of Human Rights held the ban on political advertising under the Communications Act 2003 section 321(2) was fully compatible with ECHR article 10. The majority reasoned as follows.

117. The Court, for its part, attaches considerable weight to these exacting and pertinent reviews, by both parliamentary and judicial bodies, of the complex regulatory regime governing political broadcasting in the United Kingdom and to their view that the general measure was necessary to prevent the distortion of crucial public interest debates and, thereby, the undermining of the democratic process. 118. In addition, the Court considers it important that the prohibition was specifically circumscribed to address the precise risk of distortion the State sought to avoid with the minimum impairment of the right of expression. It only applies therefore to advertising given its inherently partial nature (Murphy, at § 42), to paid advertising given the danger of unequal access based on wealth and to political advertising (as explained at paragraph 99 above) as it was considered to go to the heart of the democratic process. It is also confined to certain media (radio and television) since they are considered to be the most influential and expensive media and to constitute a cornerstone of the regulatory system at issue in the present case. The limits placed on a restriction are important factors in the assessment of its proportionality (Mouvement raëlien suisse v. Switzerland [GC], § 75, cited above). Consequently, a range of alternative media were available to the applicant and these are outlined at paragraph 124 below.

In various dissents, a minority of the court, while stressing that money should never buy elections, objected to a total ban on spending.

== See also ==
- Campaign finance and Political finance
- UK corporate law
- Harper v. Canada [2004] SCR 827
- Buckley v Valeo, 424 U.S. 1 (1976)
- Citizens United v FEC, US (2010)
- McCutcheon v. FEC (2014)
- R (ProLife Alliance) v. BBC [2003] UKHL 23, BBC could refuse to broadcast graphic footage for an anti-abortion political party under the Broadcasting Act 1990 s 6(1)(a)
- Political Parties, Elections and Referendums Act 2000 Schs 9 and 10
- Companies Act 2006 ss 362–379
