= Plon (Society) v. France =

French legal case about confidentiality

In the case of PLON (SOCIETE) v. FRANCE where indirectly the court protected the dead president’s private life and dignity against the publishing company stating that the interim ban on distribution of the book until such time as the relevant courts had ruled on its compatibility with medical confidentiality and the rights of others could be regarded as “necessary in a democratic society” for the protection of the rights of François Mitterrand and his heirs and successors.
