= Leela Förderkreis E.V. and Others v. Germany =

European Court of Human Rights case

Leela Förderkreis e.V. and Others v. Germany (application No. 58911/00) was a case decided by the European Court of Human Rights in 2008.

== Facts ==
The applicants were religious or meditation associations belonging to the Osho movement. As part of their public relations work, German federal agencies characterised these associations as a "sect", "youth sect", "youth religion" and "psycho-sect". The government issued several warnings about the sect using adjectives like "destructive" and "pseudo-religious" to describe them, and the accusation was raised that their members are manipulated. The applicants claimed the Government's informational campaign was an unjustified interference under Article 9 of the European Convention on Human Rights (freedom to exercise religion). The Federal Constitutional Court, after more than 11 years of consideration, decided that the use of the expressions "destructive", and "pseudo-religious" on the associations, and the allegation that they "manipulated their members", did not satisfy the requirements of constitutional law. However, it found that the Government was authorised to characterise the applicant associations' movement as a "sect", "youth religion", "youth sect" and "psycho-sect" and was allowed to provide the public with adequate information about it.

== Judgment ==
The Court held that the length of the proceedings was excessive and failed to meet the "reasonable time" requirement. Therefore, it has found a breach of Article 6 § 1 of the European Convention on Human Rights (rights to fair trial), unanimously.

Concerning allegations of violating Article 9 (freedom of thought, conscience and religion), the Court held that "the Government's statements as delimited by the Federal Constitutional Court, at least at the time they were made, did not entail overstepping the bounds of what a democratic State may regard as the public interest."

Two judges, Trajkovska and Kalaydjieva, filed partially dissenting opinions, considering that Article 9 was violated (Kalaydjieva saw also Article 14 as violated).
