= National Deaf Life Museum =

Museum in Washington, D.C., U.S.

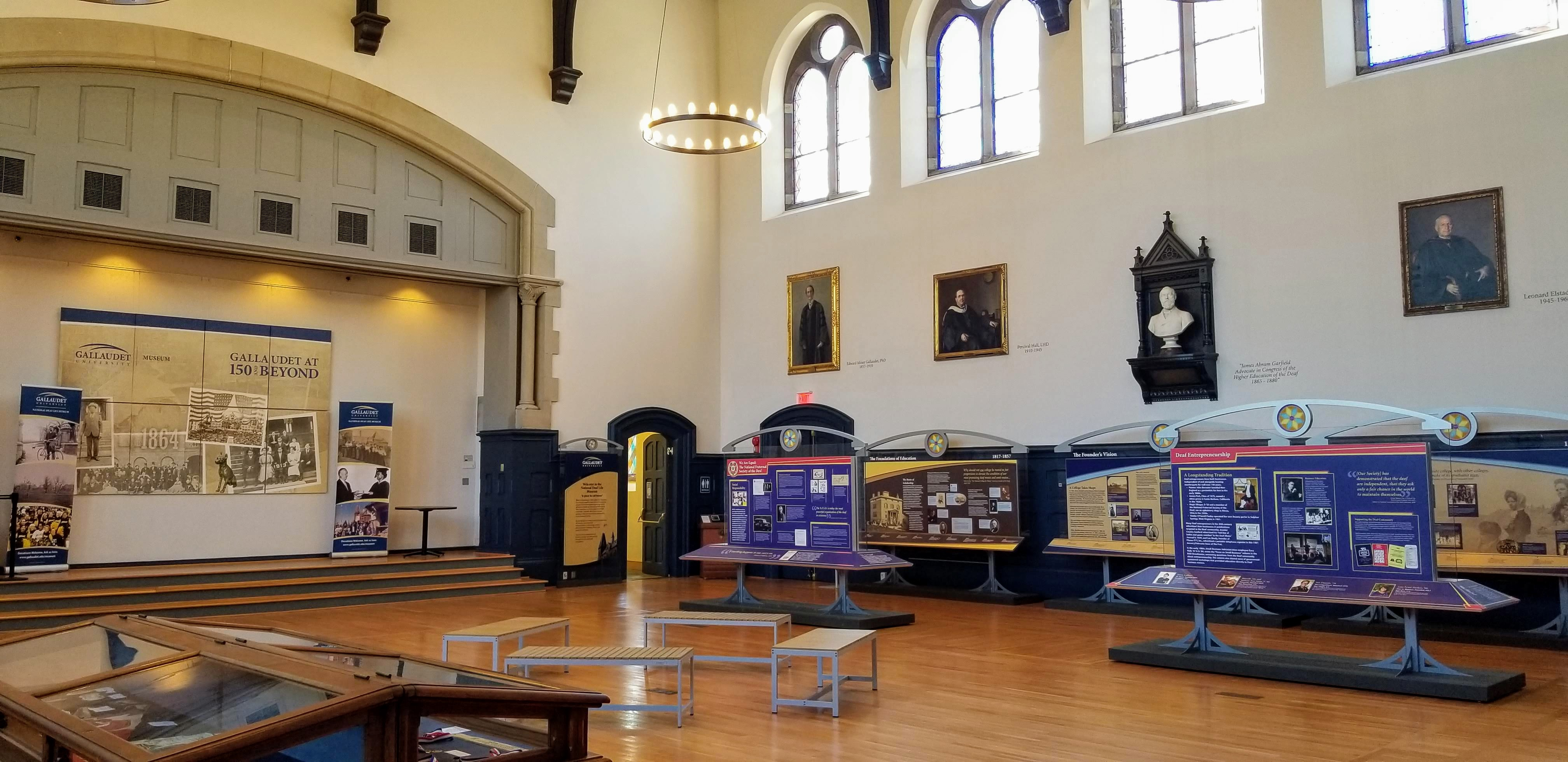
- Museum interior in September 2022

- Location within Washington, D.C.
- Former name: Gallaudet University Museum
- Established: 2007
- Location: Gallaudet University, Washington D.C., US
- Coordinates: 38.90578°N 76.9946°W
- Type: Cultural museum
- Founder: Jane Norman
- Director: Tabitha Jacques
- Public transit access: NoMa–Gallaudet U station
- Website: gallaudet.edu/museum/

The National Deaf Life Museum is a museum focusing on the culture and history of deaf and hard of hearing people in the United States. Founded in 2007 as the Gallaudet University Museum, the museum is operated by Gallaudet University and located on the school's campus in Washington, D.C. The museum formally opened in 2014 and changed its name to the National Deaf Life Museum in 2019.

== Mission ==
The institution's mission statement reads: "The National Deaf Life Museum at Gallaudet University promotes and interprets the rich and complex deaf experience through exhibits and programming on campus and online." The museum creates exhibits, displays artifacts and artwork, and shares experiences and stories about the lives of deaf people in the United States, with special attention to the role of Gallaudet students and alumni.

Museum Director Meredith Peruzzi describes the NDLM "as serving 'a dual role' for [its] visitors. For members of the Deaf community, it is a place to see themselves, learn about their history, and develop their sense of personal identity. [...] For hearing visitors, it offers a chance to learn about our culture, examine their own expectations and experiences of Deaf people, and feel the vibrancy of our signing community.'"

== History and location ==
In 1985, Jack R. Gannon and Rosalyn Lee Gannon established the Gallaudet Museum, located in Chapel Hall, but the museum closed the next year due to insufficient staffing.

Gallaudet professor Jane Norman began working to reestablish the museum in 2007; she served as the Gallaudet University Museum director and curator from 2007 to 2013. The museum formally opened in April 2014 as part of the university's 150th anniversary celebrations. Meredith Peruzzi became the director and curator in 2014. The museum was renamed the National Deaf Life Museum in 2019 to recognize the scope of the museum reaching beyond the Gallaudet campus.

The museum is located in Chapel Hall, which was known at its opening in 1870 as the Main Central Building. Since 2013, the museum's operations office has been located in the campus Gate House.

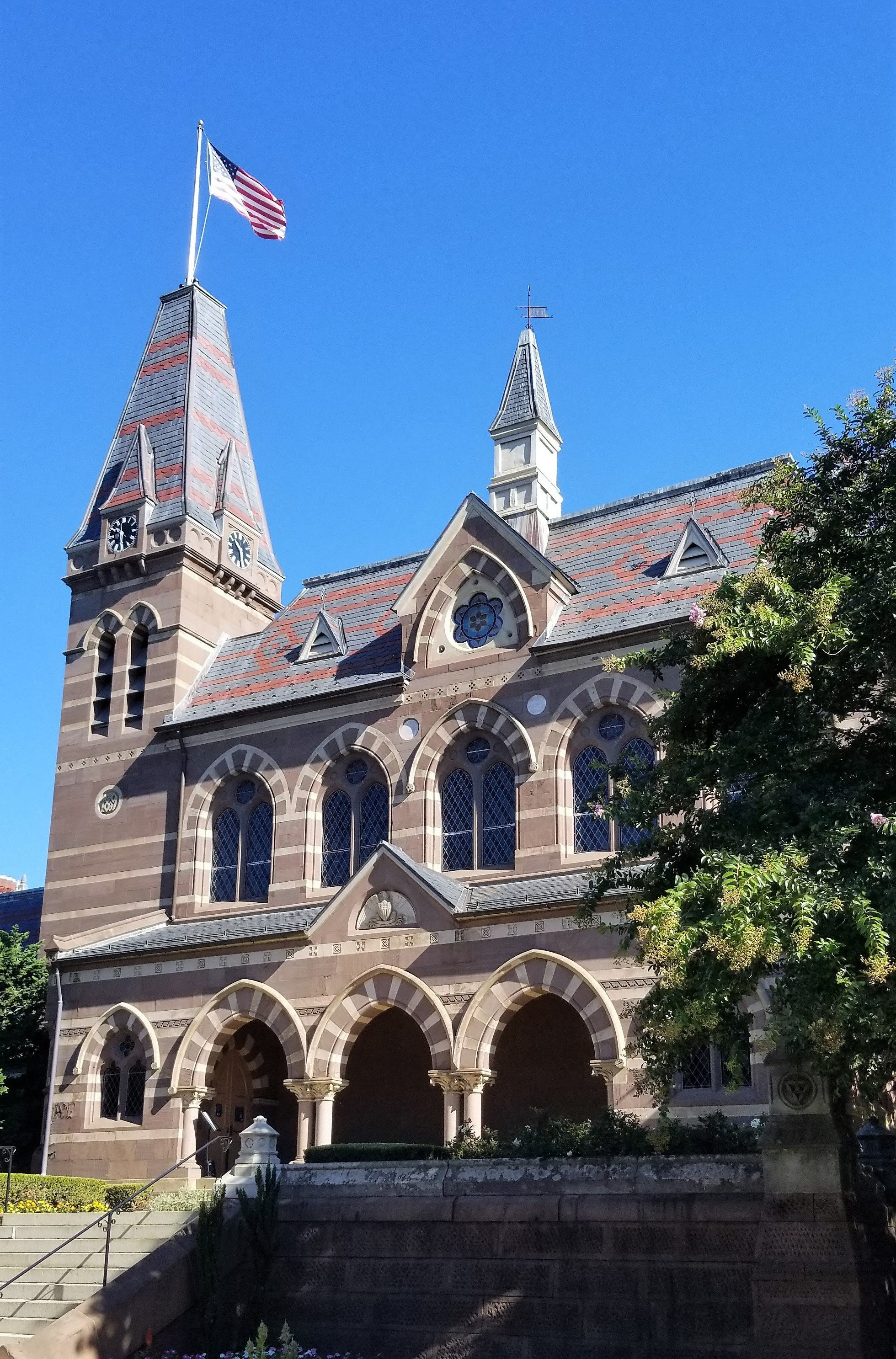
Chapel Hall, the location of the National Deaf Life Museum

== Exhibits ==
Since 2009, the National Deaf Life Museum has created exhibits about Gallaudet University and deaf history and culture in the U.S. more broadly. The museum's information about the Gallaudet community includes campus traditions such as the rat funeral carried out by freshmen and significant coverage of the 1988 Deaf President Now protests. Many of the exhibits created by the museum have an online component.

A selection of exhibits includes:

- Olof Hanson, Conspicuous Leader, 1862–1933, featuring an overview of the life of deaf architect, advocate, and clergyman Olof Hanson
- Making a Difference: Deaf Peace Corps Volunteers, telling the stories of deaf people who served in the Peace Corps
- Then and Now, showing the Gallaudet campus in its early days as compared with the 2010s
- Andrew J. Foster: Missionary, Educator, and Advocate, focusing on the first Black deaf student to graduate from Gallaudet after the Civil Rights movement, Andrew Jackson Foster
- Deaf HERstory, focusing on deaf women's lives, education, and activism
- The Life of Robert Panara, '45 & H-'86, a traveling exhibit from the National Technical Institute for the Deaf highlighting NTID's cofounder, Robert Panara
- Deaf Difference + Space Survival, sharing the story of the Gallaudet Eleven, who contributed to NASA's Space Race studies of motion sickness and weightlessness
- We are Equal: The National Fraternal Society of the Deaf, sharing the history of the National Fraternal Society for the Deaf
- Language, Culture, Communities: 200 Years of Impact by the American School for the Deaf, a traveling exhibit about the American School for the Deaf
- History Through Deaf Eyes, part of Gallaudet's "Deaf Eyes" project including a 90-minute documentary and book of photographs
- Gallaudet at 150 and Beyond, recognizing the university's sesquicentennial celebration

Prior to the COVID-19 pandemic, the museum received roughly 8,000 visitors per year.
