= Osmanoğlu and Kocabaş v. Switzerland =

European Court of Human Rights case

Osmanoğlu and Kocabaş v. Switzerland was a case heard by the European Court of Human Rights in a chamber judgement concerning whether mandatory mixed-gender swimming for girls against the will of their Muslim parents who objected on religious grounds violated Article 9 of the European Convention on Human Rights by contravening religious freedom. On 10 January 2017 the court unanimously found that the convention had not been violated.

The case concerned parents of Turkish origin and Muslim faith, residing in Switzerland, who refused on religious grounds to permit their two daughters (born 1999 and 2001) to take part in compulsory swimming lessons at their public school because in their view mixed-gendered swimming violated the requirement in Islam for females to be properly covered in front of males. In 2010, the authorities ordered the parents to pay a fine of 1,400 Swiss francs, about 1,292 euros, because their daughters had not taken the required class. According to the school, as the girls had not yet reached puberty they did not qualify for an exemption from swimming lessons under Swiss law. In 2011 the parents brought a case in a local court, which dismissed their claims, and in 2012 a Swiss federal court likewise dismissed the case with a finding that the parents' right to freedom of religion had not been violated.

In a unanimous chamber decision on 10 January 2017, the European Court of Human Rights ruled that states had a wide margin of discretion with regard to the balance between religious freedom and the state's wish to educate pupils according to their tradition and needs. It put emphasis on the fact that in the opinion of the court the school had shown flexibility by offering to allow the girls to swim in burkinis and to change their clothes in a room with no boys present. It further found that it was important for social integration, particularly for children of foreign origins, that pupils take full part in their education and not be exempted because of their parental background.

The court thus found that the Swiss authorities had been within their rights when they fined the girls' parents, also saying that the fine in this case was proportional to the aim pursued and not an unduly harsh punishment.

As a chamber judgment, the result may be appealed to the Grand Chamber.
