= Gallaudet Eleven =

Group of deaf men recruited to study weightlessness

The Gallaudet Eleven were a group of eleven deaf men recruited in the late 1950s and 1960s to participate in a joint research program led by NASA and the U.S. Naval School of Aviation Medicine (later changed to Aerospace Medical Association) to study the effects of prolonged weightlessness on the human body. They were selected for participation in the study because damage they had sustained to the vestibular systems of their inner ears had granted them immunity to motion sickness, making them uniquely resilient to certain physical studies that would have made other test subjects nauseous.

== History ==
In the 1960s, the Gallaudet Eleven were recruited from Gallaudet College (now Gallaudet University) for a study on how spaceflight might affect the human body, conducted in Pensacola, Florida by NASA and the U.S. Naval School of Aviation Medicine (NSAM). The study was directed by Captain Ashton Graybiel, a cardiologist who had previously led similar studies for NASA and NSAM.

The men selected were Harold Domich, Robert Greenmun, Barron Gulak, Raymond Harper, Jerald Jordan, Harry Larson, David Myers, Donald Peterson, Raymond Piper, Alvin Steele, and John Zakutney. During the decade of studies, Robert Greenmun wrote many letters to his family, which provided a vivid written record of the Gallaudet Eleven's experiences as test subjects. These letters have been donated to Gallaudet University for exhibition use by the Drs. John S. and Betty J. Schuchman Deaf Documentary Center and preservation in Gallaudet University's Deaf Collections and Archives.

== Experiments ==
The study consisted of a wide variety of tests in which subjects were challenged to perform physically and mentally demanding tasks while experiencing accelerations from things like centrifuges, zero-gravity flights, and other devices. Among other metrics, researchers evaluated the subjects' performance using urine tests, blood pressure recordings, electrocardiograms, eye tracking, and self-reporting from the subjects.

=== The Slow Rotation Room ===
The Slow Rotation Room (SRR) was a 20-foot diameter circular room in which subjects lived for periods up to two consecutive days. Across multiple trials, the room was made to rotate at speeds ranging from 2.4 to 10.0 rotations per minute. The room was equipped with all the necessities for basic living, including a sink, refrigerator, stove, shower, and toilet, so its rotation had to be paused only for occasional supply deliveries and visits from researchers. Of the four test subjects who lived in the SRR, the only member of the Gallaudet Eleven was Robert Greenmun, who served as a control subject for the experiment. The other subjects were researchers and Navy medical officers who did not have Greenmun's immunity to motion sickness.

In a series of 1959 letters, Greenmun described a few of the tests that subjects performed in the SRR. They included games involving throwing tennis balls, basketballs, and darts at targets, tests of dexterity in which subjects were to place styluses into small holes, balancing tests where subjects attempted to walk in straight lines, and a "dial test", in which subjects were instructed to set the positions of dials which were placed all around them, requiring the subjects to frequently rotate their heads and bodies.

=== Coriolis Acceleration Platform ===
The Coriolis Acceleration Platform (CAP) was the successor to the SRR. It was a 20-foot diameter circular room that could spin at speeds up to 10 revolutions per minute. In addition, it could travel down a 40-foot linear track and tilt in angular directions. The room was entirely closed off from the outside, equipped with no windows and a set of cameras that researchers used to observe subjects from an external control room. Like the SRR, the CAP included all the necessities for living, including running water, a refrigerator, a toilet, a television, bedding, and a dining space.

In 1964, Greenmun, Harper, Larson, and Myers spent between 17 and 18 days in the CAP, with 12 of those days being consecutive. While the CAP was running, it would stop only for a few minutes each day for supplies to be dropped off and for researchers to visit. Much of the testing in the CAP was the same as the SRR, with the addition of some new tests, including one where subjects were presented with a two-by-two grid of lights that could each flash a number. The subjects were to perform varying calculations in quick succession depending on the arrangement of two random numbers flashed in the grid. Greenmun reports having developed certain habits of movement while living in the CAP and SRR that made it difficult to readjust to normal rooms in the first hours after the end of a trial. For example, he and other subjects were unable to walk without stumbling or to throw a ball in a straight line for a short period of time after they left the CAP and SRR.

=== Elevator Rides and the Human Disorientation Device (HDD) ===
In another set of experiments, participants were subject to larger accelerations, but for shorter periods of time. In one such study, subjects rode inside a machine called the Human Disorientation Device (HDD), a cylindrical cabin attached to large machinery that could move and rotate in multiple directions, designed to simulate the accelerations of a spinning satellite. In another, subjects rode one of the express elevators in the Empire State Building, repeatedly traveling between the first and 80th floors. Some rides were carried out in total darkness, while in others, participants were subject to bursts of light from flash bulbs, which produced afterimages that they reported to the researchers. In some cases, electrodes were wired to the areas around the subject's eyes, which allowed researchers to monitor ocular motions during rides.

=== Saint Pierre and Miquelon ===
In 1964, ten of the Gallaudet Eleven took a ferry ride on a 145-foot (44 m) long tugboat through a 200-mile (320 km) stretch of the North Atlantic Seas between St. Pierre and Miquelon and North Sydney, Nova Scotia, a journey that lasted 28 hours. These waters were known to be some of the roughest in the North Atlantic, and the team of researchers intentionally scheduled a voyage through a storm. Researchers observed 40-foot (12 m) waves, 40-knot winds, and 80-knot gusts in addition to accelerations exceeding 3 times that of gravity. Participants were subject to similar tests as in previous experiments, including blood and urine analysis, physical tests of steadiness, and questionnaires for self-reporting. The research staff and other non-deaf people on board experienced extreme seasickness and vomiting, while those part of the Gallaudet Eleven were largely unaffected, with some even reporting that they enjoyed the experience.

== Legacy ==
For their contributions to the understanding of motion sickness and the physiological and mental effects of prolonged accelerations on the human body, the Gallaudet Eleven have been recognized in museum exhibits and other ceremonies. On April 11, 2017, the National Deaf Life Museum at Gallaudet University opened an on-campus exhibit called Deaf Difference + Space Survival featuring over 150 photographs and various footage, letters, and scientific reports documenting the Gallaudet Eleven's experiences. In April 2018, Harry Larson, David Myers, and James Greenmun (Robert Greenmun's son) were invited to NASA's Johnson Space Center to receive a special presentation and a tour of various facilities to thank them for their contributions and to show them the impacts of the research they participated in. Modern day motion sickness research is carried out, among other topics, at the Ashton Graybiel Spatial Orientation Laboratory at Brandeis University.
