= Meredith Peruzzi =

American historian and Director of the National Deaf Life Museum

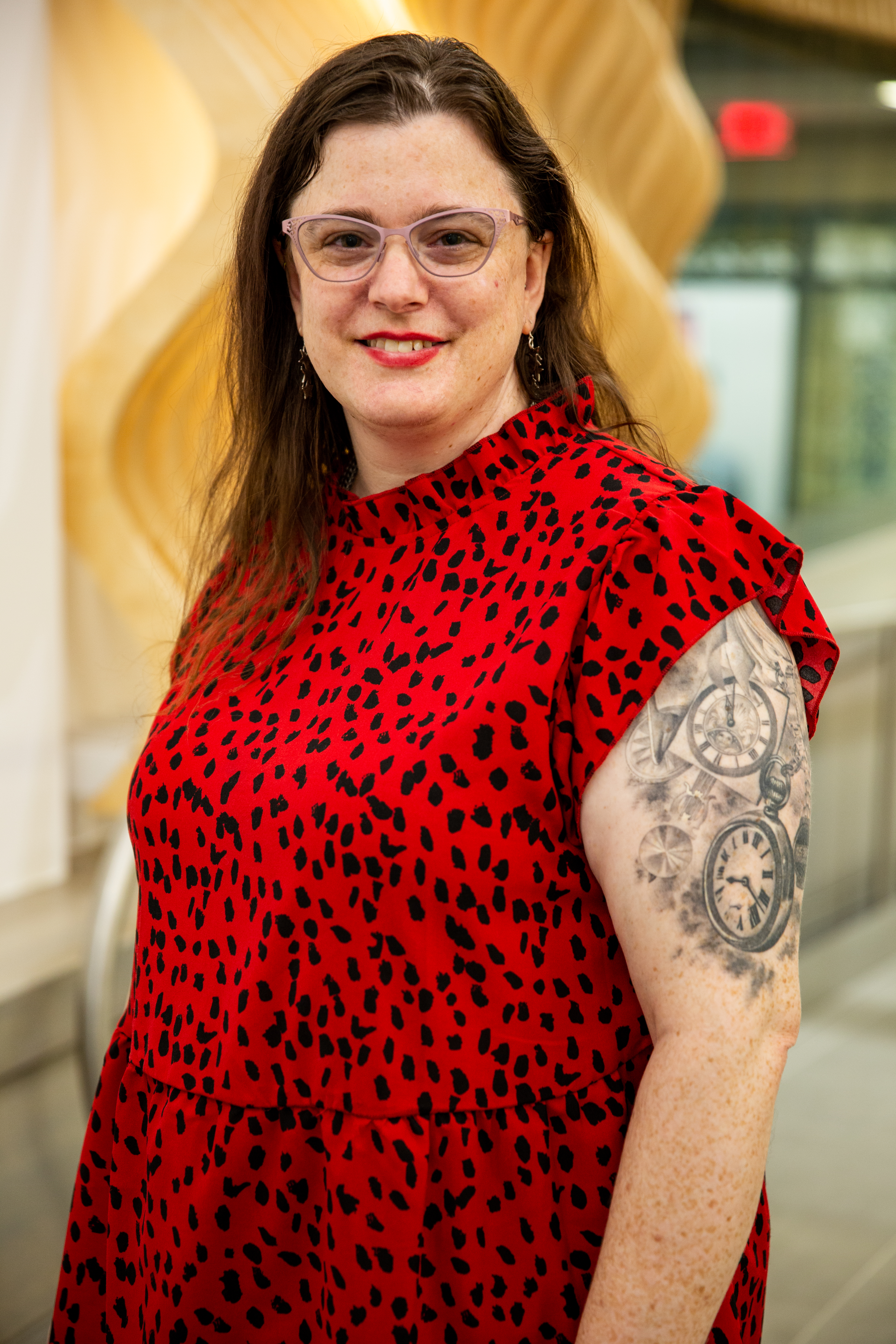
Meredith Peruzzi

Meredith Peruzzi (born c. 1980) is an American historian, museum professional, and accessibility activist.

== Early life and education ==
Peruzzi grew up in Columbia, Maryland, and attended Wilde Lake High School, where she was the captain of the quiz team. She has a B.A. in Deaf Studies with a minor in History from Gallaudet University (2011), where she was on a team that took first place in the National Association of the Deaf College Bowl in 2008. Her honors project at Gallaudet was a book called Gallaudet at 150: Chapter One, covering campus history from 1857 to 1880. After college she spent a year in Tokyo teaching American Sign Language. She received her M.A. in history from George Mason University in 2018, with concentrations in U.S. History and Applied History. She is pursuing doctoral work at the University of Leicester, in the field of Museum, Gallery, and Heritage Practice. Her current doctoral research "applies Critical Disability Theory to the issue of deaf visitors developing a sense of belonging in museum spaces."

== Career ==
Peruzzi is a public historian with research interests that lie in the area of nineteenth- and twentieth-century American Deaf history. Her first work in museums was in 1991 volunteering for the Baltimore City Life Museums. After leaving BCLM, she returned to her first alma mater, where she went to work with Jane Norman, the founder of the Gallaudet University Museum, which saw approximately 8,000 visitors each year. Upon Norman's retirement in June 2013, Peruzzi became the Director in January 2014 and remained in that position through December 2024.

Under her leadership the museum changed its name from the Gallaudet University Museum to the National Deaf Life Museum (NDLM), showcasing the history of the Deaf community as well as Gallaudet. She created and curated an exhibit at NDLM about Gallaudet history titled Gallaudet at 150 and Beyond.

Peruzzi's museum interests lie in making museums more Deaf-friendly, particularly in the areas of music- and sound-themed exhibits. She also wants museums to alter their relationship with tech-based accessibility, engaging in dialogue with disabled people so that museums can go beyond basic ADA compliance when providing exhibits, displays and interactive opportunities.

Upon leaving Gallaudet, Peruzzi founded Echo Spark Consulting, providing museology consulting services within the deaf community, and accessibility consulting within the museum community.

At the 12th annual Deaf History International Conference (DHI) in Ghent, Belgium, Peruzzi was elected as the DHI Vice President.
