= Handyside =

Handyside is the name of:

== Surname ==
Notable people with the surname include:

- Andrew Dods Handyside (1835-1904), South Australian politician
- George Handyside (1821–1904), English businessman
- Peter Handyside (born 1974), Scottish footballer
- William Handyside (1793–1850), Scottish engineer

== Other uses ==
- Handyside, Stokesley, historic building in England

== See also ==
- Andrew Handyside and Company
- Handyside Bridge, former railway bridge in Derbyshire, United Kingdom
- Handyside v United Kingdom, European Court of Human Rights case
- Hundred of Handyside, a cadastral unit in South Australia.
