= Buscarini and Others v San Marino =

Buscarini and Others v. San Marino (application No. 24645/94) was a case decided by the European Court of Human Rights in 1999.

== Facts ==
The applicants, Cristoforo Buscarini and Emilio Della Balda, were elected to the Grand and General Council (the parliament of the Republic of San Marino) in 1993. They requested permission from the Captains Regent to take the oath required by the Elections Act without reference to any religious text. The Act referred to a decree of 27 June 1909, which laid down the wording of the oath to be taken by members of the parliament as follows: "I, ..., swear on the Holy Gospels ...". The applicants originally took the oath in writing, omitting the reference to Gospels. Their oath was considered invalid, and the applicants took the oath on the Gospels, maintaining their protest.

== Proceedings and judgment ==
In 1997, the European Court of Human Rights concluded unanimously that there had been a violation of Article 9. The Sammarinese government maintained that the reaffirmation of traditional values represented by the taking of the oath was necessary in order to maintain public order.

The Court concluded that "requiring the applicants to take the oath on the Gospels was tantamount to requiring two elected representatives of the people to swear allegiance to a particular religion, a requirement which is not compatible with Article 9 of the Convention. As the ECHR rightly stated in its report, it would be contradictory to make the exercise of a mandate intended to represent different views of society within Parliament subject to a prior declaration of commitment to a particular set of beliefs" (Para. 39). The Court unanimously held that there was a violation of Article 9 of the ECHR (freedom of conscience).
