= Jane Norman (American deaf activist) =

American deaf performer (1939–2020)

- Jane Norman
- Born: Nellie Jane Norman; September 11, 1939; Covington, Virginia, United States
- Died: April 4, 2020 (aged 80); Riverside, California, United States
- Education: Virginia School for the Deaf and the Blind (1957); Gallaudet University (B.A., 1968); New York University (M.A.); Howard University (Ph.D., 1995)
- Occupation(s): Performer, director, professor, and curator
- Years active: 1960s–2020
- Known for: Advocacy for deaf culture, American Sign Language, and art; Founding the National Deaf Life Museum at Gallaudet University
- Spouse: Edward Wilk (divorced)
- Parent(s): Frances Christine Thomas Norman and Fred Gene Norman
- Relatives: Freda Norman (sister)

Nellie Jane Norman (September 11, 1939 – April 4, 2020) was a deaf performer, director, professor, and curator, recognized for her work on the faculty of Gallaudet University. She actively promoted deaf culture, language, and art through her contributions to teaching, TV programs, and film festivals. In 2007, she founded the National Deaf Life Museum at Gallaudet.

== Early life ==
Born in Covington, Virginia, Nellie Jane Norman, known as Jane, was the child of Frances Christine Thomas Norman and Fred Gene Norman. Both of her parents, as well as her sister Freda Norman, a future actress, were deaf. Norman grew up in Alexandria.

Norman, who was also deaf, studied in mainstream schools until she was 11, then attended the Virginia School for the Deaf and the Blind, graduating in 1957.

== Education and early career ==
Norman enrolled at Gallaudet University, but took time off after two years to work in the printing industry. After training at the Milo Bennett Linotype School in Indiana, she worked in printing around Washington, D.C., and in New York City. She became a member of the International Typographical Union, a labor union that her father had also been a member of, which was unusual for a deaf person at the time. Her union membership as a deaf woman despite a history of arbitrary restrictions was a source of pride for Norman.

She then returned to Gallaudet and graduated in 1968 with a degree in English literature. As an undergraduate at Gallaudet she married Edward Wilk, but they divorced after 17 months; Norman continued to use the name Jane Wilk for a period of her professional life before returning to the name Jane Norman.

== Performing career ==
After graduation, she moved to New York, where she got a master's degree in educational theater from New York University. While studying at NYU, she became an actress with the National Theatre of the Deaf.

After two years with the National Theater of the Deaf, she moved to San Francisco. There, she was an anchor on NewSign, the country's first newscast specifically for the deaf, on KRON-TV, which was an NBC affiliate at the time.

Along with Peter Wechsberg, she won a local Emmy Award for her work on NewSign in 1971. In San Francisco in the 1970s, she also worked for DEAF Media on Rainbow’s End, a PBS show for deaf children.

In addition to her work as an actress and anchor, Norman was a director, producer, and film judge, as well as a media consultant. In the mid-1980s, she led the production of Gallaudet's Emmy-winning nationally televised show Deaf Mosaic.

== Academic career ==
Norman returned to school and received a Ph.D. from Howard University in 1995. She joined the faculty at Gallaudet University in the late 1980s, first working in the Department of Theater, where she founded the university's first touring performance company. On its founding in 1990, she joined the faculty of the Department of Television, Film, and Digital Media, serving as its chair. Beginning in 2002, she was involved in the Communication Studies program in the university's Department of Art, Communication, and Theatre.

An activist for deaf rights, Norman was actively involved in the Deaf President Now movement in the late 1980s, serving as the Deaf President Now Council's co-director of media relations.

Her research at the university focused on the depiction of deaf people in media. She spearheaded the 1989 Deaf Way festival and coordinated the International Deaf Film Festival at Deaf Way 2 in 2002. In 2010, she led the WORLDEAF Cinema Festival at Gallaudet.

Beginning in 2007, Norman worked to establish the National Deaf Life Museum, serving as its director and curator. The museum opened in April 2014. In her retirement, she continued to serve as director emerita of the National Deaf Life Museum, until her death in 2020 in Riverside, California.
