= Denise Bindschedler-Robert =

Swiss international lawyer and professor (1920-2008)

Denise Marcelle Bindschler-Robert (July 10, 1920 in Saint-Imier - November 17, 2008 in Bern) was a Swiss international lawyer who was professor at the Graduate Institute of International and Development Studies in Geneva. From 1975 to 1991, she served as a judge at the European Court of Human Rights in respect of Switzerland. In 1966, she was elected as the first woman in the synodal council of the Christian Catholic Church in Switzerland, to which she belonged until 1985.
