= Jersild v. Denmark =

Jersild v. Denmark was a case decided by the European Court of Human Rights in 1994.

== Facts ==
Jens Olaf Jersild, a journalist, had conducted and edited a TV interview with members of a group of young people, calling themselves "the Greenjackets" (Grønjakkerne), who made abusive and derogatory remarks about immigrants and ethnic groups in Denmark during the interview. The youths were charged with hate crimes under Danish law for their comments.

Later, Mr. Jersild was convicted of aiding and abetting "the Greenjackets" in committing these hate crimes.

== Judgment ==
The court held by twelve votes to seven, that Denmark violated Article 10 ECHR (freedom of expression), stressing that "the applicant’s conduct during the interviews clearly dissociated him from the persons interviewed" (Para. 34).

Judges Ryssdal, Bernhardt, Spielmann and Loizou expressed a dissent, stating that "it was absolutely necessary to add at least a clear statement of disapproval" (Para. 3). Judges Gölcüklü, Russo and Valticos have filed a shorter dissenting opinion, stating that "the journalist responsible for the broadcast in question made no real attempt to challenge the points of view he was presenting, which was necessary if their impact was to be counterbalanced".
