= Lingens v. Austria =

Lingens v Austria (1986) 8 EHRR 407 was a 1986 European Court of Human Rights case that placed restrictions on libel laws because of the freedom of expression provisions of Article 10 of the European Convention on Human Rights.

== Context ==
Peter Michael Lingens was fined for publishing in a Vienna magazine (Profil) comments about the behavior of the Austrian Chancellor, such as 'basest opportunism', 'immoral' and 'undignified'. Under the Austrian criminal code the only defense was proof of the truth of these statements. Lingens could not prove the truth of these value judgments.

== Judgment ==
The European Court of Human Rights stated that a careful distinction needed to be made between facts and value judgments/opinions. The existence of facts can be demonstrated, whereas the truth of value judgments is not susceptible of proof. The facts on which Lingens founded his value judgments were not disputed; nor was his good faith. Since it was impossible to prove the truth of value judgments, the requirement of the relevant provisions of the Austrian criminal code was impossible of fulfilment and infringed article 10 of the convention.
