= Society for the Protection of Unborn Children =

United Kingdom anti-abortion organization

- Formation: January 1967; 59 years ago
- Founder: Phyllis Bowman
- Type: Anti-abortion lobby group
- Headquarters: London, United Kingdom
- Website: www.spuc.org.uk

Society for the Protection of Unborn Children is an anti-abortion organisation in the United Kingdom which also opposes assisted suicide, emergency contraception and birth control.

== History ==
SPUC was formed in 1966 amid parliamentary debates over the Abortion Act, which came into law one year later. Although it is not officially faith-based, SPUC and the more conservative anti-abortion charity Life mainly draw upon Catholic and evangelical Protestant support.

SPUC founder Phyllis Bowman resigned from her post in July 1999, with nearly half of the 12-person national executive resigning in sympathy. This was believed to be because of a rift with SPUC national director John Smeaton over the organisation's strategies.

The Pro-Life All-Party Parliamentary Group, headed by the then-Shadow Home Secretary, Ann Widdecombe, met with SPUC to discuss concerns that following Bowman's resignation, the organisation may divert resources from the political arena and seek greater realignment with the Catholic Church, alienating some Protestant, Muslim and atheist supporters of SPUC.

In 2022 the BBC removed SPUC resources from its website after a "backlash from health experts". The Guardian referred to SPUC's "history of promoting misinformation in schools". In May 2023, The Herald reported that lawyers acting for SPUC issued a legal threat towards a teacher in Scotland over an abortion education petition. The letter sent to the teacher said that her allegations that SPUC had spread misinformation were false and defamatory.

== Views ==
SPUC have opposed same-sex marriage.

SPUC opposed locked-in syndrome sufferer Tony Nicklinson's legal battle for the right to assisted suicide.

On 18 June 2019, the Nottingham Post reported that the organisation did a leaflet drop in Sneinton, Nottingham alongside a letter for parents asking for their child to be withdrawn from Relationships and Sex Education (RSE) lessons. The Nottingham Post reported that some residents in the area condemned the action and, in an interview on BBC Radio Nottingham, the leader of Nottingham City Council confirmed that no letters had been handed in at any school.
