= Necessary in a democratic society =

Test in the European Convention on Human Rights

"Necessary in a democratic society" is a test found in Articles 8–11 of the European Convention on Human Rights, which provides that the state may impose restrictions of these rights only if such restrictions are "necessary in a democratic society" and proportional to the legitimate aims enumerated in each article. According to the Council of Europe's handbook on the subject, the phrase is "arguably one of the most important clauses in the entire Convention". Indeed, the Court has itself written that "the concept of a democratic society ... prevails throughout the Convention". The purpose of making such claims justiciable is to ensure that the restriction is actually necessary, rather than enacted for political expediency, which is not allowed. Articles 8–11 of the convention are those that protect right to family life, freedom of religion, freedom of speech, and freedom of association respectively. Along with the other tests which are applied to these articles, the restrictions on Articles 8–11 have been described as "vast limitations", in contrast to American law which recognizes nearly unlimited right to freedom of speech under the First Amendment.

== Case law ==
In the case law of the European Court of Human Rights, "necessary in a democratic society" is further defined as meeting a "pressing social need" and "relevant and sufficient" to a legitimate aim. The court has defined "necessary" as somewhere between "reasonable" or "desirable" and "indispensable". When defining what constitutes a "democratic society" for the purposes of the test, the Court considers that freedom of speech is one of its foundations (hence restrictions on it must be narrow and focused). The court also considers that "democracy does not simply mean that the views of a majority must always prevail" and that "a balance must be achieved which ensures the fair and proper treatment of minorities and avoids any abuse of a dominant position". In the Greek case (1969), the European Commission of Human Rights found that restrictions imposed by the Greek junta on freedom of association were a violation of the Convention because they worked to create a "police state, which is the antithesis of a 'democratic society'".

== Relevant cases ==
The test was developed in the Handyside v. United Kingdom, Silver v. United Kingdom, and Lingens v. Austria cases, related to freedom of expression. It has also been invoked in cases involving state surveillance, which the court acknowledges can constitute an Article 8 violation but may be "strictly necessary for safeguarding the democratic institutions" (Klass and Others v. Germany). The court has also held that restrictions on obscenity and blasphemy may satisfy the requirement of being "necessary in a democratic society", something which is not disputed even by the minority of judges who disagree that such bans are compatible with the convention. It has recently caused controversy in cases where a burqa ban has been judged "necessary in a democratic society" (e.g. in S.A.S. v. France). Article 10 cases related to freedom of expression typically do not involve a dispute as to whether interference took place, but whether it was justified as necessary in a democratic society.

== See also ==
- Section 1 of the Canadian Charter of Rights and Freedoms
