= Human rights in Latvia =

Human rights in Latvia are generally respected by the government, according to the US Department of State and Freedom House. Latvia is ranked above-average among the world's sovereign states in democracy, press freedom, privacy and human development. The country has a relatively large ethnic Russian community, which has basic rights guaranteed under the constitution and international human rights laws ratified by the Latvian government.

However, human rights organisations have reported multiple problems. Especially non-citizens – including stateless persons – suffer from limited or no access to a broad range of rights. Also there were problems with police abuse of detainees and arrestees, poor prison conditions and overcrowding, judicial corruption, discrimination against women, incidents of violence against ethnic minorities, and societal violence and incidents of government discrimination against homosexuals.

In March 2020, Latvia derogated from some of its obligations under ECHR and ICCPR, having referred to the COVID-19 outbreak.

== Latvia in the international human rights system ==
As of the end of 2019, the European Court of Human Rights has delivered 144 judgments in cases against Latvia (beginning from 2001); in 115 cases, it has found violations of the European Convention on Human Rights or its protocols.

UN Human Rights Committee has adopted views in three cases involving Latvia, as at 2020, in two cases finding violation of ICCPR (Raihman v. Latvia and Ignatāne v. Latvia). In 2001, Latvia has extended a standing invitation to Special Procedures of UN Human Rights Council. In 1990, Latvia has acceded to UDHR in an atypical move, which is understood in jurisprudence as accepting the declaration as binding.

=== Participation in basic human rights treaties ===
UN core treaties	Participation of Latvia	CoE core treaties	Participation of Latvia
Convention on the Elimination of All Forms of Racial Discrimination	Accession in 1992, declaration allowing individual complaints isn't made	European Convention on Human Rights	Ratified in 1997
International Covenant on Civil and Political Rights	Accession in 1992	Protocol 1 (ECHR)	Ratified in 1997
First Optional Protocol (ICCPR)	Accession in 1994	Protocol 4 (ECHR)	Ratified in 1997
Second Optional Protocol (ICCPR)	Accession in 2013	Protocol 6 (ECHR)	Ratified in 1999
International Covenant on Economic, Social and Cultural Rights	Accession in 1992	Protocol 7 (ECHR)	Ratified in 1997
Convention on the Elimination of All Forms of Discrimination Against Women	Accession in 1992	Protocol 12 (ECHR)	Signed in 2000
Optional Protocol (CEDAW)	Not signed	Protocol 13 (ECHR)	Ratified in 2012
United Nations Convention Against Torture	Accession in 1992, declaration allowing individual complaints isn't made	European Social Charter	Ratified in 2002
Optional Protocol (CAT)	Not signed	Additional Protocol of 1988 (ESC)	Signed in 1997
Convention on the Rights of the Child	Accession in 1992	Additional Protocol of 1995 (ESC)	Not signed
Optional Protocol on the Involvement of Children in Armed Conflict (CRC)	Ratified in 2005	Revised European Social Charter	Ratified in 2013
Optional Protocol on the sale of children, child prostitution and child pornography (CRC)	Ratified in 2006	European Convention for the Prevention of Torture and Inhuman or Degrading Treatment or Punishment	Ratified in 1998
Convention on the Protection of the Rights of All Migrant Workers and Members of Their Families	Not signed	European Charter for Regional or Minority Languages	Not signed
Convention on the Rights of Persons with Disabilities	Ratified in 2010	Framework Convention for the Protection of National Minorities	Ratified in 2005
Optional Protocol (CRPD)	Ratified in 2010	Convention on Action against Trafficking in Human Beings	Ratified in 2008

=== Latest published documents in reporting procedures ===
Experts' body	State report	Document by experts' body	State response
Human Rights Committee	2012	2014	
Committee on Economic, Social and Cultural Rights	200?	2021	.
Committee on the Elimination of Racial Discrimination	2017	2018	.
Committee Against Torture	2018	2019	.
Committee on the Rights of the Child	2013	2016	.
Committee on the Elimination of Discrimination Against Women	2018	2020	.
European Committee on Social Rights	2020	2020	.
Committee for the Prevention of Torture	not foreseen	2016	2017
FCNM Advisory Committee	2016	2018	2014
European Commission against Racism and Intolerance	not foreseen	2018	2019

== Overviews by human rights organisations ==
=== Amnesty International ===
According to Amnesty International, non-citizens – including stateless persons – suffer from limited or no access to a broad range of rights, including the right to participate in political processes, and the right to employment in the civil service and private sector. The majority of them were born or lived almost their entire lives in Latvia. Non-citizens also have restrictions on property ownership.

Amnesty International reported racially motivated attacks against Romani people. Latvia lacks of comprehensive national legislation dealing with all forms of discrimination. Lesbian, gay, bisexual and transgender (LGBT) people have faced discrimination by verbal abuse. There were reported allegations of deliberate physical ill-treatment of detainees by prison staff.

=== Human Rights Watch ===
Human Rights Watch reported in 2006 the attacks on peaceful lesbian and gay pride activists in Riga on July 28. Earlier, Riga City Council denied an application by lesbian, gay, bisexual and transgender (LGBT) organizations for “Riga Pride 2006”. The banned march was targeted by crowds of anti-gay protesters. In 2009 the gay march was allowed by Administrative Court of Riga.

=== Freedom House ===
According to Freedom House, Latvia has wide civil liberties. Also political rights are in a high level, though the country suffered high-profile corruption scandals during 2007. The government generally respects freedom of speech, freedom of press, and freedom of religion. Academic freedom is respected in law and in practice. Freedom of assembly and association are protected by law and in practice. The highly competitive Latvian mass media are proving to be reliable sources of information and watchdogs against governmental abuses of power.

While the constitutional guarantee of judicial independence is generally respected, corruption in the judicial and law enforcement systems continues to be a problem. Pretrial detentions are long, police use excessive force against detainees, and prisons suffer from overcrowding and inadequate medical care. Women enjoy the same legal rights as men, but they often face employment discrimination.

Alleged discrimination suffered by the Russian-speaking community continues to be debated. Parliament has appointed an ombudsman responsible for protecting the rights of individuals in relation to the government. Two men were sentenced to prison terms in January 2007 for attacking a Rwandan citizen. The case marked the first sentencing under a law prohibiting instigation of racial hatred.

=== United States Department of State ===
According to Human Right Report of United States Department of State, Latvia generally respects the human rights of citizens and the large resident noncitizen community. However, there were problems with serious police abuse of detainees and arrestees, poor conditions at police detention facilities, poor prison conditions and overcrowding, judicial corruption, obstacles to due process, official pressure to limit freedom of speech, violence against women, child abuse, trafficking in persons, incidents of violence against ethnic minorities, and societal violence and incidents of government discrimination against gay people.

== Specific issues of Latvia ==
After the restoration of independence in 1991, those who or whose ancestors had not been citizens of Latvia prior to its Soviet occupation in 1940 were not automatically granted citizenship. As of January 2011, non-citizens exceed 14% of the population. Russian language, being native for more than 37% of residents according to the 2000 census, is considered to be a foreign language in the Official Language Law; the possibilities to use it in communication with authorities and in public education were significantly reduced after 1991.

Like in many post-Communist countries, restitution of real estate has taken place in Latvia. Therefore, a considerable part of former tenants of public housing found themselves in private housing, with higher rent. Rent control for such dwellings was, after multiple extensions, phased out in 2007.

Since 2003, conflicts concerning freedom of assembly are often: on various occasions, gatherings of LGBT and counter-meetings, Remembrance Day of the Latvian Legionnaires and counter-meetings, meetings of the Headquarters for the Protection of Russian Schools were banned or limited.

Limitations to eligibility and their enforcement were in the focus of several ECtHR judgments in cases against Latvia (Ādamsons v. Latvia, Ždanoka v. Latvia, Podkolzina v. Latvia) and UN Human Rights Committee views in case Ignatāne v. Latvia.

== Participation, economic, social and cultural rights in digits ==
In the local elections of 2009, 79.7% of elected councillors indicated their ethnicity as ethnic Latvians, 65.5% were male. In the parliamentary elections of 2014, 81 of 100 elected MPs were males, 71 indicated their ethnicity as ethnic Latvians. For comparison, at the beginning of 2010 ethnic Latvians were 59.4% of the population (and 71.8% among citizens) and women—53.9%.

As of January 2021, the minimum monthly salary is 500 EUR and the minimum old-age pension is 149.6 EUR.

The average calculated age pension in October 2020 was 403.41 EUR. Average net salary in 2019 was EUR 793 (varying from EUR 565 in Latgale to EUR 883 in Riga).

The unemployment rate at the end of November 2020, was 7.4% according to the State Employment Agency, varying between 5.7% in Riga region and 15.1% in Latgale. Ethnic minorities and persons not indicating ethnicity composed 45.5% of the unemployed in the end of December 2014.

Life expectancy at birth was estimated as 75.4 years in 2020. In 2011, there were 6.3 outpatient visits to physicians per capita, 58.8 hospital beds and 39.1 physicians per 10 000 population.

Pre-school education and nine-year basic education are compulsory. Secondary education (forms 10–12) is free in public schools. However, according to the Ombudsman, the constitutional principle of free education is violated by the practice of parents having to buy textbooks. According to the 2000 census, 13.9% of those aged 15 and older and giving answers on own education had obtained higher education. In 2011, 94.6% of basic school (9 years) graduates had continued their studies, as well as 63.6% of secondary school graduates had done.

== Human rights legislation and offices ==
=== National law ===
Human rights are granted by Chapter VIII of the Constitution—"Fundamental Human Rights", adopted in 1998 and consisting of 28 articles. It includes both first-generation and second-generation human rights as well as some third-generation human rights: rights of persons belonging to ethnic minorities and right to live in a benevolent environment. Article 116 defines goals allowing limitations of certain human rights: these are the rights of other people, the democratic structure of the state, public safety, welfare and morals.

Until adopting this chapter the core law in the field of human rights was the Constitutional Law "The Rights and Obligations of a Citizen and a Person", adopted in 1991.

=== Institutions ===
- Since 1990, a committee on human rights exists in the parliament of Latvia (initially it was called Committee on Human Rights and Ethnic Affairs, currently—Human Rights and Public Affairs Committee)
- Since 1996, the Constitutional court exists. Private persons can submit applications concerning their constitutional rights to it since 2001.
- In 1993–1995, the office of State Minister for Human Rights had existed. In 1998, the office of Representative of the Government before International Human Rights Organisations was founded.
- In 1995, National Human Rights Office was created, transformed into Ombudsman's Office since 2007.
- Several NGOs also concern themselves with the state of human rights in Latvia, among them the Latvian Centre for Human Rights and the Latvian Human Rights Committee.

== International rankings ==
- Democracy Index, 2008: 46 out of 167
- Worldwide Press Freedom Index, 2010: 30 out of 178.
- Worldwide Privacy Index, 2007: 13 out of 37.
- Worldwide Quality-of-life Index, 2005: 66 out of 111.
- Human Development Index, 2008: 44 out of 179.
- Freedom in the World, 2008: Political rights score: 2 and Civil liberties score: 1 (1 being most free, 7 least free).
- Global Corruption Report, 2007: 49 out of 163.

== See also ==
- ECtHR cases involving Latvia and decided on merits by the Grand Chamber:
  - Slivenko v. Latvia
  - Ždanoka v. Latvia
  - Andrejeva v. Latvia
  - Kononov v. Latvia
- Internet censorship and surveillance in Latvia
- LGBT rights in Latvia
- Russians in Latvia
- Latvian nationality law

== Literature ==
- Poleshchuk, Vadim, ed. (2009). Chance to Survive: Minority Rights in Estonia and Latvia (PDF). Aleksei Semjonov. Estonia, Moscow, Paris: Institute of Democracy and Cooperation, Foundation for Historical Outlook and Legal Information Centre for Human Rights. ISBN 978-9949-18-818-5. Archived from the original (PDF) on 13 March 2011.
