= Human rights in Estonia =

Human rights in Estonia are acknowledged as being generally respected by the government. Estonia has been classified as a full democracy, with moderate privacy and human development in Europe. Individuals are guaranteed their basic rights under the constitution, legislative acts, and treaties relating to human rights ratified by the Estonian government. As of 2025, Estonia was ranked 2nd in the world by press freedoms.

Several international and human rights organisations, such as Human Rights Watch, the Organization for Security and Co-operation in Europe in 1993 and the UN Human Rights Council in 2008 have found little major apparent issues or patterns of systematic abuse of human rights or discrimination on ethnic grounds, while others, such as Amnesty International in 2009, have raised concerns regarding immigrants, and regarding the Russophone minority, who "suffer unemployment rates almost twice as high as among ethnic Estonians".

== History ==
Estonians' individual human rights and collective rights to exist as an ethnic entity, have been routinely violated for eight centuries since the Northern Crusades and Baltic German rule, followed by two centuries of Russian imperial suzerainty and ending with half a century of Soviet occupation. Estonia's first constitution of 1920 included safeguards for civil and political rights that were the standard of the day. The 1925 Law on Cultural Autonomy was an innovative piece of legislation that provided for the protection of the collective rights for citizens of non-Estonian ethnicities.

== Estonia in the international human rights system ==
As of end of 2010, European Court of Human Rights has delivered 23 judgments in cases brought against Estonia (beginning from 2001); in 19 cases, it found at least one violation of the European Convention on Human Rights or its protocols. In 2001, Estonia has extended a standing invitation to Special Procedures of UN Human Rights Council.

=== Participation in basic human rights treaties ===
UN core treaties	Participation of Estonia	CoE core treaties	Participation of Estonia
Convention on the Elimination of All Forms of Racial Discrimination	Accession in 1991	European Convention on Human Rights	Ratified in 1996
International Covenant on Civil and Political Rights	Accession in 1991	Protocol 1 (ECHR)	Ratified in 1996
First Optional Protocol (ICCPR)	Accession in 1991	Protocol 4 (ECHR)	Ratified in 1996
Second Optional Protocol (ICCPR)	Accession in 2004	Protocol 6 (ECHR)	Ratified in 1998
International Covenant on Economic, Social and Cultural Rights	Accession in 1991	Protocol 7 (ECHR)	Ratified in 1996
Convention on the Elimination of All Forms of Discrimination Against Women	Accession in 1991	Protocol 12 (ECHR)	Signed in 2000
Optional Protocol (CEDAW)	Not signed	Protocol 13 (ECHR)	Ratified in 2004
United Nations Convention Against Torture	Accession in 1991	European Social Charter	Not signed
Optional Protocol (CAT)	Ratified in 2006	Additional Protocol of 1988 (ESC)	Not signed
Convention on the Rights of the Child	Accession in 1991	Additional Protocol of 1995 (ESC)	Not signed
Optional Protocol on the Involvement of Children in Armed Conflict (CRC)	Signed in 2003	Revised European Social Charter	Ratified in 2000
Optional Protocol on the sale of children, child prostitution and child pornography (CRC-OP-SC)	Ratified in 2004	European Convention for the Prevention of Torture and Inhuman or Degrading Treatment or Punishment	Ratified in 1996
Convention on the Protection of the Rights of All Migrant Workers and Members of Their Families	Not signed	European Charter for Regional or Minority Languages	Not signed
Convention on the Rights of Persons with Disabilities	Signed in 2007	Framework Convention for the Protection of National Minorities	Ratified in 1997
Optional Protocol (CRPD)	Not signed	Convention on Action against Trafficking in Human Beings	Ratified in 2015

=== Latest documents in reporting procedures ===
Experts' body	State report	Experts' body's document
Human Rights Committee	2018	2019
Committee on Economic, Social and Cultural Rights	2017	2019
Committee on the Elimination of Racial Discrimination	2019	2014
Committee Against Torture	2011	2013
Committee on the Rights of the Child	.	2017
Committee on the Elimination of Discrimination Against Women	2015	2016
European Committee on Social Rights	2020	2019-2020
Committee for the Prevention of Torture	not foreseen	2019
FCNM Advisory Committee	2019	2015
European Commission against Racism and Intolerance	not foreseen	2015
UN Committee on the Rights of Persons with Disabilities	2015	2021

== Overviews by human rights organisations ==
=== Amnesty International ===
According to Amnesty International, linguistic minorities face discrimination in a number of areas, especially in employment and education. Migrants were exposed to harassment by state officials and attacks by extremist groups. Criminal investigations into allegations of excessive use of force by police were dismissed. Also Estonian security police, Kaitsepolitsei, made allegations against the Legal Information Centre for Human Rights (LICHR), which it claims is widely seen as an attempt to misrepresent the organization and to undermine its work.

=== Human Rights Watch ===
According to Human Rights Watch report, 1993, the organisation did not find systematic, serious abuses of human rights in the area of citizenship. Non-citizens in Estonia were guaranteed basic rights under the Constitution of Estonia. However, there were some problems concerning the successful integration of some who were permanent residents at the time Estonia regained independence.

=== Freedom House ===
According to Freedom House, Estonia has wide political rights and civil liberties. Political parties are allowed to organize freely and elections have been free and fair. Public access to government information are respected and the country has a freedom of the press, although a 2007 report discussed Estonia's Kaitsepolitsei security organs as the nation's political police. Also religious freedom is respected in law and in practice. Corruption is regarded as a relatively minor problem in Estonia. The judiciary is independent and generally free from government interference. As of 2023, Freedom House lists Estonia as 94 out of 100 in Freedom in the World.

=== United Nations Human Rights Council ===
The 2008 report of Special Rapporteur on racism to United Nations Human Rights Council noted the existence of political will by the Estonian State authorities to fight the expressions of racism and discrimination in Estonia. According to the report, the representatives of the Russian speaking communities in Estonia saw the most important form of discrimination in Estonia is not ethnic, but rather language-based (Para. 56). The rapporteur expressed several recommendations including strengthening the Chancellor of Justice, facilitating granting citizenship to persons of undefined nationality and making language policy subject of a debate to elaborate strategies better reflecting the multilingual character of society (paras. 89-92).

=== UN Committee on the Elimination of Racial Discrimination ===
The UN Committee on the Elimination of Racial Discrimination (CERD) examines regular reports of the member States on how the rights are being implemented under Article 9 of the International Convention on the Elimination of All Forms of Racial Discrimination. In its 2010 concluding observations the Committee noted some positive aspects, and raised concerns and made recommendations with regard to Estonia's compliance with the convention. Concerns named in the report included: lack of protection of minorities from hate speech; racial motivation of crimes not being an aggravating circumstance; strong emphasis on Estonian language in the state Integration strategy; usage of punitive approach for promoting Estonian language; restrictions of the usage of minority language in public services; low level of minority representation in political life; persistently high number of persons with undetermined citizenship, etc.

=== Other institutions ===
According to Cliohres, the European Network of Excellence organized by a group of 45 universities publication the alleged violations of human rights of the Russian-speaking population in Estonia has served as a pretext of trying to lock the region within the sphere of influence of Russia. Moscow's attempts to take political advantage over the issue of the Russophone minority in Estonia have been successful as Kremlin has used every international forum where the claims of the violations of human rights in Estonia have been presented.

The United Nations Development Programme's forum Development and Transition has discussed the situation of Estonia and Latvia in 2005.

James Hughes, a US sociologist from the Trinity College, claimed Latvia and Estonia are both states "captured by the titular ethnic groups", employing a "sophisticated and extensive policy regime of discrimination" against their respective Russophone populations. He names three "pillars" of discrimination: refusal of citizenship, language usage, and participation rights, and claims discrimination is constrained by the "economic dependence on Russophone labour".

Nils Muiznieks, a Latvian politician, former minister for Social Integration, claimed, "Hughes provides simple conclusions about the complex realities of minority policies and inter-ethnic relations in Estonia and Latvia".

Both the Organization for Security and Co-operation in Europe (OSCE) mission in Estonia and the OSCE High Commissioner on National Minorities declared in 1993 that they could not find a pattern of human rights violations or abuses in Estonia.

According to Human Right Report of United States Department of State, Estonia generally respects the human rights of citizens and the large ethnic Russian noncitizen community. No credible reports were found regarding human rights abuses.

According to Russian Ministry of Foreign Affairs, as at 2011, the evaluations given by UN Committee on economic, social and cultural rights show acute human rights issues, in particular in the field of rights of national minorities, to remain unresolved in Estonia.

== Issues ==
=== Surveys related to human rights ===
Surveys conducted between 1993 and 1997 found ethnic Russians living in the Baltic states generally did not see themselves as particularly threatened or suffering from "apartheid" or racism as the Russian government often contended; a British survey in 1993 showed that "solid majorities of ethnic Russians did not consider their situations as "dangerous, difficult or especially burdensome" and found 69% of Russian speakers disagreed with the view that non-citizens and minorities were badly treated, while a Russian survey in 1995 found only 8% of Russian speakers felt their human rights were being violated.

According to a 2008 survey of 500 ethnic Russians conducted by the EU Fundamental Rights Agency, 59% of those questioned characterized ethnic discrimination as very or fairly widespread in the country. 27% claimed they had experienced discrimination based on their ethnic origin in the past 5 years, including 17% during the past 12 months (compared to 4–5% in Lithuania and Latvia.) Discrimination at workplace was characterized as widespread, with 72% of poll participants saying that a different ethnic background would be hindering to advancement. 39% said they had experienced discrimination during the past 5 years when looking for work, including 16% during the past 12 months—the highest rate in all the countries surveyed. 10% confirmed that they avoid certain places, such as shops or cafés because they believed they would receive bad treatment due to their ethnic background.

However another survey result in 2008 found only 3% of ethnic Russians said they had regularly experienced hostility or unfair treatment because of their ethnicity, and 9% occasionally; 1% stated they had been regularly offended on the basis of their ethnicity while 7% occasionally. This survey found that while most of the respondents had not actually experienced any discrimination personally, they nevertheless held the belief that the level of discrimination was high.

The European Centre for Minority Issues has examined Estonia's treatment of its Russophone minority. In its conclusion, the centre stated that all international organisations agree that no forms of systematic discrimination towards the Russian-speaking population can be observed and praises the efforts made thus far in amendments to laws on education, language and the status of non-citizens, there nevertheless remains the issue of the large number of such non-citizens. As of September 2, 2009, 102,466, or 7.5% of Estonia's population remain non-citizens, dropping from 32% in 1992 and 12% in 2003. In November 2005 a survey was conducted among residents with undetermined citizenship. The results show that 61% of those residents wanted Estonian citizenship, 13% Russian citizenship and 6% citizenship of another country. 17% of the respondents were not interested in acquiring any citizenship at all. It was found that the older the respondent, the more likely he or she doesn't want to have any citizenship. The survey also showed that respondents who were born in Estonia were more likely to wish to get Estonian citizenship (73%), than those not born in Estonia (less than 50%).

Recent studies have shown that one of the significant factors of statelessness is the advantage of retaining an ambiguous legal status to everyday life; on one hand it is easier for immigrants without Estonian citizenship to travel back to Russia while on the other hand lack of citizenship poses no problems for living in Estonia; a survey in 2008 found that 72% of ethnic Russian respondents cite the ease of travel to Russia as one of the reasons people do not seek Estonian citizenship and 75% state that the fact of lack of citizenship does not hinder their lives is another reason

Several human rights related researches are conducted every year by Estonian local human rights organizations, for example the Estonian Institute of Human Rights.

==== Employment ====
72% of 500 questioned ethnic Russians believed that different ethnic background is hindering to workplace advancement. Russian government officials and parliamentarians echo these charges in a variety of forums. Such claims have become more frequent during times of political disagreements between Russia and these countries and waned when the disagreements have been resolved.

According to the 2008 survey by TIES, a project coordinated by the University of Amsterdam, 38.9% of Russian and 25.2% of Estonian respondents think that "Russians experience hostility or unfair treatment because of their ethnicity" at work "occasionally", "regularly", or "frequently". 51.4% of Russian and 50.4% of Estonian respondents also think that Russians experience ethnic discrimination looking for work. Same report says 40% of Estonians and 44% of Russians think it is "more difficult" or "much more difficult" for Russians to find a job, compared to Estonians. 10% of Estonians and 15% of Russians, on the other side, believe it is "easier", or "much easier" for Russians to find a job.

A 2005 study by European Network Against Racism found that 17.1% of ethnic non-Estonians claimed that they had experienced limitations to their rights or degrading treatment in the workplace during the last 3 years because of their ethnic origin.

Amnesty had noted in a 2006 report that members of the Russian-speaking minority in Estonia enjoy very limited linguistic and minority rights, and often find themselves de facto excluded from the labour market and educational system. The discriminating policies of Estonia have led to "disproportionately high levels of unemployment among the Russian-speaking linguistic minority. This in turn has further contributed to social exclusion and vulnerability to other human rights abuses. In consequence, many from this group are effectively impeded from the full enjoyment of their economic, social and cultural rights (ESC rights)."

Charles Kroncke and Kenneth Smith in a 1999 article published in the journal Economics of Transition argue that while there was no ethnicity based discrimination in 1989, the situation in 1994 was completely different. According to the article, there is substantial evidence of discrimination against ethnic Russians in the 1994 Estonian labour market. The evidence examined in the article also suggested that Estonian language ability does not significantly affect wages. Kroncke and Smith also point out the surprising fact, that Estonian-born ethnic Russians appear to fare worse than immigrant ethnic Russians. A later study by Kristian Leping and Ott Toomet published in 2008 in the Journal of Comparative Economics reports that a lack of fluency in the Estonian language and segregated social networks and school system, rather than ethnicity, as the prime reason for the apparent wage gap between Estonian and non-Estonian speakers.

==== Education ====
Since restoration of independence in 1991, Estonia has been funding Russian-language elementary, comprehensive and high schools alongside Estonian-language schools, with future reform planned since the late 1990s but repeatedly delayed. The reform plan was commenced in 2007. On October 13th 2022 Riigikogu approved a plan to fully transition to Estonian-language education, which was officially set in motion on December 12th of the same year. The transition to full Estonian-language education began in 2024.

According to schedule, 60% of all subjects of grades 10, 11 and 12 are to be taught in Estonian by 2011 in all state-funded schools. All state-funded schools already teach Estonian literature in Estonian since the 2007/2008 academic year. The government has been reserved authority to grant waivers and extensions to some state-funded schools on a case-by-case basis.

In the 2007/2008 academic year, 49 Russian schools (79%) were teaching Music in Estonian, 30 Russian schools (48%) were teaching Social Studies in Estonian and 17 Russian schools (27%) taught both transition subjects in Estonian.

Amnesty International has recommended that the authorities provide more support for teachers and adequate resources for students who will be required to replace Russian with Estonian as their language of teaching and instruction; replacing Russian with Estonian as their learning language to successfully manage this transition.

According to the 2008 survey by TIES, 50% of ethnic Russian respondents think that the statement, "As a result of [2007 school] reform the quality of education for Russian youth will worsen" is "exactly true" or "moderately true". Report also notes that "a significantly larger share of Estonians complete higher education, while Russians more often only finish secondary education. At the same time, there were no significant differences between Estonians and Russians school success in terms of drop-out rates from basic and secondary school."

==== Ethnicity and crime ====
UN Committee Against Torture in its 2008 report on Estonia notes that "approximately 33 per cent of the prison population is composed of stateless persons, while they represent approximately 8 per cent of the overall population". The Committee calls this representation "disproportionate", and urges Estonia to take additional steps to protect rights of non-citizens and stateless residents. In 2008, about 78% of non-citizens were ethnic Russians; less than 3% ethnic Estonians. As of 2006, approximately 60% of the ethnic Russian population were non-citizens, 40 percent were stateless.

=== Treatment of Roma ===
The Council of Europe stated in 2006 that "the Roma community in Estonia is disproportionately affected by unemployment and discrimination in the field of education." The European Commission had previously conducted close monitoring of Estonia in 2000 and concluded that there was no evidence that these minorities are subject to discrimination.

=== Bronze Night incident ===
A number of organisations have commented on the events surrounding the Bronze Night incident. There was a concern expressed about possible human right violations perpetrated by both demonstrators and police. During the April 2007 riots in Tallinn, some police allegedly used excessive force against demonstrators. Eight criminal cases opened against officers, where charges were dropped in six, and two were pending at year’s end. The International Federation of Human Rights (FIDH)–a coalition of 155 human rights groups– urged the Estonian authorities to investigate all acts of human rights violations during the night. The organisation called upon the Estonian authorities to "put an end to any practice of discrimination against the Russian-speaking minority, which constitutes about 30% of the Estonian population, and to conform in any circumstances with the provisions of the International Convention on the Elimination of all forms of Racial Discrimination." FIDH and LHRC also condemned acts of vandalism perpetrated by demonstrators in Tallinn, as well as the blockade of the Estonian embassy in Moscow.

=== Trafficking in persons ===
According to the CIA World Factbook, "Estonia is a source, transit, and destination country for women subjected to forced prostitution, and for men and women subjected to conditions of forced labor". Estonia also "does not fully comply with the minimum standards for the elimination of trafficking, being the only country of the EU without a specific trafficking law.

=== Exploitation of children ===
Independent Special Rapporteur Najat Maalla M'jid of the United Nations has said that Estonia has taken clear steps to protect children from exploitation, although the human rights expert has commented that "young people remain at risk and continued vigilance from authorities is needed."

=== Sexual orientation ===
Homosexual sex, which was illegal in the Soviet Union, was legalised in Estonia in 1992. The age of consent is 16 years and was equalized for both homosexual and heterosexual sex in 2001. Estonia legalised civil unions for same-sex couples with a law approved by the parliament in 2014. Same-sex marriage has been legal in Estonia since 1 January 2024.

== International rankings ==
- Democracy Index, 2024: 21 out of 167
- Worldwide Press Freedom Index, 2023: 8 out of 173.
- Internet freedom score: 13 (2009), (Note: a score of 1 is most free and 100 least free) 10 (2011),10 (2012), 9 (2013), and 94 (2023) (Note: out of 100)
- Worldwide Privacy Index, 2007: 13 out of 37.
- Worldwide Quality-of-life Index, 2005: 68 out of 111.
- Human Development Index, 2010: 34 out of 169.
- Freedom in the World, 2008: Political rights score: 1 and Civil liberties score: 1 (1 being most free, 7 least free).
- Global Corruption Report, 2007: 24 out of 163.

== See also ==
- Estonian nationality law
- History of Russians in Estonia
- Internet censorship and surveillance in Estonia
