= Latvian Human Rights Committee =

Non-governmental organization

- Founded: 1992
- Purpose: Human rights
- Location: Riga, Latvia
- Key people: Natalia Yolkina (co-chairperson), Vladimir Buzayev (co-chairperson)
- Website: www.lhrc.lv
- Formerly called: Latvian Human Rights and International Humane Cooperation Committee
- Member of FIDH, AEDH

Latvian Human Rights Committee (Latvian: Latvijas Cilvēktiesību komiteja, Russian: Латвийский комитет по правам человека, romanized: Latviyskiy komitet po pravam cheloveka) is a non-governmental human rights organization in Latvia. It is a member of international human rights and anti-racism NGOs FIDH, AEDH. Co-chairpersons of LHRC are Vladimir Buzayev and Natalia Yolkina. According to the authors of the study "Ethnopolitics in Latvia", former CBSS Commissioner on Democratic Institutions and Human Rights Ole Espersen "had visited LHRC various times and had used mostly the data of that organisation in his views on Latvia".

== History ==
In 1992, LHRC was founded (as the Latvian Human Rights and International Humanitarian Co-operation Committee) by a group of people co-operating since 1990, led by Tatjana Ždanoka and Vladimir Bogdanov. In 1995, LHRC joined FIDH and was registered by Latvian authorities.

Since 1994, LHRC periodically publishes an updated list of differences in rights between citizens and non-citizens of Latvia. Since 1997, LHRC supports UNITED for Intercultural Action. In 2007, LHRC has joined ENAR and AEDH.

== Publications ==
The following printed publications in English were issued or prepared by LHRC:

- Human Rights and Minorities in Latvia (1999)
- Report on the Implementation of the Framework Convention for the Protection of National Minorities in the Republic of Latvia (2002)
- Media Legislation, Minority Issues, and Implications for Latvia (2003)
- Citizens of a Non-Existent State (2008; second edition 2011; includes the aforementioned list)
- Poleshchuk, Vadim, ed. (2009). Chance to Survive: Minority Rights in Estonia and Latvia (PDF). Moscow, Paris, Tallinn: Foundation for Historical Outlook. ISBN 978-9949-18-818-5. (prepared in co-operation with Legal Information Centre for Human Rights)
- Buzayev, Vladimir (2013). Legal and social situation of the Russian-speaking minority in Latvia (PDF). Riga: Averti-R. ISBN 978-9934-8245-1-7. Archived from the original (PDF) on 2016-04-11.
- Language policy of Latvia (2020). ISBN 978-9934-23-326-5

== Cases before international judicial bodies ==
LHRC members have worked on the following cases before international human rights institutions:

- Agafonova v. Latvia (UN HRC) – Latvia has issued residence permit for the applicant
- Ignatāne v. Latvia (UN HRC) – views in favour of Ignatane (2001)
- Podkolzina v. Latvia (ECtHR; later, British lawyer W. Bowring has taken the representation) – judgment in favour of Podkolzina (2002)
- Rudova v. Latvia (ECtHR) – decision in favour of government (2002)
- Kuhareca v. Latvia (ECtHR) – decision in favour of government (2004)
- Ždanoka v. Latvia (ECtHR; later, British lawyer W. Bowring has taken the representation) – 5:2 judgment in favour of Ždanoka (2004), 13:4 Grand Chamber final judgment in favour of government (2006)
- Ševanova v. Latvia (ECtHR) – judgment in favour of Ševanova (2006), decision to struck the case out of list, paying costs to Ševanova (2007),
- Mitina v. Latvia (ECtHR) – partial decision (2002) and final decision (2006) in favour of government
- Miholapa v. Latvia (ECtHR; later, British lawyer W. Bowring has taken the representation) – judgment in favour of Miholapa (2007)
- Andrejeva v. Latvia (ECtHR) – Grand Chamber 16:1 judgment in favour of Andrejeva (2009)
- Raihman v. Latvia (UN HRC) – 13:2 views in favour of Raihman (2010)
- Petrova v. Latvia (EctHR) – Chamber judgment in favour of Petrova (2014)
- Petropavlovskis v. Latvia (ECtHR) – Chamber judgment in favour of government (2015)
