= Andrejeva v Latvia =

Legal case

Andrejeva v. Latvia
- Court: European Court of Human Rights
- Decided: 18 February 2009
- Citation: ECLI:CE:ECHR:2009:0218JUD005570700

Case history
- Prior action: CC of Latvia case No. 2001-02-0106
- Subsequent action: CC of Latvia case No. 2010-20-0106

Court membership
- Judges sitting: Jean-Paul Costa; Christos Rozakis; Nicolas Bratza; Peer Lorenzen; Françoise Tulkens; Josep Casadevall; Ireneu Cabral Barreto; Corneliu Bîrsan; Nina Vajić; Alvina Gyulumyan; Dean Spielmann; Davíð Þór Björgvinsson; Ján Šikuta; Ineta Ziemele; Mark Villiger; Isabelle Berro-Lefèvre; Zdravka Kalaydjieva

Case opinions
- Majority: Costa, Rozakis, Bratza, Lorenzen, Tulkens, Casadevall, Cabral Barreto, Bîrsan, Vajić, Gyulumyan, Spielmann, Björgvinsson, Šikuta, Villiger, Berro-Lefèvre, Kalaydjieva Partial dissent: Ziemele

Keywords
- age pension; citizenship; discrimination

Andrejeva v. Latvia (55707/00) was a case decided by the Grand Chamber of the European Court of Human Rights in 2009. It concerned ex parte proceedings and discrimination in calculating retirement pensions for non-citizens of Latvia.

== Facts ==
N. Andrejeva, a non-citizen of Latvia, was employed at a recycling plant at the Olaine chemical complex, formerly a public body under the authority of the USSR Ministry of the Chemical Industry and located in Olaine, Latvia.

According to the Latvian State Pensions Act, only periods of work in Latvia could be taken into account in calculating the pensions of non-citizens of Latvia, unlike citizens of Latvia.

As the applicant had been employed from 1973 to 1990 by entities based in Kiev and Moscow, her pension was calculated solely in respect of the time she had worked before and after that period. Latvian courts agreed with the administration.

Andrejeva was unable to take part in the hearing of 6 October 1999 before the Supreme Court of Latvia as it had started earlier than scheduled.

== Court's proceedings ==
The application was lodged with the Court on 27 February 2000. It was declared partly admissible on 11 July 2006 (meanwhile, the Constitutional Court of Latvia found the provisions in question constitutional, hearing a case after a complaint by MPs of ForHRUL and LSDSP). On 11 December 2007 the Chamber relinquished the case to the Grand Chamber. The Grand Chamber held public hearing on 25 June 2008 and delivered its judgment, which was the third Grand Chamber judgment on the merits in a case against Latvia, after Slivenko and Ždanoka, on 18 February 2009.

The applicant was represented before the court by Vladimirs Buzajevs and A. Dimitrovs, members of the Latvian Human Rights Committee.

== Judgment concerning Article 6 ==
The Court unanimously concluded that the fact Andrejeva was unable to take part in the hearing of 6 October 1999 as it had started earlier than scheduled violated Article 6 of the ECHR.

== Judgment concerning Article 14 and Article 1 of the 1st protocol ==
Concerning the government's objections that "In view of the financial burden borne by Latvia and the limited capacity of its national budget, it was not unreasonable for it to assume full responsibility for the pensions of its own citizens alone" (para. 71) and "the situation complained of was largely the fault of the applicant herself, who had refused to apply for naturalisation despite having been entitled to do so since 1998. The sooner she did so, the sooner she would receive the desired portion of her pension" (para. 72), the Court concluded that Andrejeva already "has the status of a 'permanently resident non-citizen' of Latvia, the only State with which she has any stable legal ties and thus the only State which, objectively, can assume responsibility for her in terms of social security" (para. 88) and that "dismissing the victim's claims on the ground that he or she could have avoided the discrimination by altering one of the factors in question – for example, by acquiring a nationality – would render Article 14 devoid of substance" (para. 91).

The Court accepted that the difference in treatment between non-citizens and citizens pursued at least one legitimate aim that was broadly compatible with the general objectives of the convention, namely the protection of the country's economic system. However, it did not find a "reasonable relationship of proportionality" between the legitimate aim pursued and the means employed. The Court therefore found a violation of Article 14 taken in conjunction with Article 1 of Protocol No. 1, by 16 votes to 1.

=== Partly dissenting opinion ===
Judge Ineta Ziemele did not find violation of Article 14 taken in conjunction with Article 1 of Protocol No. 1 in the case, considering that "saying or implying that Latvia has some automatic obligations stemming from the Soviet period would defy the fact that the occupation and annexation of Latvia were illegal in international law" (para. 22).

== Just satisfaction and implementation of the judgment ==
Andrejeva was awarded 6500 euros: 5000 euros in respect of all damage sustained and 1500 euros in respect of costs and expenses.

In order to implement the judgment, amendments to the State Pensions Act were adopted in the first reading. They foresaw to abolish discrimination by cancelling rights of citizens of Latvia to receive pensions for all time worked in the USSR outside Latvia, so that both citizens and non-citizens would receive pensions for this time only in certain cases. In December 2009, the decision on the amendments was postponed. Those amendments were criticized by the Equal Rights Trust.

On 12 October 2009, Andrejeva submitted an application to the administrative court after authorities refused to recalculate her pension. Andrejeva died in April 2010, while the case on recalculating the pension was still pending.

In February 2011, the Constitutional Court of Latvia, upon a complaint by several other non-citizens, found the provisions in question compatible with the provisions of constitution and ECHR. In August 2011, a new application to the ECHR by the same non-citizens concerning those provisions was registered.

In February 2012, the European Commission against Racism and Intolerance published its report on Latvia, noting that "the Constitutional Court's decision, at best, gives a very narrow interpretation of the ECHR's judgment" and that the approach taken by authorities "fails to address the 'non-citizens', who have worked in the remaining 9 former USSR republics, in respect of which a bilateral agreement has not been signed. This, according to the ECHR's Andrejeva judgment, amounts to discrimination".

In 2012, the Latvian Human Rights Committee submitted a communication to the Committee of Ministers of the Council of Europe on the lack of implementation of the judgment, which was responded to by the agent of the Latvian government.

In 2013, the Advisory Committee on the Framework Convention for the Protection of National Minorities adopted its second opinion on Latvia, stating "Regarding access to pensions, the Advisory Committee regrets that the 2009 Andrejeva Judgment of the European Court on Human Rights has not led to a comprehensive solution regarding the calculation of pensions of citizens and 'non-citizens'. It notes the Government's view that the judgment has been implemented by signing bilateral agreements with the Russian Federation and a number of other countries in which 'non-citizens' spent periods of employment under the Soviet Union, but remains concerned by the fact that these agreements do not cover all former republics of the Soviet Union and are therefore not suitable to address the situation vis-à-vis all 'non-citizens'. It notes with interest reports of a new case relating to the calculation of pension benefits having been registered at the European Court of Human Rights following the rejection of the Constitutional Court in February 2011 of the complaints of five 'non-citizens' relating to relevant sections of the State Pension Act".
