= Portillo Cáceres v Paraguay =

2019 UN Human Rights Committee court case

- Court: United Nations Human Rights Committee under the 1^{st} ICCR Optional Protocol
- Full case name: Portillo Cáceres y Otros v. Paraguay
- Decided: 9 August 2019
- Session: 126
- Citation(s): CCPR/C/126/D/2751/2016 (Communication №2751/2016)

Committee membership
- Yadh Ben Achour, Ilze Brands Kehris, Arif Bulkan, Ahmed Amin Fathalla, Shuichi Furuya, Christof Heyns, Bamariam Koita, Duncan Laki Muhumuza, Photini Pazartzis, Hernán Quezada, Vasilka Sancin, José Manuel Santos Pais, Yuval Shany, Hélène Tigroudja, Andreas Zimmermann, Gentian Zyberi
- Opinion in: English, French, and Spanish
- Decided in: Geneva, Switzerland

Laws applied
- International Covenant on Civil and Political Rights; First Optional Protocol to the International Covenant on Civil and Political Rights § 5 ¶¶ 2(b) et seq.

Area of law

Portillo Cáceres v Paraguay (Note: The full case name is Portillo Cáceres y Otros v. Paraguay.) (Communication No.2751/2016) was a case decided by the United Nations Human Rights Committee in 2019.

The case was initiated by a group of farmers in Paraguay who lived next to soybean plantations that had been using illegal agrochemicals. Contamination from negligent practices had resulted negative health effects, including the death of one farmer, Rubén Portillo Cáceres, and the poisoning of 22 others as well as negative impacts on the livelihoods of families living in the area. Despite an investigation by local and state officials finding evidence of wrongdoing, the state did not put environmental protection measures into effect and large amounts of chemicals continued to be released near the victims' homes.

In a resolution on 9 August 2019, the committee ruled in favor of the farmers, finding that their rights to life, privacy, family life, and residence were violated, and that Paraguay did not adequately demand compliance with environmental regulations or repair the damage caused.

Portillo Cáceres v Paraguay is a landmark court case in international toxics regulation. It marked the first instance of the United Nations Human Rights Committee recognizing that a state can violate its obligations under the International Covenant on Civil and Political Rights by failing to take action in cases of environmental harm. Paraguay was the first country in the world to be condemned by the Human Rights Committee for the death of a person from pesticide poisoning.

== Background ==
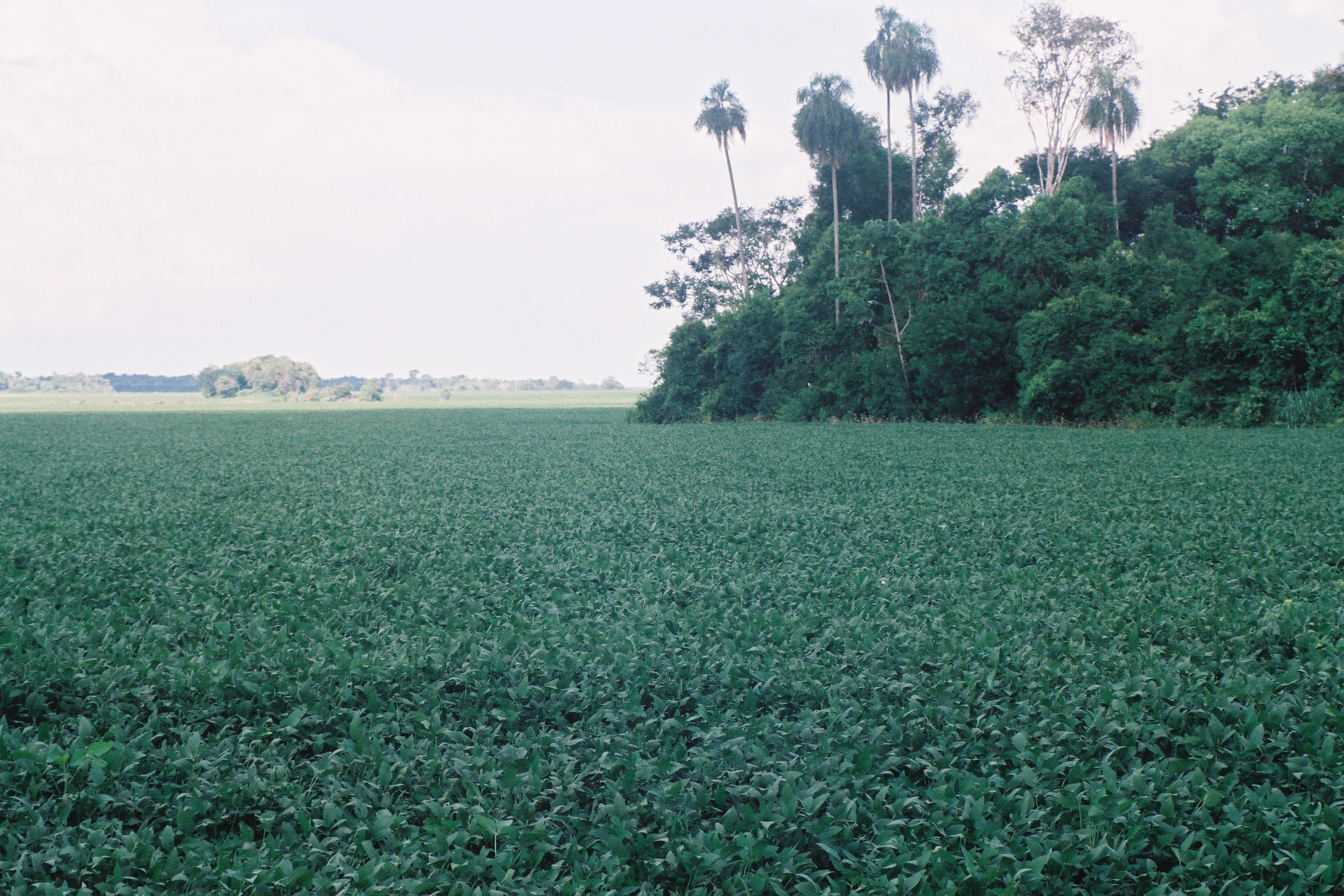
A soybean field in Paraguay

94% of arable land in Paraguay is dedicated to the agricultural production of commodities such as soybeans, corn and cotton. Paraguay is the world's seventh-largest producer of transgenic soybeans, a crop frequently fumigated with pesticides such as bifenthrin, chlorpyrifos, paraquat and atrazine. Between 2011 and 2013, the import of pesticides to Paraguay nearly quadrupled, from 8.8 to 32.4 million liters.

Yerutí is a campesino colony founded by Paraguay in 1991 on land that an education minister of dictator Alfredo Stroessner surrendered in compensation for the embezzlement of public funds. While the 2,212-hectare (5,470-acre) colony has 223 lots, by 2019 there were only 34 registered properties, with industrial soybean fields occupying the untitled public land. Despite Agrarian Reforms meant to prevent the practice, much of the land is sold or leased to soybean plantations run by Brazilians and Brasiguayos. The widespread use of agrochemicals in Yerutí has impacted living conditions, domestic economies and the health of residents. Contamination of aquifers and water sources rendered the Yerutí and Kuairû streams unusable for fishing. Residents also experienced the deterioration of their crops, losing fruit trees, as well as the death of their livestock.

== Pesticide poisoning incident ==
Location of Canindeyú Department within Paraguay

Rubén Portillo Cáceres, a farmer from the village of Colonia Yerutí in Canindeyú Department of eastern Paraguay, lived with his family on property adjacent to the transgenic soybean fields of Condor Agricola and Hermanos Galhera. During the soybean fumigation season at the beginning of 2011, the 26-year-old farmer fell ill, experiencing headaches, vomiting, and diarrhea. Three days later, on 6 January 2011, he died while on his way to the hospital in Curuguaty. His death was determined to be the result of toxic levels of pesticides in his system. Another 22 other residents of the village also became ill, including Portillo Cáceres's two-year-old son, all of whom were admitted to the hospital.

== Investigation ==
Following Rubén's death and the mass poisoning incident, Curuguaty Hospital director Angie Duarte collected blood and urine samples from the victims and contacted the Prosecutor's Office, the National Service for Plant and Seed Quality and Health, and the Ministry of Environment. The Prosecutor's Office office began an investigation and government inspectors arrived on 13 January. They documented several violations of environmental laws, finding that the expansive soybean farming operations that bordered the family farm were not separated by required buffer zones. Soybeans had also been planted up to the edge of community walkways and there were no protective strips of vegetation to shield residents from pesticides. Inspectors conducted tests for chemicals and found evidence of restricted or banned agricultural insecticides in the Portillo Cáceres family's well water, including aldrin, lindane, and endosulfan. The concentration of lindane, a chemical related to the appearance of non-Hodgkin lymphoma, was three times the limit established for humans by the World Health Organization.

The two agribusinesses involved in the cultivation of soybeans around Yerutí, Condor SA/KLM SA (Condor Agricola) and Hermanos Galhera Agrovalle del Sol S.A/Emmerson Shinin (Hermanos Galhera), were owned by Brazilians and found to have engaged in negligent practices. Hermanos Galhera supplies soybeans to the multinational agribusinesses ADM, Cargill and Bunge Limited. The investigation determined that freshwater sources had been contaminated by chemical residues, finding chemical containers on the ground and citing poor management practices. The corporations did not possess environmental permits for their operations and were washing their spraying equipment in local streams. According to one of the inspectors, neither of the corporations met "the most basic standards of environmental control". The two firms were fined, but denied responsibility and their cases were later dropped following an appeal.

== Legal history ==
=== District of Curuguaty ===
On 14 January 2011, the family of Portillo Cáceres and other farming families impacted by the poisoning filed an amparo, which is a legal action aimed at protecting constitutional rights. While prosecutor Miguel Ángel Rojas repeatedly requested an autopsy for Portillo Cáceres and the medical records of the victims, he did not receive them. Evidence that the well water contained agrochemicals was also excluded from the investigation. While seven Brazilian citizens were accused in the case, none of them were the managers or owners of the Condor Agricola or Hermanos Galhera farms. The District of Curuguaty court ruled on 15 April 2011 that both the National Plant and Seed Quality and Health Service as well as the Ministry of the Environment had failed in their duties and enabled the cause of serious physical harm to the complainants.

Despite the court's decision, the soybean agribusinesses continued using large amounts of pesticides without environmental protection measures or permits. Claims by the family of Portillo Cáceres were ignored by the State of Paraguay for three years. Rubén's sister Norma, along with the other victims of agrochemical poisoning, then submitted a petition to the Human Rights Committee of the United Nations.

=== United Nations Human Rights Committee ===
The Human Rights Committee addressed the case's admissibility before considering its merits. Paraguay argued that domestic remedies had not been exhausted by the complainants and that HRC did not possess ratione materiae jurisdiction as the right to a healthy environment is not recognized by the International Covenant on Civil and Political Rights. The HRC found the complaint admissible, citing the lack of progress in the case over eight years and noting that the claim pertained to the rights to life, the rights to private and family life, and the right to home.

The Human Rights Committee issued a resolution on 9 August 2019. The committee concluded that the response by the government of Paraguay to illegal fumigation was inadequate and had violated the human rights of the victims. The resolution found that the government had specifically violated the right to life, the right to family life, and the right to remedy from harm. The resolution found that no progress had been made in the eight years since the events were initially reported and emphasised that Paraguay did not conduct an autopsy for Ruben despite requests to do so on four separate occasions. The resolution also noted that the Paraguayan government had not published the results of urine and blood tests that were conducted on those who had been poisoned.

The resolution condemned the Paraguayan government for its failure to sanction the corporations involved and ordered the state to conduct an investigation into agrochemical fumigation and to levy administrative and criminal penalties against those responsible. Specifically, the committee recognized that the failure of a state to take action "against environmental harm can violate its obligations to protect the rights to life and to private and family life under Articles 6 and 17 of the International Covenant on Civil and Political Rights". Paraguay was the first country in the world to be condemned by the United Nations Human Rights Committee for the death of a person from pesticide poisoning. The resolution marked the first time that the United Nations Human Rights Committee recognized a connection between environmental protection and the right to life. The decision relied on General Comment No. 36 on the Right to Life, which includes language defining the relationship between the environment and human rights.

== Aftermath ==
While Paraguay was sanctioned by the United Nations in the case, it was ultimately a formality. As of 2022, there has been no penalty issued for Rubén's death and industrial soybean farming continues to operate up to the border of the family farm. Both Condor Agricola and Hermanos Galhera continue agricultural operations in the Yerutí area.

Another opinion of the Human Rights Committee in 2021, in the case Benito Oliveira Pereira et al. v. Paraguay , found that extensive pesticide use by agricultural companies had violated the rights of the Campo Agua'ẽ indigenous community of the Ava Guaraní people to their lands and residence. The Pereira case was emblematic because the notion of "domicile" was applied to an indigenous community in regard to its relationship with its land and territory.

== See also ==
- Teitiota v Chief Executive Ministry of Business, Innovation and Employment
- United Nations Declaration on the Rights of Peasants
