= Optional Protocol to the Convention on the Rights of the Child on a Communications Procedure =

2011 United Nations treaty

- states parties states that have signed, but not ratified states that have not signed
- Drafted: 19 December 2011
- Location: New York
- Effective: 14 April 2014
- Condition: 10 ratifications
- Signatories: 53
- Parties: 52
- Depositary: UN Secretary-General
- Languages: Arabic, Chinese, English, French, Russian and Spanish

The Optional Protocol to the Convention on the Rights of the Child on a Communications Procedure is a treaty open to states that are party to the Convention on the Rights of the Child. The Protocol was adopted by the United Nations' General Assembly on 19 December 2011 and entered into force on 14 April 2014, following ratification by 10 states.

As of November 2026, the Protocol has been signed by 54 states and ratified or acceded by 54 states.

== See also ==
- First Optional Protocol to the International Covenant on Civil and Political Rights
- Optional Protocol to the Convention on the Elimination of All Forms of Discrimination against Women
- Optional Protocol to the Convention on the Rights of Persons with Disabilities
