= Andrejs Mamikins =

Latvian politician and journalist

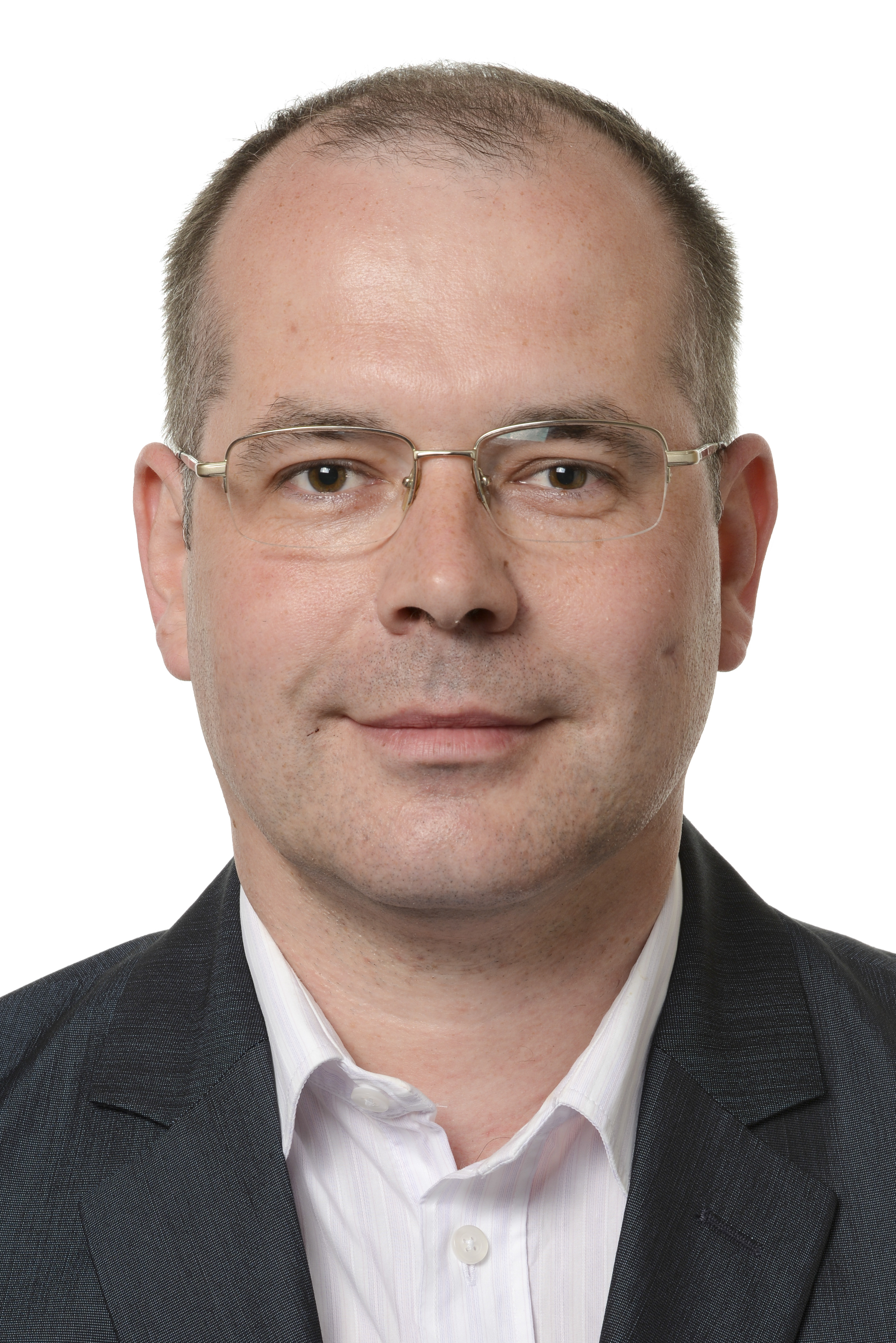

Member of the European Parliament for Latvia
- In office 1 July 2014 – 2019

Personal details
- Born: 11 March 1976 (age 50) Leningrad, Soviet Union
- Party: Harmony (2014-2018)
- Spouse: Natalija Mamikina
- Education: University of Latvia
- Profession: Journalist

Andrejs Mamikins (Russian: Андрей Владимирович Мамыкин, Andrey Vladimirovich Mamykin; born 11 March 1976) is a Latvian Russian former politician, former journalist, former Member of the European Parliament and pundit. Has been on the international wanted list since 2024.

== Early life and career ==
Mamikins was born in Leningrad then in the Russian SFSR, and moved to Riga, Latvian SSR with his parents shortly after birth.

Before his election, Mamikins was a journalist working for several Latvian Russian-language newspapers, radio stations and television channels. He presented programs on Viasat's TV5 Latvia and on REN TV Baltic Channel. He studied Russian language and literature and is a graduate of the Faculty of Humanities at the University of Latvia. In 2010, he completed a master's degree in philology from the same institution.

In September 2023, he fled to Moscow claiming to escape Latvia's "Nazi regime". Since the full-scale Russian invasion of Ukraine, Mamikins has expressed pro-Russian views on social media and several Russian television channels, voicing support for the "Special military operation", trying to refute the Bucha massacre and criticizing the removal of Soviet monuments in Latvia. In June 2024, the Department of International Cooperation of the Prosecutor General's Office of Latvia issued a European Arrest Warrant against Mamikins.

== Political career ==
=== Member of the European Parliament (2014–2019) ===
Mamikins was elected to the European Parliament at the 2014 European Parliament election for the Harmony party. Although he was placed 4th on the Harmony list, Mamikins was preferenced first on the list by Latvian voters and took the party's single seat in the Parliament. He sits with the Progressive Alliance of Socialists and Democrats group.

In mid-2014 Mamikins filed his declaration of financial interests in the European Parliament in Russian, which was promptly refused because Russian is not an official language of the European Union. Mamikins publicized the incident on social media, making waves in Latvian Russian community.

Mamikins worked on the delegation for relations with Belarus, as well as a substitute member on the delegation for relations with EU-Kazakhstan, EU-Kyrgyzstan and EU-Uzbekistan Parliamentary Cooperation Committees, and for relations with Tajikistan, Turkmenistan and Mongolia.

He has since been a member of the Committee on Foreign Affairs. In this capacity, he served as the parliament's rapporteur on the Association Agreement between the EU and Georgia.

In November 2016, the Baltic Centre for Investigative Journalism Re:Baltica reported that Mamikins and another Latvian MEP Iveta Grigule were circumventing the 2014 ban of hiring close relatives as assistants, with Mamikins employing Grigule's daughter Anete and Grigule employing Mamikins' wife Natalija. All four of them declined to comment.

In December 2016, Mamikins met with President of Syria Bashar al-Assad and parliamentary speaker Hadiey Abbas and visited the Khmeimim Air Base along with five other MEPs and representatives of Russian Federation's Federal Council of the Federal Assembly. The visit was condemned by Minister of Foreign Affairs of Latvia Edgars Rinkēvičs and Security Police head Normunds Mežviets.

In December 2017, according to the ranking website MEPRanking.eu, Mamikins was ranked as the 4th most effective Latvian MEP (out of 8) and 365th most effective member of the European Parliament (out of 751).

In 2018, he left the Harmony party after disagreements with Nils Ušakovs over hiring Ušakovs' ex-wife Jeļena Ušakova as an employee in Mamikins' office in Brussels. Mamikins was selected as Latvian Russian Union's No. 1 pick for the Riga constituency and nominated as a candidate for Prime Minister in the 2018 national election without joining the party. Mamikins said to have been motivated to run in the election by the upcoming education reform and did not rule out a partnership with his former party.

In 2020, Mamikins, alongside his party members Tatjana Ždanoka and Miroslavs Mitrofanovs, was included in the European Platform for Democratic Elections database of "biased observers" for backing disputed and rigged elections in Russia and Russian-occupied Ukraine.
