= Tigroudja =

Tigroudja is a surname. Notable people with the surname include:

- Chafik Tigroudja (born 1992), French professional footballer
- Hélène Tigroudja (born 1975), French jurist and international law expert
