= Laurence Helfer =

American lawyer (born 1965)

Member of United Nations Human Rights Committee representing the United States
- In office 1 January 2023 – 31 December 2026

Laurence R. Helfer (born 1965) is an American lawyer.

Helfer graduated from Yale University before pursuing legal studies at the New York University School of Law. He also completed a master's in public administration from Princeton University. Helfer clerked for Dolores Sloviter and practiced law at Rabinowitz, Boudin, Standard, Krinksy & Lieberman, a firm in New York. He has taught at the University of Toronto Faculty of Law, the University of Chicago Law School, Harvard Law School, Loyola Law School, Princeton University, and Vanderbilt University Law School. From 2009, Helfer has taught at Duke University School of Law as Harry R. Chadwick Sr. Distinguished Professor of Law.

In 2022, Helfer was elected to serve on the UN Human Rights Committee as the representative for the United States until 2026.

== Selected books ==
- Helfer, Laurence R.; Austin, Graeme W. (2011). Human Rights and Intellectual Property: Mapping the Global Interface. Cambridge University Press. ISBN 9780521884372.
- Helfer, Laurence R. (2013). Intellectual Property and Human Rights – Critical Concepts in Intellectual Property Law. Vol. 7. Edward Elgar. ISBN 9781781953846.
- Alter, Karen J.; Helfer, Laurence R. (2017). Transplanting International Courts: The Law and Politics of the Andean Tribunal of Justice. Oxford University Press. ISBN 9780199680788.
