= Karen Alter =

Professor of Political Science and Law

- Born: October 23, 1965 (age 60); Chicago, Illinois, U.S.

Education
- Education: Cornell University (BA); MIT (PhD)

Philosophical work
- Institutions: Northwestern University
- Notable works: Establishing the Supremacy of European Law (2001), The European Court's Political Power (2010), The New Terrain of International Law: Courts, Politics, Rights (2014), The Oxford Handbook on International Adjudication (2014); Transplanting International Courts: Law and Politics of the Andean Tribunal of Justice (2017), International Court Authority (with Laurence Helfer and Mikael Rask Madsen) (2018)
- Website: www.KarenJAlter.com

Karen J. Alter is an American academic, well known for her interdisciplinary work on international law's influence in international and domestic politics. Alter is a figure in comparative international courts and the politics of international regime complexity. Her early work focused on the European Court of Justice, a topic on which she published two books and many articles. Karen Alter is a Guggenheim Fellow, and the winner of a Berlin Prize from the American Academy in Berlin. Alter has a courtesy appointment at Northwestern Law School. Fluent in French, Italian and German, Alter has conducted research throughout Europe, Africa and Latin America.

Alter is well known for integrating the study of international relations and law. Although she never pursued a JD, Alter spent a year as an Emile Noel Fellow at Harvard Law School, and she has been a visiting scholar at Northwestern Law School and the American Bar Foundation. Alter is a permanent visiting professor at the University of Copenhagen Faculty of Law, where she participates in the iCourts Center of Excellence, and she is a frequent co-author with Laurence Helfer. Alter is also a member of the Council on Foreign Relations, and serves on the editorial board of the American Journal of International Law, International Studies Review and the Journal of International Dispute Settlement.

== Early life ==
Karen Alter grew up in Los Angeles, where she attended Pacific Palisades High School (Class of 1983). She attended Cornell University, where she graduated magna cum laude, with distinction in all subjects, and worked with Peter J. Katzenstein. Alter received her doctorate in political science at MIT (1996), where she worked with Suzanne Berger and Anne-Marie Slaughter.

== Career ==
Karen Alter began her career at Smith College (1996–2000), after which she moved to Northwestern University. She teaches courses at the graduate and undergraduate level, and on occasion at Northwestern Law School. Alter has been a visiting faculty member at University of Copenhagen Faculty of Law, American Academy, Northwestern Law School, Institute d'Etudes Politiques (Sciences Po), American Bar Foundation, Universität Bremen, Germany, Seikei University, Harvard Law School, and the European Union Center, Harvard University.

Alter is also a frequent commentator on international relations. Her commentary has appeared in the Boston Globe, CNN, U.S. News & World Report, the Chicago Tribune, and the Huffington Post.

== Honors ==
- 2015: Certificate of Merit for a Preeminent Contribution to Creative Scholarship, American Society of International Law

== Selected bibliography ==
=== Books ===
- International Court Authority (with Laurence Helfer and Mikael Rask Madsen Eds) (Oxford University Press, 2018)
- Transplanting International Courts: Law and Politics of the Andean Tribunal of Justice (with Laurence Helfer) (Oxford University Press, 2017)
- The New Terrain of International Law: Courts, Politics, Rights (Princeton University Press, 2014)
- The Oxford Handbook on International Adjudication (with Cesare Romano and Yuval Shany) (Oxford University Press, 2014)
- The European Court's Political Power (Oxford University Press, 2010)
- Establishing the Supremacy of European Law: The Making of an International Rule of Law in Europe (Oxford University Press, 2001)

=== Articles ===
- "The Empire of International Law?" American Journal of International Law, 113 (1)2019: 183-199.
- The Future of International Law, In Diana Ayton-Shenker (ed.), The New Global Agenda, Lahnham: Rowman & Littlefield (2018). Chapter 2 (25-42).
- "The Rise of International Regime Complexity" with Kal Raustiala. Annual Review of Law and Social Science 14:18.1–18.21 2018.
- "Backlash against International Courts in West, East and Southern Africa" European Journal of International Law 27 (2): 293–328. 2016. With Laurence Helfer and James Gathii.
- "A New International Human Rights Court for West Africa: The Court of Justice for the Economic Community of West African States." With Laurence Helfer and Jacqueline McAllister. 107 American Journal of International Law. 107 (4) 737-779 (2014)
- "The Global Spread of European Style International Courts." West European Politics 35 (1): 135-154. 2012.
- "The Multiple Roles of International Courts and Tribunals: Enforcement, Dispute Settlement, Constitutional and Administrative Review" in Jeffrey L. Dunoff and Mark A. Pollack, eds. International Law and International Relations: Synthesizing Insights from Interdisciplinary Scholarship. Cambridge: Cambridge University Press, 2012: 345-370.
- "The Evolving Transnational Legal Order." Annual Review of Law and Social Science. 7: 387-415. 2011.
- "Nature or Nurture: Judicial Lawmaking in the European Court of Justice and the Andean Tribunal of Justice." With Laurence Helfer. International Organization 64 (4) 563-92. 2010.
- "The European Court's Political Power Across Time and Space" (translated into Romanian) 5 Revista Romana de Drept European. 2010.
- "Islands of Effective International Adjudication: Constructing an Intellectual Property Rule of Law in the Andean Community." With Laurence Helfer and Maria Florencia Guerzovich. American Journal of International Law 103 (1) 2009: 1-43
- "The Politics of International Regime Complexity." With Sophie Meunier Perspective on Politics 7 (1) 13-24. 2009.
- "Who are the Masters of the Treaty?: European Governments and the European Court of Justice." International Organization. 52 (1): 125-152.
