= Raihman v. Latvia =

2010 UN Human Rights Committee case

Raihman v. Latvia (Communication No. 1621/2007) was a case decided by the United Nations Human Rights Committee in 2010 (UN Document CCPR/C/100/D/1621/2007).

== Facts and proceedings ==
Mr. Raihman, a Latvian national and member of Jewish and Russian-speaking minorities, was born in 1959. His name and surname were registered as "Леонид Райхман" by USSR authorities, and used until 1998, when he received a Latvian non-citizen's passport with the name and surname amended to "Leonīds Raihmans", with the ending -s required for most masculine names in Latvian.

In 2004, he applied to the State Language Centre to have his name and surname spelled as Leonid Raihman. The applications was rejected, as were the appeals before Latvian courts.

In 2007, Raihman has filed a complaint before HRC, being represented by Latvian Human Rights Committee co-chairman A. Dimitrovs.

== HRC views ==
The Committee found that

the interference entailed for the author presents major inconveniences, which are not reasonable, given the fact that they are not proportionate to the objective sought. While the question of legislative policy, and the modalities to protect and promote official languages is best left to the appreciation of the State parties [..] the forceful addition of a declinable ending to a surname, which has been used in its original form for decades, and which modifies its phonic pronunciation, is an intrusive measure, which is not proportionate to the aim of protecting the official State language. Relying on the previous jurisprudence, where it held that the protection offered by article 17 encompassed the right to choose and change one's own name, the Committee considers that this protection a fortiori protects persons from being passively imposed a change of name by the State party. The Committee therefore considers that the State party's unilateral modification of the author's name on official documents is not reasonable, and thus amounted to arbitrary interference with his privacy, in violation of article 17 of the Covenant

— Human Rights Committee, Doc. CCPR/C/100/D/1621/2007 (para. 8.3.)

Therefore, the Committee did not consider it necessary, to evaluate the case under articles 26 (non-discrimination), 27 (minority rights) and 2 in conjunction with 17, to which Raihman had referred (para. 8.4.).

Two members of the HRC, Krister Thelin and Rafael Rivas Posada, submitted a dissent, seeing no violation of ICCPR in the case.

== Aftermath ==
Mr. Raihman had applied for the court to review his case due to HRC views. The Supreme Court of Latvia decided that the views are a ground to review the case in the executive, in the specific case — in the State Language Centre. Mr. Raihman has gone through court proceedings again; in 2017, the Supreme Court refused to record his name in documents without Latvian endings.

In 2012, the government of Latvia has responded to the Committee that is "sees no need for an immediate action to amend the existing national regulation of writing personal names in official documents. At the same time, the Government will take into account the opinion of the Committee in the possible further discussions on that issue on national level".

The views in Raihman v. Latvia case have been referenced by the UN Human Rights Committee in a later case of Bulgakov v. Ukraine.
