= Ignatāne v. Latvia =

2001 United Nations Human Rights Committee case

Ignatāne v. Latvia (Communication No. 884/1999) was a case decided by the United Nations Human Rights Committee in 2001.

== Facts and proceedings ==
Mrs. Ignatāne stood for Latvian local elections to be held in March 1997, as a candidate of Movement of Social Justice and Equal Rights party. Since 1993, she had a valid language aptitude certificate issued by five experts and stating that she had level 3 proficiency (the highest level) in Latvian.

On 5 February 1997, a Latvian-language examination of Ignatāne was carried out by one inspector. On 11 February, she was struck off the list by decision of the Riga Election Commission, on the basis of an opinion issued by the State Language Board (SLB) to the effect that she did not have the required proficiency in the official language. Ignatāne's appeal was refused by Latvian courts. She filed a complaint before HRC, represented by Tatjana Ždanoka.

== HRC views ==
The Committee noted that, "in this case, the decision of a single inspector, taken a few days before the elections and contradicting a language aptitude certificate issued some years earlier, for an unlimited period, by a board of Latvian language specialists, was enough for the Election Commission to decide to strike the author off the list of candidates for the municipal elections. ... the State party does not contest the validity of the certificate as it relates to the author's professional position, but argues on the basis of the results of the inspector's review in the matter of the author's eligibility. ... the State party has not contested counsel's argument that Latvian law does not provide for separate levels of proficiency in the official language in order to stand for election, but applies the standards and certification used in other instances. ... the first examination, in 1993, was conducted in accordance with formal requirements and was assessed by five experts, whereas the 1997 review was conducted in an ad hoc manner and assessed by a single individual" (para. 7.4.).

Therefore, the Committee concluded that "the annulment of the author's candidacy pursuant to a review that was not based on objective criteria and which the State party has not demonstrated to be procedurally correct" violated article 25 (right to participate in public life) of ICCPR, in conjunction with article 2.

== Aftermath ==
In November 2001, the government amended procedural regulations so that language inspectors would only be entitled "to inspect the authenticity of the state language proficiency certificate", not whether candidate's skills to that in certificate. In 2002, the language requirements for candidates were abolished (see Podkolzina v. Latvia), but reintroduced (for elected councillors) in 2010.

The case was later cited by the Venice Commission and in legal literature including Alfred de Zayas.
