= Vladimir Buzayev =

Latvian politician, human rights activist

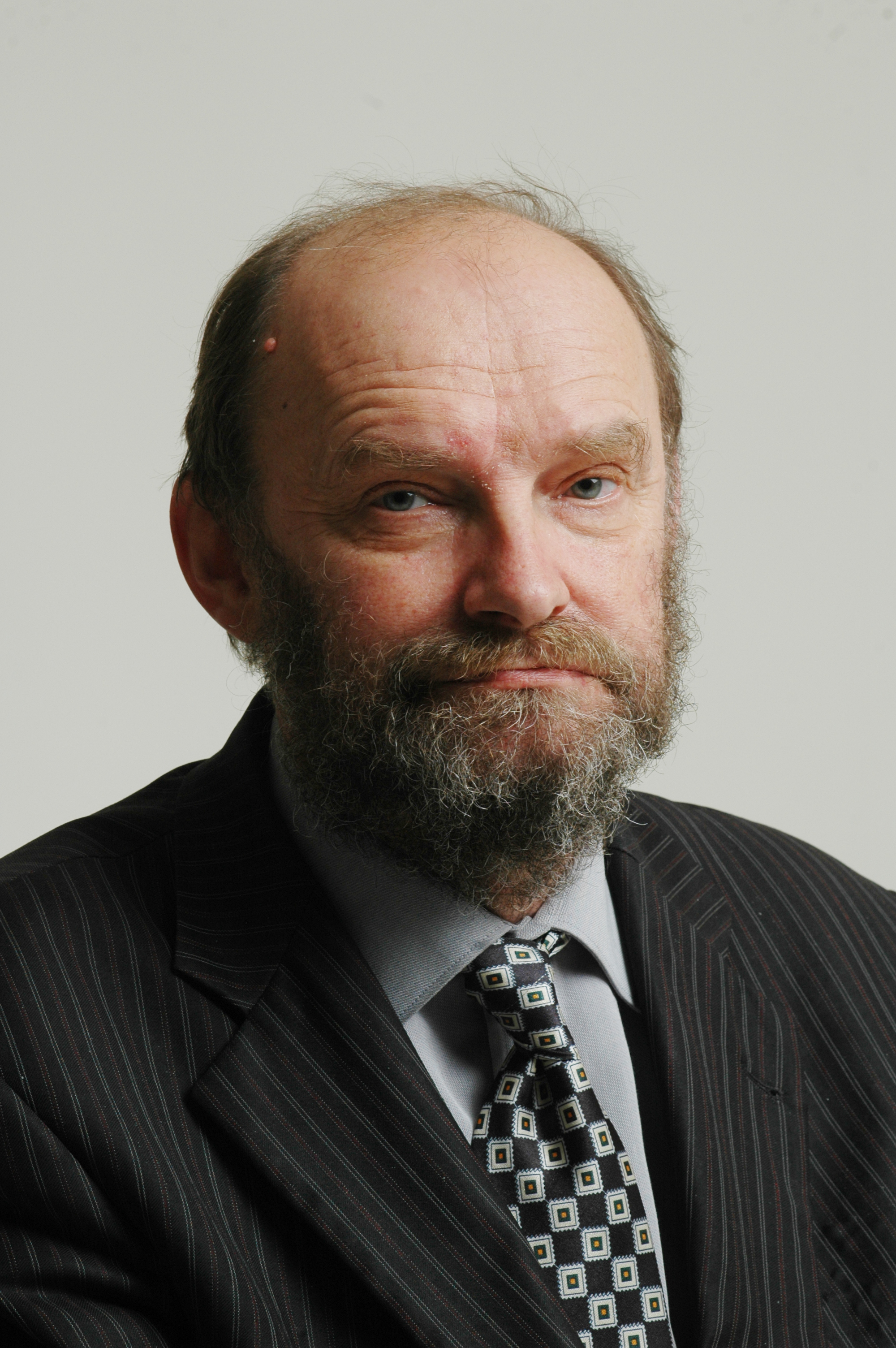
- Vladimir Viktorovich Buzayev
- Born: 8 October 1951 (age 74); Zhukovka, Bryansk Oblast, Russian SFSR
- Education: Latvian State University
- Occupation: Latvian politician
- Office: member of Parliament of Latvia
- Term: 2002-2010
- Political party: Democratic Initiative Centre; Equal Rights/ForHRUL/LRU
- Board member of: Latvian Human Rights Committee

Vladimir Viktorovich Buzayev (Russian: Владимир Викторович Бузаев, Latvian: Vladimirs Buzajevs; born 8 October 1951 in Zhukovka, Bryansk Oblast, Russian SFSR) is a Latvian Russian politician and Member of the 8th and 9th Saeima from For Human Rights in United Latvia (ForHRUL). He has been a member of the Latvian Human Rights Committee since 1993 and its co-chairman since 2012.

== Biography ==
In 1982 he defended a Candidate thesis in hydrogeology.

He was elected to the Riga Council of People's Deputies in 1989, serving until 1994.

Between 1994 and 2001 he was the co-chairman of the Latvian Human Rights Committee.

In 1993 he participated in the foundation of the Equal Rights party. In 2001 he was elected to Riga City Council and became chairman of Equal Rights, a position he held until 2007.

In 2002 he was elected to the 8th Saeima (Parliament). In 2006 he was elected for a second four-year term.

In 2007 he was elected chairman of the Board of ForHRUL (until 2009).

In 2013 he published a book entitled, The Legal and social situation of the Russian-speaking minority in Latvia. In 2017 he published Citizens and 'non-citizens': the politically legalistic division of Post-Soviet Latvia's population.

In 2020 he was again elected to the Riga City Council.

== Personal life ==
Buzayev became a naturalized citizen of Latvia in 2000.
