= Ādamsons v. Latvia =

Court case

Decided 24 June 2008
- Full case name: Ādamsons v. Latvia
- Case: 3669/03
- ECLI: ECLI:CE:ECHR:2008:0624JUD000366903
- Chamber: Third Section

Court composition
- President; Josep Casadevall
- Judges: Elisabet Fura-Sandström; Boštjan M. Zupančič; Lech Garlicki; Alvina Gyulumyan; Egbert Myjer; Corneliu Bîrsan

Ādamsons v. Latvia (3669/03) was a case argued before the European Court of Human Rights and decided in 2008.

== Facts ==
Mr. Jānis Ādamsons was a Soviet Border Guard. Border Guards were part of KGB.

In 1995, the law on legislative elections was adopted in Latvia, forbidding former KGB employees to stand for elections.

Therefore, Mr. Ādamsons, who was Latvian Minister of Interior in 1994–1995, was prevented from standing for elections.

== Judgment ==
The Court noted that Parliamentary Elections Act targeted former “officers” of the KGB. Having regard to the wide-ranging functions of KGB, the Court considered that that concept was too broad and that a restriction of the electoral rights of a KGB officer should take a case-by-case approach to take into account their actual conduct. The Court noted that the applicant had never been accused of having been involved in the misdeeds of the Soviet regime, such as repression of opposition. Therefore, the Court has found a violation of the Article 3 of the 1st protocol of ECHR, by six votes against one. Judges Garlicki, Zupančič and Gyulumyan have filed a concurring opinion. Judge Fura-Sandström has filed a dissenting opinion.

Latvian government has appealed against the judgment, but the appeal was rejected.
