= Estonian Internal Security Service =

Government agency of Estonia

Internal Security Service Kaitsepolitsei

Agency overview
- Formed: 1920

Jurisdictional structure
- Operations jurisdiction: Estonia
- Governing body: Government of Estonia

Operational structure
- Headquarters: Toompuiestee 3, Tallinn
- 59°25′52.1″N 24°44′16.56″E
- Agency executive: Margo Palloson, Director General
- Parent agency: Ministry of the Interior

Website
- kapo.ee/en/

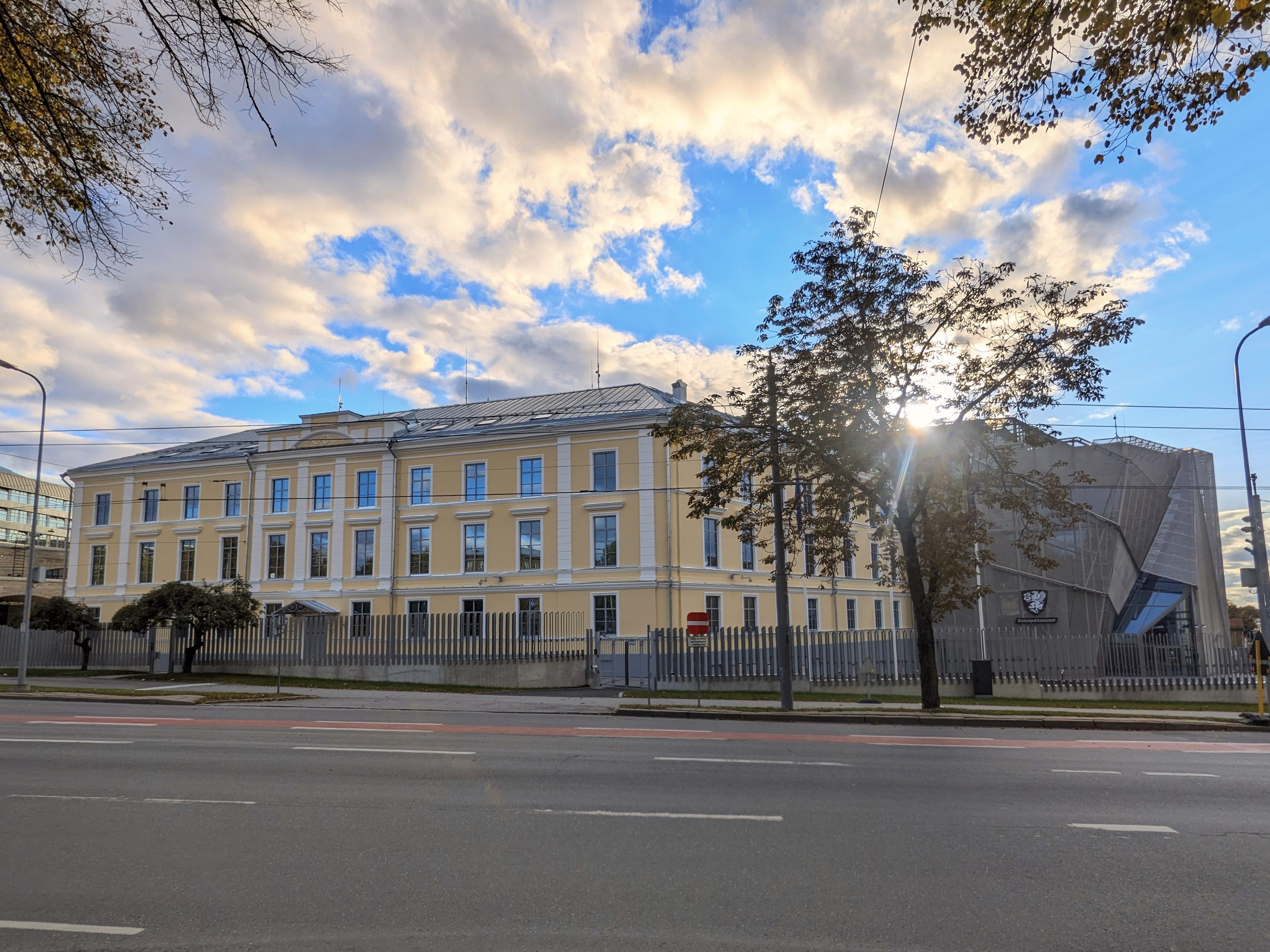
KAPO Headquarters in Tallinn

The Estonian Internal Security Service (Estonian: Kaitsepolitsei, officially Kaitsepolitseiamet, abbreviated KAPO) is the central national security agency of Estonia. Its primary responsibilities include protecting the constitutional order, conducting counterintelligence, and investigating specific criminal offenses. These include crimes committed by state officials, acts of terrorism, incitement to hatred, crimes against humanity, war crimes, and the illegal handling or trafficking of firearms, explosives, radioactive substances, and other strategic materials. The agency also protects state secrets and performs other internal security functions.

The Estonian Internal Security Service operates under the authority of the Ministry of the Interior. While many of its activities remain classified, the agency publishes an annual review (Estonian: Aastaraamat) of the national security situation since 1998.

== History ==
The Kaitsepolitseiamet was originally established on 12 April 1920. From 1925 to 1940, it was known as the Political Police (Poliitiline politsei, abbreviated PolPol). During this period, PolPol focused on countering the subversive activities of political extremists, espionage, desertion, smuggling, and terrorism. Among its main targets were the Communist Party of Estonia, which had been declared illegal following the failed December 1924 coup attempt. Operating underground and through legal front organizations, Estonian communists received support from the Soviet Union, which rejected parliamentary democracy and, in some instances, considered terrorism a legitimate political tool. PolPol also monitored pro-Nazi Baltic Germans and monarchist elements among the White Russian émigrés.

Following the Soviet annexation of Estonia on 17 June 1940, the Political Police was among the first institutions to be dismantled. Nearly all of its personnel were arrested and deported during the June deportations. By the end of World War II, more than 90% of its staff and their families had been killed.

=== Re-establishment ===
The Estonian Internal Security Service was re-established on 1 March 1991, as part of Estonia’s restoration of independence from Soviet occupation. Until 18 June 1993, the agency functioned as a department within the national police structure, after which it was reorganized as an independent institution. Following the adoption of a new law on security services on 1 March 2001, its status was changed from a police institution to a national security agency.

According to a 2009 Amnesty International report: "In June, the Estonian Security Police Board published its annual report which made serious allegations against the Legal Information Centre for Human Rights (LICHR), an NGO promoting and defending the rights of linguistic minorities. The report stated that the LICHR was used by the Russian Federation to carry out scientific research for propaganda purposes and accused the LICHR of trying to conceal the specific sources of funding it received from the Russian Federation. These allegations were widely seen as an attempt by the government to misrepresent the LICHR and to undermine its efforts to secure necessary financial and social support to carry out its work."

Additional criticism has come from Risto Teinonen, a Finnish lawyer and neo-Nazi living in Tallinn. In 2009, Teinonen initiated legal proceedings against the Estonian Internal Security Service, accusing the agency of politically motivated persecution of innocent people.

== See also ==
- Eston Kohver
