= Tatjana Ždanoka =

Latvian politician (born 1950)

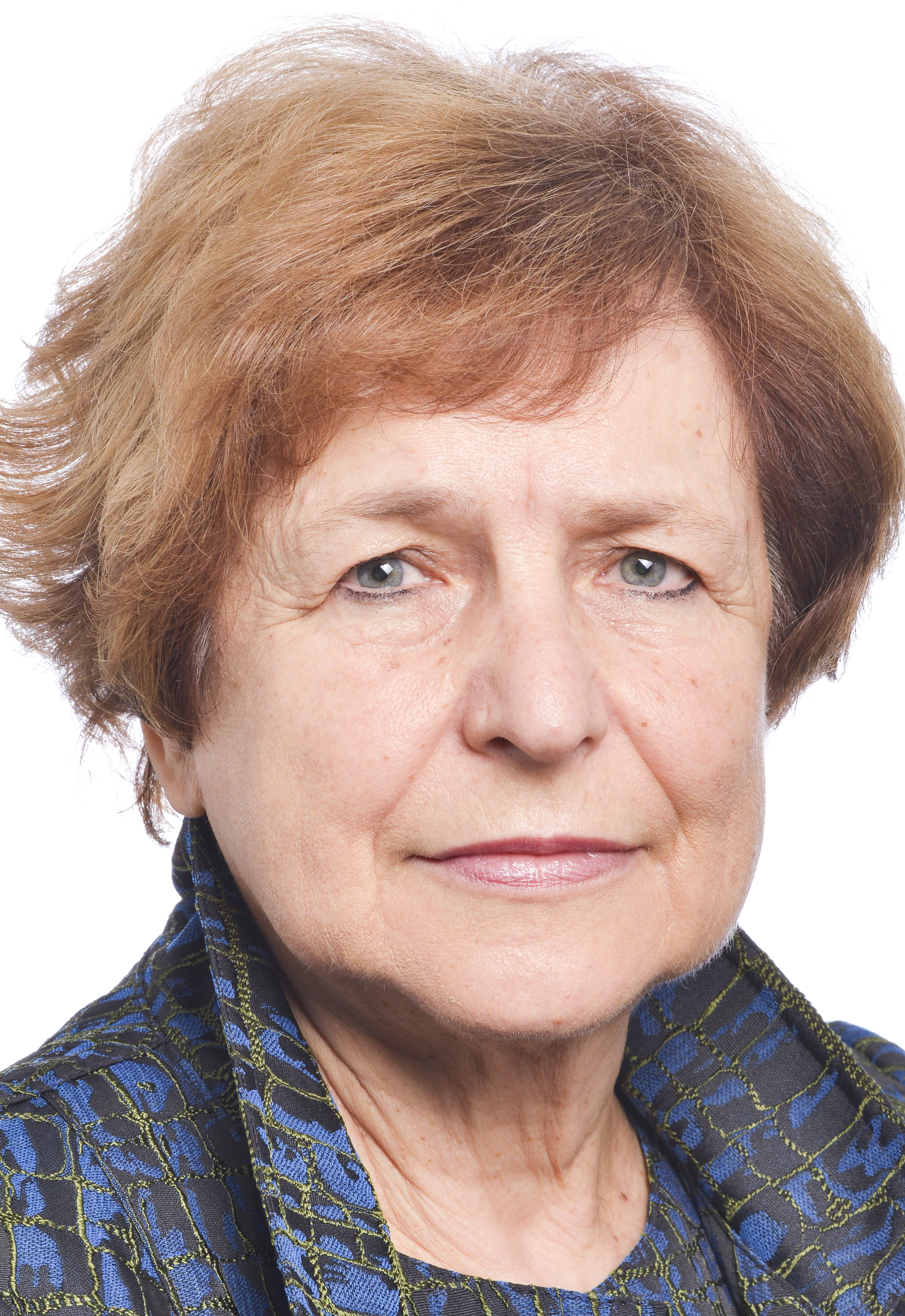

Member of the European Parliament
- In office 2 July 2019 – 15 July 2024
- Constituency: Latvia
- In office 20 July 2004 – 4 March 2018
- Constituency: Latvia

Member of the Supreme Council of Latvia
- In office 3 May 1990 – 6 July 1993

Personal details
- Born: Tatjana Hesina; 8 May 1950 (age 76) Riga, Latvian SSR, Soviet Union (now Latvia)
- Citizenship: USSR (1950–1991); Stateless (1991–1996); Latvia (since 1996)
- Party: LKS (2014–present)
- Other political affiliations: LKP (1971–1991); ER (1993–2007); ForHRUL (2007–2014)
- Spouse: Aleksandr Zhdanok (m. 1975; div. 1988)
- Education: Latvian State University
- Occupation: Politician • Mathematician
- Degree: Doctor of mathematics

Tatjana Ždanoka or Tatyana Zhdanok (Russian: Татьяна Аркадьевна Жданок, tr. Tatyana Arkadyevna Zhdanok; born 8 May 1950) is a Latvian politician and a former member of the European Parliament. She is co-chairwoman of the Latvian Russian Union and its predecessor parties (Equal Rights and For Human Rights in a United Latvia) since 1993. In 2024, leaked emails revealed her to being a Russian intelligence agent since at least 2004.

From 1988 to 1989 she was one of the leaders of the Interfront, a united front opposing Latvia's independence from the Soviet Union and rapid market reforms. She remained active in the Communist Party of Latvia after January 1991, when the party leadership opposed the restoration of Latvian independence and called for a coup d'état against the government of Latvia. In 1997, Ždanoka was elected to Riga municipal council, but was deprived of the mandate in the Council in 1999 and is prohibited from further nomination for election to the Latvian Parliament or local councils under Latvian law due to her former allegiance with the Communist Party after January 1991. Together with Alfrēds Rubiks, she is in the peculiar position of being restricted to European Parliament elections only. Leaked Russian government documents from 2024 linked her to the Russian Federal Security Service (FSB).

== Biography ==
Tatyana Khesin was born in 1950 in Riga in the family of Soviet navy officer Arkady Khesin and mathematics teacher Tamara Ivanovna, and is of mixed Latvian Jewish-Russian origin. Much of Ždanoka's paternal family was killed by the Latvian Auxiliary Police in 1941 during the Holocaust. In 1975, she married Aleksandr Zhdanok, whom she divorced in the late 1980s.

In 1972, Ždanoka graduated from the Latvian State University with a degree in mathematics and started teaching mathematics at the university until 1990. In 1980, she gained the Candidate of Sciences degree in physics and mathematics and in 1992 a Doctor of Sciences degree in mathematics, both from the Latvian State University.

After the restoration of the independence of Latvia, Ždanoka applied for Latvian citizenship through naturalisation but was denied since her paternal grandmother had moved to St. Peterburg before World War I and not returned to Latvia before 1940. In 1996, after a lengthy legal battle Ždanoka finally acquired Latvian citizenship, blaming her difficulties on anti-Semitism.

== Political career ==
=== Latvian politics (1988–2004) ===
Ždanoka became politically active in the late 1980s during the perestroika, first as a member of the Popular Front, then as one of the leaders of the Interfront, a united front opposing Latvia's independence from the Soviet Union. In 1989, she was elected to the Riga City Council, and in 1990, to the Supreme Soviet of the Latvian SSR. From 1971 to 1991 Ždanoka was also a member of the Communist Party of Latvia, but maintains she was "not part of the party hierarchy."

From 1995 to 2004 Ždanoka was co-chairwoman of the Latvian Human Rights Committee, a member of the International Federation for Human Rights. She has also been one of the leaders of the political party Equal Rights since it foundation in 1993 and of the political alliance For Human Rights in United Latvia.

In 1999, Ždanoka was banned from running for the Latvian parliament Saeima and deprived of her seat on Riga City Council, because she had participated in two seats of the Communist Party's Audit Committee after the party leadership called for a coup d'état against the elected government of the Latvian SSR in January 1991. Subsequently, she sued Latvia in the European Court of Human Rights. Ždanoka argued that the Communist Party was still legal until September 1991 and she had remained because she believed the Communist Party would be part of the democratic, multi-party system and "considered it dishonest to leave one's party because of hard times."

=== Member of the European parliament (2004–2018) ===
With the court case pending, the Latvian parliament decided not to impose restrictions on former members of the Communist Party in the 2004 European Parliament election. Ždanoka was elected to the European Parliament in June 2004 and won the court case a few days later with a margin of 5-2. Latvia appealed the decision to the Grand Chamber of the European Court of Human Rights on the grounds that Latvia's emergence from totalitarian rule brought about by the occupation of Latvia had not been sufficiently taken into account, and on March 16, 2006, the court ruled 13-4 that Ždanoka's rights had not been violated.

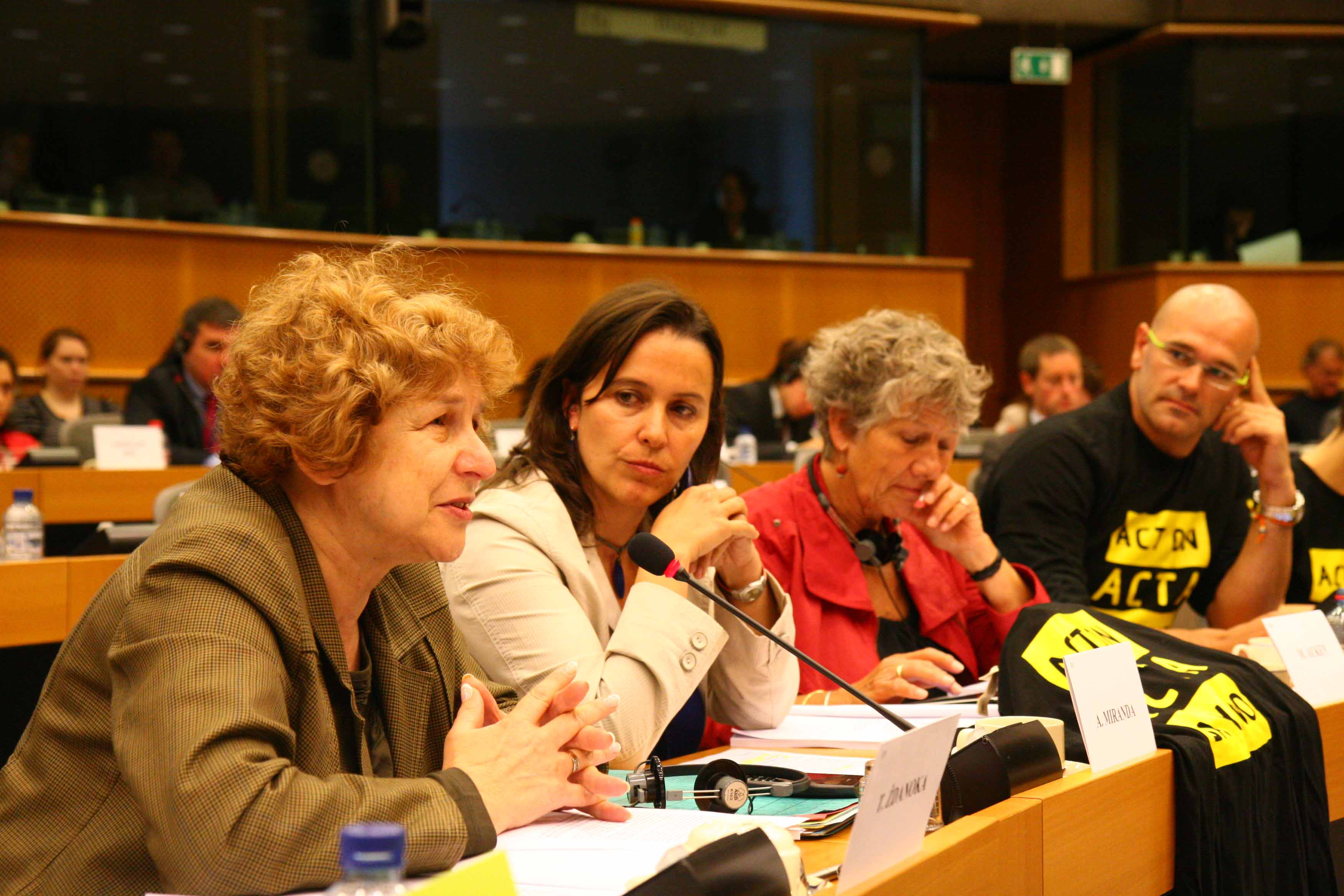
Ždanoka speaking at the European Parliament Committee on Petitions in 2012

In 2004, she ran successfully for MEP as a candidate of the largest Russian political bloc in Latvia becoming a member of the Greens–European Free Alliance fraction in the European Parliament. In 2005, Ždanoka became one of the founders of the EU Russian-Speakers' Alliance. She also won a MEP seat in 2009.

On 11 March 2014, Ždanoka and her party organized a rally at the European Commission Representation in Riga in support of the annexation of Crimea by the Russian Federation, with about 200 participants. In May, Ždanoka proposed European Council to classify Ukrainian political bloc Right Sector as a terrorist organization. In response, Ukrainian Congress of Latvia petitioned Ministry of Justice of Latvia to declare the political activities of Ždanoka and her party as anti-constitutional.

Ždanoka's participation in the controversial 2014 Crimean referendum as an international observer in a trip paid by the European Union and her remarks in support of it were criticised by the president of the European Parliament Martin Schulz as "completely contradictory to the position of the European Parliament and the EU." Ždanoka responded by stressing that Schulz is an MEP "just like she is", and that only her voters can tell her what to do. Co-chairwoman of the Greens/European Free Alliance Rebecca Harms called Ždanoka's actions and statements as "totally unacceptable" and "in complete and direct opposition with the very clear position the Greens/EFA group has taken since the outset on this issue", calling the European Free Alliance to expel Ždanoka from its ranks. Ždanoka's actions were also condemned by the Minister of Foreign Affairs of Latvia Edgars Rinkēvičs, with Ministry's press secretary Kārlis Eihenbaums claiming that Ždanoka did not to represent Latvia nor the EU, as she did not have any official authorization from either.

A submission was made by another Latvian MEP, Kārlis Šadurskis, to the Latvian state prosecutor to investigate Ždanoka for undermining the Latvian state in her support for Russia. In his submission, Šadurskis pointed to her participation at events organised by "Essence of Time" that advocates the restoration of the USSR. The application of Šadurskis was rejected by Security Police who did not find a crime in Ždanoka's actions.

In 2016, Ždanoka voted against the European Parliament resolution of 23 November that condemned the use of disinformation and propaganda by Russia and Islamist terrorist organisations and called for strengthening EU's "strategic communication" task force, as well as investing more in awareness raising, education, online and local media, investigative journalism and information literacy. Prior to the vote she distributed a letter to other MEPs, saying that the resolution crosses "all red lines" and that Russia's state-sponsored news and information channels are no different to Western media that exhibit "double standards", recommending them to watch Russia Today and form their own opinion of the channel.

=== Return to Latvian politics (2018–2019) ===
In January 2018, Ždanoka left European Parliament and returned to Latvian politics with the intention of running in the 2018 Latvian parliamentary election in October. She was named Latvian Russian Union's number 1 candidate for Vidzeme Region, but was removed from the list of candidates by Latvia's Central Election Commission on the same basis that barred her from running in 1999.

Ždanoka contested it in the Administrative District Court, but the court upheld the decision made by the Central Election Commission. European Court of Human Rights also later ruled unanimously "that restricting from standing for election individuals who had endangered and continued to endanger the independence of the Latvian State and the principles of a democratic State governed by the rule of law was legitimate and proportionate." and that "[t]he authorities had therefore acted within their discretion ("margin of appreciation") in doing so in Ms Ždanoka’s case."

=== Member of the European parliament (2019–2024) ===
In the 2019 European Parliament election her party received 6.24% of the votes, which gave it one seat at the European Parliament that, again, was filled by Ždanoka who personally received 18,098 plusses and was crossed out 739 times. She started serving as vice-chairperson in the Petitions Committee and replacement member in the Employment and Public Affairs Committee and named youth and pre-pension employment, adoption of benefits for young families and equalization of social rights in the European Union as her priorities.

On March 5, 2019, State Security Service (VDD) launched a criminal procedure over incitement to ethnic hatred or discord for Ždanoka's remarks at a discussion organized by her at the European Parliament, where she likened the situation of ethnic Russians and Russian speakers in Latvia to Jews prior the World War II. The case was terminated by the VDD in 2020, for absence of any crime in Ždanoka's remarks.

In 2020, Ždanoka, alongside her party members Miroslavs Mitrofanovs and Andrejs Mamikins, was included in the European Platform for Democratic Elections database of "biased observers" for backing disputed elections in Russia and Russian-occupied territories of Ukraine.

On 2 March 2022, she was one of 13 MEPs who voted against condemning the Russian invasion of Ukraine. For this she was eventually forced to leave the European Greens–European Free Alliance group. On 13 May, Ždanoka and six other people were detained in the Riga Town Hall Square at an unauthorized protest against the demolition of the Monument to the Liberators of Soviet Latvia and Riga from the German Fascist Invaders.

On 15 September 2022, she was one of 16 MEPs who voted against condemning president of Nicaragua Daniel Ortega for human rights violations, in particular the arrest of Bishop Rolando Álvarez.

On 20 April 2024, Ždanoka was barred from representing the European Parliament at conferences, foreign visits, and other events until the end of her current parliamentary term, as well as had her daily allowance for five days withheld for a total of EUR 1,750 for violating the European Parliament's code of conduct. She denied it being related to her cooperation with Russia, describing it as a "Parliament's punishment for the declaration of financial interests being inconsistent".

In 2024, a report from an investigative journalism website The Insider accused Ždanoka of being a spy for Russia's Federal Security Service (FSB) since at least 2004.

On 6 June 2024, Politico ranked Ždanoka as the "Russia-friendliest MEP" for having voted against 25 out of 26 resolutions critical of Russia between 2020 and 2024, abstaining only on the resolution condemning repression in Russia, in particular the cases of Vladimir Kara-Murza and Alexei Navalny.

== Views ==
In a 2001 interview, Ždanoka described herself as a social democrat "combining the good parts of socialism and capitalism". During perestroika, she advocated for economic reform within the Soviet Union and called the pro-independence Popular Front of Latvia "dangerously nationalistic". For a long time, she opposed the accession of Latvia to the European Union believing that "complete acceptance of the EU's rules would lead to the destruction of our industry and agriculture" and that Latvia should be a "financial bridge between the East and the West" but gave up her Euroscepticism after attending the 2000 New European Left Forum in Sweden. Ždanoka still continues opposing NATO and advocates for the Baltic region to retain its "historical closeness to Russia" as a way to avoid the "destruction of Russia and the whole region".

Ždanoka has also said that during the presidency of Boris Yeltsin she was "ashamed to admit" she was Russian, but "was no longer embarrassed for Russia and its leadership" when Vladimir Putin became president, although still critical of his state capitalism and corruption. She supports the recognition of Russian as an official language in Latvia and the European Union, pointing to the 9 million EU citizens who are native Russian speakers in the Baltic states and Southeast Europe.
