= First Optional Protocol to the International Covenant on Civil and Political Rights =

1966 United Nations treaty

Parties to the First Optional Protocol to the International Covenant on Civil and Political Rights State parties Signatories Non-parties

The First Optional Protocol to the International Covenant on Civil and Political Rights is an international treaty establishing an individual complaint mechanism for the International Covenant on Civil and Political Rights (ICCPR). It was adopted by the UN General Assembly on 16 December 1966, and entered into force on 23 March 1976. As of July 2024, it had 116 state parties and 35 signatories. Three of the ratifying states (Belarus, Jamaica and Trinidad and Tobago) have denounced the protocol.

== Summary ==
The Optional Protocol establishes an individual complaints mechanism for the ICCPR similar to those of the Optional Protocol to the Convention on the Rights of Persons with Disabilities and Article 14 of the Convention on the Elimination of All Forms of Racial Discrimination. Parties agree to recognise the competence of the UN Human Rights Committee (HRC) to consider complaints from individuals who claim their rights under the Covenant have been violated. Several complainants must have exhausted all domestic remedies, and anonymous complaints are not permitted. The Committee must bring complaints to the attention of the relevant party, which must respond within six months. Following consideration, the Committee must forward its conclusions to the party and the complainant.

While not expressly provided for in the Protocol, the HRC regards the recognition of its competence to hear complaints as imposing an obligation not to hinder access to the committee and to prevent any retaliation against complainants. It regards its findings as authoritative determinations of obligations under the Covenant, and their adoption as being required in order to provide an "effective remedy" under Article 2 of the ICCPR.

The Optional Protocol required ten ratifications to come into force.

== Reservations ==
A number of parties have made reservations and interpretative declarations to their application of the Optional Protocol.

Austria does not recognise the jurisdiction of the HRC to consider complaints which have already been examined by the European Commission on Human Rights.

Chile, Croatia, El Salvador, France, Germany, Guatemala, Malta, Russia, Slovenia, Sri Lanka, and Turkey consider the Optional Protocol to only apply to complaints which arose after it entered into force for those countries.

Croatia, Denmark, France, Germany, Iceland, Ireland, Italy, Luxembourg, Malta, Norway, Poland, Romania, Russia, Slovenia, Spain, Sri Lanka, Sweden, Turkey and Uganda do not recognise the jurisdiction of the HRC to consider complaints which have already been considered under another international complaint procedure.

Germany and Turkey do not recognise the jurisdiction of the HRC to hear complaints resulting from Article 26 of the ICCPR, covering discrimination and equality before the law, except insofar as they relate to rights expressly affirmed in the Covenant.

Guyana and Trinidad and Tobago do not recognise the jurisdiction of the HRC to hear complaints relating to their use of the death penalty.

Venezuela does not recognise the competence of the HRC to hear complaints regarding in-absentia trials for offences against the republic.

== Decisions ==
- Toonen v. Australia (1994) – held that sexual orientation was included in the treaty's antidiscrimination provisions as a protected status.
- Waldman v. Canada (1999) – religious discrimination in school funding.
- Diergaardt v. Namibia (2000) – linguistic discrimination in communication with authorities.
- Ignatāne v. Latvia (2001) – non-objective way of evaluating official language skills of a candidate in elections.
- Ioane Teitiota v. New Zealand (2020) - Without robust national and international efforts, the effects of climate change in receiving states may expose individuals to a violation of their rights under articles 6 or 7 of the Covenant, thereby triggering the non-refoulement obligations of sending states. However, it was not the case in this particular case.

== See also ==
- Optional Protocol to the Convention on the Elimination of All Forms of Discrimination against Women
- Optional Protocol to the Convention on the Rights of Persons with Disabilities
- Optional Protocol to the Convention on the Rights of the Child on a Communications Procedure
- Optional Protocol to the International Covenant on Economic, Social and Cultural Rights
- Second Optional Protocol to the International Covenant on Civil and Political Rights
