= United Nations Human Rights Committee =

United Nations treaty body

The United Nations Human Rights Committee is a treaty body composed of 18 experts, established by a 1966 human rights treaty, the International Covenant on Civil and Political Rights (ICCPR). The Committee meets for three four-week sessions per year to consider the periodic reports submitted by the 173 States parties to the ICCPR on their compliance with the treaty, and any individual petitions concerning the 116 States parties to the ICCPR's First Optional Protocol. The Committee is one of ten UN human rights treaty bodies, each responsible for overseeing the implementation of a particular treaty.

The UN Human Rights Committee should not be confused with the more high-profile UN Human Rights Council (HRC), or the predecessor of the HRC, the UN Commission on Human Rights. Whereas the Human Rights Council (since June 2006) and the Commission on Human Rights (before that date) are UN political bodies: composed of states, established by a UN General Assembly resolution and the UN Charter, and discussing the entire range of human rights concerns; the Human Rights Committee is a UN expert body: composed of persons, established by the ICCPR, and discussing matters pertaining only to that treaty. The Human Rights Committee is often referred to as CCPR (Committee on Civil and Political Rights) in order to avoid that confusion.

== Members ==
The ICCPR states the basic rules for the membership of the Human Rights Committee. Article 28 of the ICCPR states that the Committee is composed of 18 members from states parties to the ICCPR, "who shall be persons of high moral character and recognized competence in the field of human rights", with consideration "to the usefulness of the participation of some persons having legal experience." Also according to Article 28, the members serve in their individual capacity, rather than as representatives of their countries. As stated in Articles 29 and 30 of the ICCPR, they are elected by a meeting of the states parties to the ICCPR held at UN Headquarters. Under Article 32, they serve four-year terms, with one-half of their number elected every second year.

The current membership is as follows:

| Name | State | Term | Year First Joined |
|---|---|---|---|
| Tania María Abdo Rocholl | Paraguay | 2025–2028 | 2017 |
| Wafaa Ashraf Moharram Bassim | Egypt | 2025–2028 | 2021 |
| Rodrigo A. Carazo | Costa Rica | 2023-2026 | 2023 |
| Yvonne Donders | Netherlands | 2023-2026 | 2023 |
| Mahjoub El Haiba | Morocco | 2025–2028 | 2021 |
| Laurence R. Helfer | United States | 2023-2026 | 2023 |
| Carlos Ramón Fernandez Liesa | Spain | 2025–2028 | 2025 |
| Konstantin Korkelia | Georgia | 2025–2028 | 2025 |
| Bacre Waly Ndaiye | Senegal | 2023–2026 | 2022 |
| Hernán Quezada Cabrera | Chile | 2023-2026 | 2019 |
| Akmal Kholmatovich Saidov | Uzbekistan | 2025–2028 | 2025 |
| Changrok Soh | South Korea | 2025–2028 | 2021 |
| Tijana Šurlan | Serbia | 2023–2026 | 2023 |
| Ivan Simonovic | Croatia | 2025–2028 | 2025 |
| Koji Teraya | Japan | 2023-2026 | 2023 |
| Hélène Tigroudja | France | 2023-2026 | 2019 |
| Imeru Tamerat Yigezu | Ethiopia | 2025–2028 | 2021 |
| Dalia Leinarte | Lithuania | 2023–2026 | |

=== Recent elections ===
Human rights committee car in Dnipro, Ukraine during war.

On June 17, 2022, the States parties to the ICCPR met in New York and elected nine members of the Committee, to replace those whose terms would expire at the end of 2022. There were seventeen candidates for the nine positions, including one whose nomination was late. Those elected were Yvonne Donders (The Netherlands), Hélène Tigroudja* (France), Bacre Waly Ndiaye (Senegal), Tijana Šurlan (Serbia), Koji Teraya (Japan), Farid Ahmadov (Azerbaijan), Laurence R. Helfer (United States), Rodrigo A. Carazo (Costa Rica), and Hernán Quezada Cabrera* (Chile). Asterisks denote sitting members who were re-elected.

== Meetings and activities ==
The Committee meets three times a year for four-week sessions (spring session at UN headquarters in New York, summer and fall sessions at the UN Office in Geneva). The categories of its work, outlined below, include state reporting, individual complaints, general comments, and inter-state communications.

== State reporting under the ICCPR ==
All states parties to the ICCPR have an obligation "to submit reports on the measures they have adopted which give effect to the rights recognized [in the ICCPR] and on the progress made in the enjoyment of those rights." The Human Rights Committee is responsible for "study[ing]" and responding to those reports submitted by states. States parties must submit an initial report within one year of the ICCPR's entry into force, and subsequent periodic reports as requested by the Committee. This reporting system is mandated by Article 40 of the ICCPR.

The frequency of the periodic reports was formerly about every five years, but starting in 2020 is every eight years. The UN has published guidance for states on reporting to the Committee and other human rights treaty bodies. The principal purpose of the report is to promote state compliance with the treaty principles and it should be an "honest appraisal of their conformity to the treaty obligations".

=== Procedure, and recent procedural changes ===
Following the submission of a state's report, representatives of the state appear before the Committee in Geneva or New York to discuss the report, in an in-person constructive dialogue which is generally webcast live on UN Web TV. Following this dialogue, the Committee drafts and adopts its concluding observations, a document including positive aspects, subjects of concern, and suggestions and recommendations. Subsequently, under its follow-up procedure, the Committee assesses whether certain recommendations have been fulfilled within one year.

In July 2010, the Committee proposed a new optional reporting procedure called the "List of Issues Prior to Reporting" (LOIPR) or "Simplified Reporting Procedure". Under this system, instead of the state submitting a full report on its implementation of each article of the ICCPR, the Committee sends the state a list of issues to address, and the state's report must only answer the questions raised in that list of issues. The Committee subsequently adopted the simplified reporting procedure on a pilot basis, although it remains an optional alternative to the "regular" procedure, i.e., submission of a full report. At its 124th session in 2018, the Committee decided to adopt the simplified reporting procedure on a permanent basis, and to encourage all states to switch to simplified reporting. It also decided to strive to limit the number of questions in each list of issues to 25. In 2019, the Committee decided to make the simplified reporting procedure the default, changing a state's selection of it from an opt-in to an opt-out model.

In July 2019 the Committee decided to move, beginning in 2020, to an eight-year "Predictable Review Cycle" (PRC), under which it would schedule one review for each state party (including those states that failed to report). This cycle involves a five-year review process, and a three-year interval before the next review process begins. All states parties were divided into 8 groups of 21-22 states each, with the reporting process to start for each group on a different year.

=== NGO participation ===
NGOs and other civil society organizations play a crucial role in the reporting process. Any NGO, regardless of accreditation, may submit its own reports (sometimes called "shadow reports") to the Committee, comment on state reports, and attend all Committee sessions as observers. Furthermore, the Committee often holds a closed meeting with interested NGOs as part of its review of a state's report.

=== Limitations of the reporting system ===
One set of weaknesses is inherent to a system of self-reporting. Though in theory, reports should be an honest appraisal, constructive criticism of perceived failures to adhere to Covenant principles is unlikely. The Centre for Civil and Political Rights, an NGO, states that "State reports often . . . fail to describe the implementation of the Covenant in practice" and "frequently lack an honest evaluation of the difficulties the State faces in implementing the rights guaranteed under the Covenant."

Late reporting and non-reporting by states is another problem. The Committee's annual report through March 2019 stated that fifteen states' "initial reports are overdue, of which 7 are overdue by between 5 and 10 years and 8 are overdue by 10 years or more." The report's Annex IV listed them; Equatorial Guinea's initial report was 30 years overdue. That Annex also listed thirteen states whose periodic reports were ten years or more overdue, with Afghanistan's overdue by 22 years, and Nigeria's overdue by 19; ten states whose periodic reports were five to ten years overdue; and 28 states whose periodic reports were overdue by less than five years. CSW, a UK-based NGO, asserts that "there remains a relatively low level of engagement and implementation of recommendations" on the part of States, and that the level of States compliance with treaty body recommendations is only 19%.

Other widely noted problems include the backlog of the Committee and the heavy burden on states, particularly small states.

== Individual complaints to the committee ==
States that are party to the First Optional Protocol to the ICCPR (currently 116 countries) have agreed to allow persons within their jurisdiction to submit complaints ("individual communications") to the Committee claiming that their rights under the ICCPR have been violated. The ICCPR is one of eight UN human rights treaties with individual complaints procedures available; two other treaties state such procedures that are not yet in force.

=== Procedure ===
Before considering the merits (substance) of an individual communication, the Committee must be satisfied that it is admissible. The Committee may review many factors in determining admissibility and may conclude that, for an individual communication to be admissible, it must:

- be submitted by an individual victim whose rights have been personally violated, or be submitted with sufficient authorization of such an individual, or otherwise justify the reasons for being submitted on behalf of another. The Communication cannot be anonymous;
- relate to a right actually protected under the ICCPR;
- relate to events that occurred after entry into force of the First Optional Protocol for the state in question (with some exceptions, developed by the Committee);
- be sufficiently substantiated;
- show that domestic remedies have been exhausted;
- not be under consideration by another international investigation or settlement procedure;
- not be precluded by a reservation to the ICCPR by the state in question; and
- not be frivolous, vexatious, or otherwise an abuse of process.

Individual communications that contain the necessary prima facie elements are referred to the Committee's Special Rapporteur on New Communications and Interim Measures, who decides whether the case should be registered. At that point, the case is transmitted to the State party, which is requested to submit its observations within six months, under Article 4 of the First Optional Protocol. Once the State replies to the complaint, the complainant is offered an opportunity to comment, within a set time frame. If the Committee concludes that a violation of the ICCPR has taken place, in its follow-up procedure the Committee invites the State to provide information within 180 days on its steps to implement the Committee's recommendations. The State's response is transmitted to the complainant for comments. If the State party fails to take appropriate action, the Committee keeps the case under consideration. Thus, the Committee maintains a dialogue with the State party and the case remains open until satisfactory measures are taken.

The Committee considers individual communications in closed session, but its decisions ("Views") and any follow-up are public. Given the large number of complaints, several years may elapse between submission of a complaint and the Committee's decision on it.

Information on the process and how to use it, including examples and guidelines for submitting complaints, is available from some NGOs and the United Nations.

=== Decisions ===
All Committee decisions on individual complaints are available in online compilations published by UN, NGO, and academic sources.

The Committee has received thousands of complaints since its inception. A few of its decisions that are notable are listed below, in reverse chronological order. Among more recent decisions that attracted press and academic attention, in two October 2018 decisions the Committee concluded that France's ban on the niqab, the full-face Islamic veil, violated human rights guaranteed under the ICCPR, in particular the rights to manifest one's religion or beliefs and protection against discrimination.

| Case name | Communication number | Year decided | Topic |
|---|---|---|---|
| Portillo Cáceres v. Paraguay | 2751/2016 | 2019 | Failure to address pesticide poisoning |
| Mellet v. Ireland | 2324/2013 | 2016 | Law prohibiting termination of pregnancy |
| Androsenko v. Belarus | 2092/2011 | 2016 | Mistreatment of Minsk Pride protesters by police |
| Shikhmuradova v. Turkmenistan | 2069/2011 | 2015 | Enforced disappearance and unfair trial of former Foreign Minister Boris Şyhmyradow |
| Nystrom v. Australia | 1557/2007 | 2011 | Expulsion from country of residence |
| Raihman v. Latvia | 1621/2007 | 2010 | State's modification of person's name |
| Bergauer v. Czech Republic | 1748/2008 | 2010 | 1945 "Beneš decrees" disenfranchising ethnic Germans and Hungarians |
| Kulov v. Kyrgyzstan | 1369/2005 | 2010 | Detention of opposition leader, and conviction after an unfair trial |
| Marinich v. Belarus | 1502/2006 | 2010 | Conviction of opposition leader accompanied with unfair trial, unlawful detention, inhuman conditions of detention |
| Milinkievič v. Belarus | 1553/2007 | 2009 | Seizure and destruction of election leaflets |
| Zundel v. Canada | 1341/2005 | 2007 | Denial of citizenship and deportation based on Holocaust denial |
| Arenz v. Germany | 1138/2002 | 2004 | Declaration by political party that Scientology is incompatible with membership |
| Svetik v. Belarus | 927/2000 | 2004 | Conviction for calling for abstention from voting in election |
| Mátyus v. Slovakia | 923/2000 | 2002 | Apportionment; establishment of voting districts disproportional to population |
| Ignatāne v. Latvia | 884/1999 | 2001 | Annulment of candidacy for election based on language test |
| Diergaardt v. Namibia | 760/1997 | 2000 | Policy prohibiting use of Afrikaans language |
| Ross v. Canada | 736/1997 | 2000 | Firing of teacher for controversial, allegedly religious opinions |
| Waldman v. Canada | 694/1996 | 1999 | Different levels of public funding for religious schools of different religions |
| Polay v. Peru | 577/1994 | 1998 | Unlawful trial and imprisonment |
| Faurisson v. France | 550/1993 | 1996 | Law prohibiting Holocaust denial |
| Ballantyne v. Canada | 359/1989, 385/1989 | 1993 | Quebec laws requiring use of French language |
| Toonen v. Australia | 488/1992 | 1992 | Criminalization of sexual contacts between men |
| Bithashwiwa v. Zaire | 241/1987 and 242/1987 | 1989 | Arrest and banishment of persons including politician Étienne Tshisekedi |
| Baboeram v. Suriname | 146/1983, et al. | 1985 | "December murders" of prominent government critics |
| Pinkney v. Canada | 27/1978 | 1984 | Alleged mistrial, prison conditions |
| Sendic v. Uruguay | R.14/63 | 1981 | Unlawful arrest, detention, torture, and trial of political activist |

== General comments ==
To date the Committee has issued 36 "General Comments", each of which provides detailed guidance on particular parts of the ICCPR.

The Committee has circulated a draft of its next, forthcoming General Comment, General Comment 37 on ICCPR Article 21, the right of peaceful assembly, seeking public comments on the draft by an extended deadline of February 21, 2020. The draft has been criticized for its reliance on decisions of regional, as opposed to global, human rights bodies.

The Committee's most recent General Comment (of October 30, 2018) was General Comment 36 on ICCPR Article 6, on the right to life (replacing General Comments 6 and 14, of 1982 and 1984, respectively). Of its seventy paragraphs, twenty address capital punishment, in a section headed "The death penalty." One commentator has stated that its description of how the right to life applies during situations of armed conflict and its statement of the relationship between international human rights law and international humanitarian law are noteworthy.

In December 2014 the Committee issued General Comment 35 on ICCPR Article 9, "liberty and security of person".

In July 2011, the UN Human Rights Committee adopted a 52-paragraph statement, General Comment 34 on ICCPR Article 19, concerning freedoms of opinion and expression. Paragraph 48 states:

Prohibitions of displays of lack of respect for a religion or other belief system, including blasphemy laws, are incompatible with the Covenant, except in the specific circumstances envisaged in article 20, paragraph 2, of the Covenant. Such prohibitions must also comply with the strict requirements of article 19, paragraph 3, as well as such articles as 2, 5, 17, 18 and 26. Thus, for instance, it would be impermissible for any such laws to discriminate in favor of or against one or certain religions or belief systems, or their adherents over another, or religious believers over non-believers. Nor would it be permissible for such prohibitions to be used to prevent or punish criticism of religious leaders or commentary on religious doctrine and tenets of faith.

== Inter-State communications ==
The Covenant provides for inter-State complaints "that enables one State Party to charge another with a violation to the treaty." "[N]o interstate complaint mechanism has yet been submitted" (up to 2009). This is still a matter of jurisdiction and it is optional to the committee of whether or not they will accept such complaint or not.
