= Slivenko v. Latvia =

2003 European Court of Human Rights case

- Court: European Court of Human Rights
- Decided: 9 October 2003
- Citation: ECLI:CE:ECHR:2003:1009JUD004832199

Court membership
- Judges sitting: L. Wildhaber, C.L. Rozakis, J.-P. Costa, G. Ress, N. Bratza, J. Makarczyk, I. Cabral Barreto, F. Tulkens, V. Strážnická, P. Lorenzen, M. Tsatsa-Nikolovska, H. S. Greve, A. B. Baka, Rait Maruste, K. Traja, S. Botoucharova, A. Kovler

Case opinions
- Majority: Rozakis, Costa, Tulkens, Makarczyk, Strážnická, Lorenzen, Tsatsa-Nikolovska, Baka, Traja, Botoucharova; Partial concurrence and partial dissent: Kovler; Joint dissent: Wildhaber, Ress, Bratza, Cabral Barreto, Greve, Maruste; Dissent: Maruste

Keywords
- Private life, residence

Slivenko v. Latvia (48321/99) was a case argued before the European Court of Human Rights and decided in 2003.

== Facts ==
Ms. Tatjana Slivenko (Sļivenko) was born in the Estonian Soviet Socialist Republic in 1959 and at the age of one month she moved to Latvia together with her parents. Her husband, N. Slivenko, born in 1952, was transferred to Latvia in 1977 to serve as a Soviet military officer. He met T. Slivenko in Latvia and married her there in 1980. In 1981, T. Slivenko gave birth to their daughter Karina Sļivenko.

After Latvia regained independence, the already retired N. Slivenko was ordered to leave the country as a former Soviet/Russian officer by the Citizenship and Migration Authority, referring to the Russian-Latvian treaty of 1994. K. and T. Slivenko were ordered to leave Latvia, too, as members of N. Slivenko's family. T. Slivenko contested this decision, referring to the facts that she was a daughter of permanent residents of Latvia and she didn't come to Latvia as wife of N. Slivenko.

After unsuccessful court proceedings, all three Slivenkos left Latvia, leaving there the parents of T. Slivenko. They contested their deportation before the European Court of Human Rights (ECtHR). Third-party comments were received from the Russian Government, having exercised its right to intervene. In 2001, the Second Section of ECtHR has relinquished jurisdiction in favour of the Grand Chamber. In 2002, the Grand Chamber dismissed claims by N. Slivenko as inadmissible, but declared admissible the application of T. Slivenko and K. Slivenko concerning Articles 5, 8 and 14.

== Judgment ==
In the court' s evaluation, a scheme for withdrawal of foreign troops and their families based on a general finding that their removal was necessary for national security was not as such incompatible with Article 8, but implementation of such a scheme without any possibility of taking into account individual circumstances was. T. and K. Slivenkos were integrated into Latvian society at the time and could not be regarded as endangering national security because they were part of T. Slivenko's father's family, who had retired in 1986, had remained in Latvia and was not himself considered to present any such danger.

The court therefore has found a violation of the Article 8 of ECHR in respect of K. Slivenko and T. Slivenko and no need to deal separately with the complaints under Article 14, by 11 votes against 6. The court has concluded besides, that there was no violation of Article 5, by 16 votes against 1.

Judges Wildhaber, Ress, Bratza, Cabral Barreto, Greve and Maruste have filed dissenting opinions, considering that Article 8 wasn't violated. Judge Kovler has filed an opinion dissenting in part, considering that Article 5 was violated, too, and concurring in part concerning Article 8.
