= Podkolzina v. Latvia =

- Court: European Court of Human Rights
- Decided: 9 April 2002
- Citation: ECLI:CE:ECHR:2002:0409JUD004672699

Court membership
- Judges sitting: N. Bratza, E. Palm, J. Makarczyk, V. Strážnická, M. Fischbach, J. Casadevall, R. Maruste

Case opinions
- Unanimous

Keywords
- Language, eligibility

Podkolzina v. Latvia (46726/99) was a case argued before the European Court of Human Rights and decided in 2002.

== Facts ==
Mrs. I. Podkolzina, member of Equal Rights party was included in the list of the candidates of the National Harmony Party for 1998 parliamentary elections, submitted in July. At the time of the registration of its list of candidates the party supplied the Central Electoral Commission with all the documents required, including a copy of the certificate attesting to the fact that the applicant knew the State's official language – Latvian.

On 6 and 7 August 1998 an examiner employed by the State Language Inspectorate, went to the applicant's place of work and examined her to assess her knowledge of Latvian. The examiner then drew up a report to the effect that the applicant did not have an adequate command of the official language at the "third level", the highest of the three categories of competence defined in Latvian regulations and the one then required for eligibility in parliament. By a decision of 21 August 1998 the Central Electoral Commission struck the applicant's name out of the list of candidates.

The NHP, acting on the applicant's behalf, asked the Riga Regional Court to set aside the above decision. The court held that there had been no breach of the law.

== Proceedings ==
The applicant was represented before ECtHR first by I. Oziša, member of Latvian Human Rights Committee, and later by W. Bowring, a British barrister. The Latvian Government were represented by their agent K. Maļinovska. By a decision of 8 February 2001 the Chamber declared the application admissible.

== Judgment ==
On 9 April 2002 ECHR has delivered a unanimous judgment. The Court emphasised that the validity of the applicant's certificate was never questioned by the Latvian authorities. It further noted that it was issued to the applicant after an examination organised by a board composed of five examiners. The Court noted that "the procedure followed differed fundamentally from the normal procedure for certification of linguistic competence, which is governed by the above-mentioned regulation of 25 May 1992. In particular, the additional verification to which the applicant was subjected was carried out by one examiner instead of a board of experts and the examiner was not required to observe the procedural safeguards and assessment criteria laid down in the regulation. Thus the full responsibility for assessing the applicant's linguistic knowledge was left to a single civil servant, who had exorbitant power in the matter. Moreover, the Court can only express its surprise over the fact – related by the applicant and not disputed by the Government – that during the examination the applicant was questioned mainly about the reasons for her political orientation" (see para. 36).

Considering the Riga Regional Court's judgment, ECHR held that its sole basis was the certificate drawn up by the State Language Centre after the examination in issue; it did not rule on the other evidence in the file. The Court therefore considered that "in admitting as irrebuttable evidence the results of an examination the procedure for which lacked the fundamental guarantees of fairness, the Regional Court deliberately avoided providing a remedy for the violation committed" (see para. 37). Therefore, the Court has found a violation of Article 3 of Protocol No. 1 in the case and ordered Latvia to pay Podkolzina 9000 euros. The Court found it unnecessary to examine complaints under Articles 13 and 14 separately.

== Aftermath ==
Though the ECtHR judgment didn't require Latvia to abolish language requirements for candidates, it did so in May, 2002, after indications of desirability from George Robertson, US government and OSCE High Commissioner on National Minorities.
