= Hélène Tigroudja =

French jurist and international law expert

- Born: July 19, 1975 (age 51); Lille, France
- Education: Sciences Po Lille
- Occupation: Jurist
- Years active: 1997-present
- Employer: University of Lille

Hélène Tigroudja (born 19 July 1975) is a French jurist and international law expert. Since 2019, she has been a member of the Human Rights Committee, the United Nations body in charge of monitoring compliance with the International Covenant on Civil and Political Rights.
