= Declaration of financial interests =

Mean of making conflict of interest known

Declarations of financial interests are a means of making conflicts of interest of people in public office known and to reduce them by making them public.

== European Parliament ==
Members of the European Parliament (MEPs) are required to declare their financial interests or assets that could create a situation of conflict in the performance of their duties.

As in a majority of the Member States, Members of the European Parliament have an obligation to declare their financial interests at the moment of taking office as well as orally when a Member has an interest in one of the issues being debated at a sitting.

Members of the European Parliament are also required to update their declaration of financial interests every year. Their declarations are included in the public register kept by the Quaestors. The register is public and may be consulted by anyone in Parliament's three places of work (Strasbourg, Luxembourg and Brussels) via the Internet on the MEP's page in the online register.

In vote on March 11, 1999, about the report A4-0070/99 (Corbett, Gutiérrez Diaz, Palacio Vallelersundi) was adopted, numerous changes to the Rules of Procedure of the European Parliament designed to enable Parliament to adjust to the workings of the Amsterdam Treaty have been adopted:

MEPs voted to tighten the rules relating to the declaration of financial interests. The rule thus stipulates that the names of members who have not completed the register within the due time limit will be published in the minutes after due warning. The rule then goes on to state "if the member continues to refuse to submit the declaration after the infringement has been published, The President shall take action in accordance with Rule 124 to suspend the member concerned."

The original proposal to oblige members to declare all benefits above .100 was not approved, but another amendment designed to exclude members not completing the register from office in the Parliament did go through as did the amendment obliging chairmen of intergroups and other unofficial grouping to declare all forms of financial or secretarial support.
