= Optional Protocol to the Convention on the Elimination of All Forms of Discrimination Against Women =

1999 United Nations protocol

OP-CEDAW
Optional Protocol to the Convention on the Elimination of All Forms of Discrimination against Women
- Signed: 6 October 1999
- Location: New York
- Effective: 22 December 2000
- Condition: 10 ratifications
- Signatories: 80
- Parties: 115
- Depositary: UN Secretary-General
- Languages: Arabic, Chinese, English, French, Russian, and Spanish

The Optional Protocol to the Convention on the Elimination of All Forms of Discrimination against Women (OP-CEDAW) is an international treaty which establishes complaint and inquiry mechanisms for the Convention on the Elimination of All Forms of Discrimination Against Women (CEDAW). Parties to the Protocol allow the Committee on the Elimination of Discrimination against Women to hear complaints from individuals or inquire into "grave or systematic violations" of the convention. The Protocol has led to a number of decisions against member states on issues such as domestic violence, parental leave and forced sterilization, as well as an investigation into the systematic killing of women in the Mexican city of Ciudad Juárez, Chihuahua.

The Protocol was adopted by the United Nations General Assembly on 6 October 1999, and in force from 22 December 2000. As of October 2023, the Protocol has 80 signatories and 115 parties.

== Genesis ==
In 1979, the United Nations General Assembly adopted the Convention on the Elimination of All Forms of Discrimination Against Women (CEDAW). The Convention outlawed discrimination against women, but did not include any mechanism by which this prohibition could be legally enforced.

An individual complaints mechanism was suggested during the original drafting of CEDAW, but was rejected at the time. Fifteen years later, the Vienna Declaration and Programme of Action of the 1993 World Conference on Human Rights suggested that new procedures were needed to implement the convention, and suggested a "right of petition". An independent expert group produced a draft in 1994, containing a complaint procedure and an inquiry procedure, and this was adopted for further study by the Committee on the Elimination of Discrimination against Women in early 1995. The idea of an Optional Protocol was further endorsed by the Fourth World Conference on Women in 1995, which called for "the elaboration (of) a draft optional protocol to the Women's Convention that could enter into force as soon as possible."

In March 1996 the Commission on the Status of Women established an open-ended working group to produce a formal draft. This reported back after three years of deliberation in early 1999. The Optional Protocol was adopted by the UN General Assembly on 6 October 1999.

== Summary ==
The Convention on the Elimination of All Forms of Discrimination against Women outlaws discrimination on the basis of gender, and obliges its parties to repeal discriminatory laws and guarantee equality in the fields of health, employment, and education. The Optional Protocol is a subsidiary agreement to the convention. It does not establish any new rights, but rather allows the rights guaranteed in the convention to be enforced.

Articles 1–7 create an individual complaints mechanism similar to those of the First Optional Protocol to the International Covenant on Civil and Political Rights, Optional Protocol to the Convention on the Rights of Persons with Disabilities and Article 14 of the Convention on the Elimination of All Forms of Racial Discrimination. Parties agree to recognise the competence of the Committee on the Elimination of Discrimination against Women to consider complaints "by or on behalf of" individuals or groups who claim their rights under the Convention have been violated. If a complaint is submitted on behalf of a victim, then this requires their consent, unless the submitter can justify acting without it. What constitutes "justification" in such a case is up to the committee. The ability for complaints to be submitted on behalf of victims is seen as vital in allowing NGOs such as women's organizations and human rights groups to use the Protocol to enforce the convention.

Complainants must have exhausted all domestic remedies, and anonymous complaints and complaints referring to events which occurred before the country concerned joined the Optional Protocol are not permitted. The committee can request information from and make recommendations to a party, though these are not binding.

Articles 8–10 create an inquiry mechanism. Parties may permit the committee to investigate, report on and make recommendations on "grave or systematic violations" of the convention. The Committee may invite the relevant party to respond and inform it of any measures taken as a result of such an inquiry, either directly or through the normal reporting process under the convention. Parties may opt out of this obligation on signature or ratification, but only Bangladesh, Belize, Colombia, Cuba and Tajikistan have done so.

Article 11 requires parties to ensure that those complaining under the Optional Protocol are not subjected to ill-treatment or intimidation.

Article 13 requires parties to inform their citizens about the convention, the Optional Protocol, and the rulings of the committee, so as to facilitate complaints.

Articles 12 and 14 govern the procedure and reporting of the Committee in handling complaints.

Articles 15–21 govern ratification, entry into force, and amendment of the Optional Protocol.

== Reservations and membership ==
Global participation in OP-CEDAW Signed and ratified Acceded or succeeded Signed and ratified, but does not recognise competence for Articles 8 and 9 Only signed, not ratified Not signed

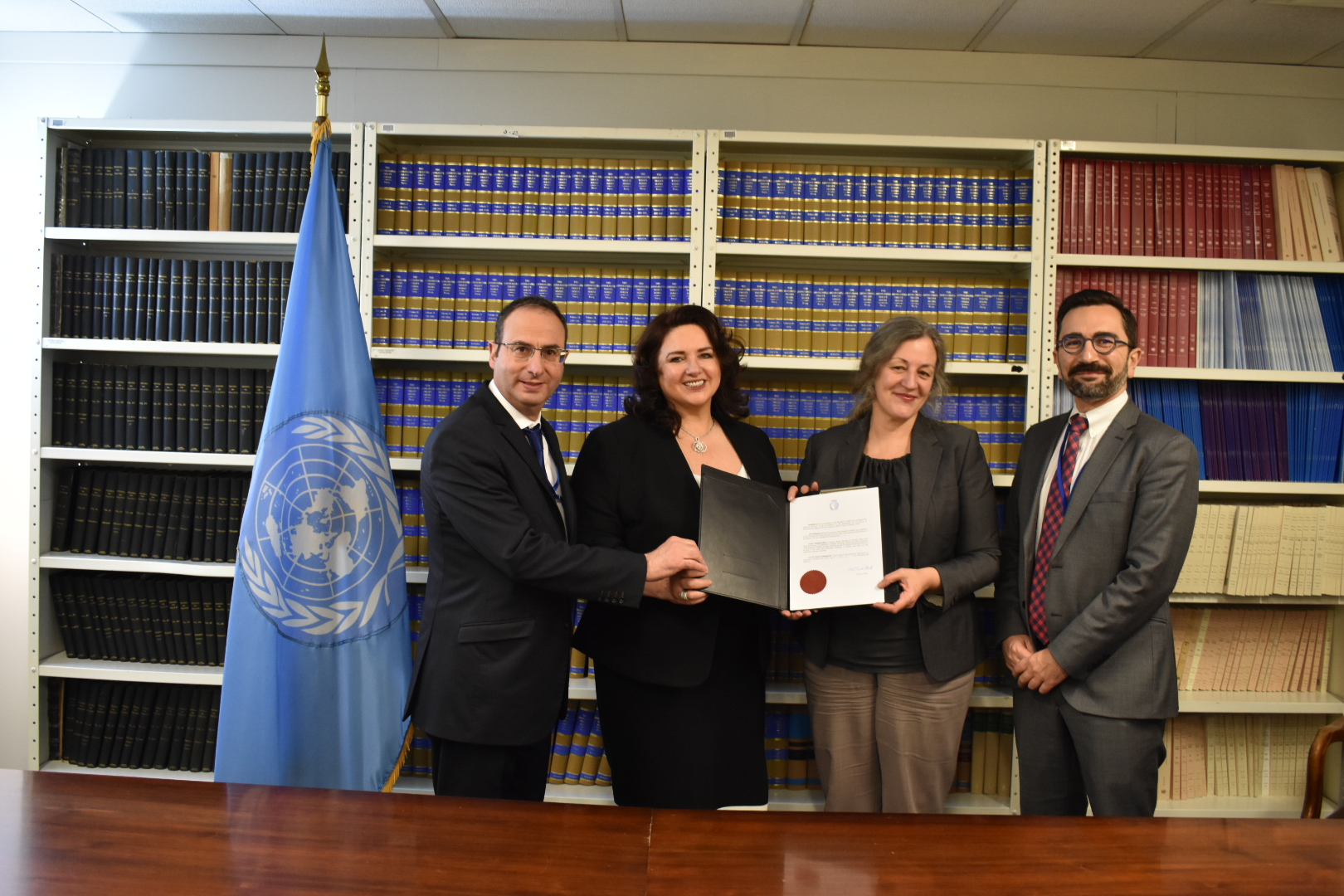
Helena Dalli submitting Malta's instrument of accession to OP-CEDAW at the UN Headquarters in March 2019

A number of parties have made reservations and interpretative declarations to their application of the Protocol. Bangladesh, Belize and Colombia have exercised their right under Article 10 of the Protocol not to recognise the jurisdiction of the committee to investigate "grave or systematic violations" of the convention. Colombia declares that neither the Protocol nor the committee can require it to decriminalise "offences against life or personal integrity".

Not every state which is a party to CEDAW is a party to the Protocol, and several major states still remain outside the Protocol. The United States has not become a signatory because it has not yet ratified CEDAW. Japan does not participate in any of the individual communications mechanisms for human rights treaties, but is currently considering joining while observing how these procedures are functioning. China is currently "studying the problem of accession to the Optional Protocol".

== Individual complaints ==
The Committee on the Elimination of Discrimination against Women has considered eleven complaints against seven countries since the Optional Protocol came into force, on subjects such as domestic violence, division of property, forced sterilization and parental leave. Six complaints were rejected for lack of jurisdiction or because the complainants had not exhausted all domestic remedies. The other five decisions are summarised below:

In 2005, in the case of A.T. v. Hungary, the Committee ruled that Hungary had violated numerous articles of the convention by failing to adequately protect women against domestic violence. It recommended that the complainant be immediately protected from her abusive former partner, and that Hungary improve its handling of domestic violence cases and immediately adopt the committee's previous recommendation for a law allowing protection and exclusion orders. The recommendations were implemented by the time of Hungary's sixth periodic report to the Committee in 2006.

In 2006, in the case of Dung Thi Thuy Nguyen v. The Netherlands, the Committee expressed concerns about aspects of parental leave provisions in The Netherlands. It recommended the Dutch government collect further information on the number of women combining part-time salaried employment with self-employment, and review the law if this revealed that a significant number of women were disadvantaged.

In 2006, in the case of A.S. vs Hungary, the Committee ruled that the forced sterilization of a Romani woman in Hungary violated the convention. It recommended compensating the complainant for the breach of her rights, a full review of legislation surrounding informed consent in cases of sterilisation to ensure it complied with international human rights standards, and ongoing monitoring of Hungarian medical facilities to ensure that any changes were put into practice.

In 2007, in the cases of Şahide Goekce (deceased) v. Austria and Fatma Yildirim (deceased) v. Austria, the Committee ruled that the Austrian government was failing to protect women from domestic violence. It recommended strengthening the implementation and monitoring of existing domestic violence laws and greater training for police.

== Inquiries ==
The committee has also conducted one inquiry into "grave or systematic violations" under Article 8, in relation to the systematic killing of women in the Mexican city of Ciudad Juárez, Chihuahua. This found "serious lapses in compliance" by the Mexican government and tolerance of severe and systematic abuses of women's rights. The Committee recommended the involvement of federal as well as state authorities in the investigation of the murders, the punishment of negligent or complicit officials and those involved in the persecution of victims' relatives, and increased violence prevention plans.

== Impact and criticism ==
The impact of an international treaty can be measured in two ways: by its acceptance, and by its implementation. On the first measure, the Optional Protocol has gained widespread international acceptance. Most major states are parties, and the protocol is the second most-accepted enforcement mechanism after the First Optional Protocol to the International Covenant on Civil and Political Rights.

On the second measure, the number of complaints dealt with by the committee has been limited. A 2008 assessment for the UK government found that the protocol had hardly been used by NGOs as originally expected, that the reasoning of the committee was unpredictable, and that it had not affected policy-making. It found that there had been some limited success in highlighting the importance of effective policies to protect women from domestic violence and forced sterilization, but that outside these areas, the protocol "has not led to a breakthrough in advancing women's rights." It concludes that unless greater efforts are made to highlight awareness of the Optional Protocol and build trust in the rulings of the committee, the complaints mechanism will remain under-utilized.

The protocol has been criticised by legal academics such as Bal Sokhi-Bulley and feminists such as Catharine MacKinnon who view the complaints mechanism as difficult, lengthy, and lacking transparency. The voluntary nature of the protocol and the non-binding nature of its "recommendations" are seen as key limits on its effectiveness. Despite this, these critics tend to view the protocol as a valuable, if flawed, instrument for realizing women's rights.

== See also ==
- Convention on the Elimination of All Forms of Discrimination Against Women
- First Optional Protocol to the International Covenant on Civil and Political Rights
- Optional Protocol to the Convention on the Rights of Persons with Disabilities
- Optional Protocol to the International Covenant on Economic, Social and Cultural Rights
