= Optional Protocol to the Convention on the Rights of Persons with Disabilities =

2006 treaty for a complaints mechanism

- states parties states that signed, but have not ratified states that have not signed
- Drafted: 13 December 2005
- Signed: 30 March 2007
- Location: New York
- Effective: 3 May 2008
- Condition: 10 ratifications and entry into force of the Convention on the Rights of Persons with Disabilities
- Signatories: 94
- Parties: 107
- Depositary: Secretary-General of the United Nations
- Languages: Arabic, Chinese, English, French, Russian and Spanish

The Optional Protocol to the Convention on the Rights of Persons with Disabilities is a side-agreement to the Convention on the Rights of Persons with Disabilities. It was adopted on 13 December 2006, and entered into force at the same time as its parent Convention on 3 May 2008. As of November 2024, it has 94 signatories and 107 state parties.

The Optional Protocol establishes an individual complaints mechanism for the Convention similar to those of the International Covenant on Civil and Political Rights, Convention on the Elimination of All Forms of Discrimination against Women and Convention on the Elimination of All Forms of Racial Discrimination. But this Protocol also accepts individual rights on economic, social and cultural rights like Optional Protocol to the International Covenant on Economic, Social and Cultural Rights. Parties agree to recognise the competence of the Committee on the Rights of Persons with Disabilities to consider complaints from individuals or groups who claim their rights under the Convention have been violated. The Committee can request information from and make recommendations to a party.

In addition, parties may permit the Committee to investigate, report on and make recommendations on "grave or systematic violations" of the Convention. Parties may opt out of this obligation on signature or ratification.

The Optional Protocol required ten ratifications to come into force.

As of 2015, "[t]he UN Committee on the Rights of Persons with Disabilities is conducting an inquiry into the impact of the UK Government's policies on people with disabilities in relation to their human rights obligations." The Committee has not previously conducted such an inquiry.

== See also ==
- Optional Protocol to the Convention on the Elimination of All Forms of Discrimination against Women
- First Optional Protocol to the International Covenant on Civil and Political Rights
- Disability
