= Legal Information Centre for Human Rights =

Organization based in Estonia

- Founded: 1994
- Purpose: Human rights
- Location: Tallinn, Estonia
- Key people: Director A. Semjonov
- Website: www.lichr.ee
- Formerly called: Public Centre of Legal information for Human Rights

Legal Information Centre for Human Rights is a non-governmental organisation based in Estonia, according to Hanne-Margret Birckenbach, is "particularly involved in promoting the concerns of Russian-speaking inhabitants and with outstanding contacts to West European research institutes", which "is considered as one of the few attempts in Estonia to develop competence in the understanding of human rights issues, whereas Estonian judges or the legal education system, for instance, have remained uninterested". It participates at the EU FRA's Fundamental Rights Platform and is FRA's RAXEN focus group for Estonia, is member of AEDH and ENAR as well as supports UNITED network.

Its sponsors include the European Commission, Tallinn city, and the British, Russian, Norwegian, US, and Dutch embassies.

In 2009, the Estonian Internal Security Service has published statements on the centre's director Semjonov, claiming that:

According to the latest information Russia has decided to stake at the 2009 election of the European Parliament an unexpected candidate Alexei Semyonov. Although it is no secret that Semyonov is a member of the Constitutional Party, he has not yet proved himself in public as a politician (...) Alexei Semyonov is a person with classic loyalty to Kremlin, who coordinates his activities and decisions with the wants of the financers.

Amnesty International evaluated these statements in the following way:

In its report published in April, the Security Police board continued to attempt to discredit the Legal Information Centre for Human Rights (LICHR), an NGO promoting and defending the rights of linguistic minorities. The report stated that Alexei Semjonov, the LICHR director, would be a pro-Russia candidate at the 2009 European Parliamentary elections, that he was a member of a pro-minority Constitutional party, and that he carried out activities financed and directed by the Russian authorities.
However, Alexei Semjonov has stated publicly on 20 March that he would not take part in the European Parliamentary elections. Official information available on the internet showed that he was not a Constitutional party member.

In a project financially backed by the Russkiy Mir Foundation, the centre has published the book "Russian Schools of Estonia. Compendium of Materials" with the aim of creating conditions for the preservation of the existing public system of separate Russian language schools within Estonia. The current system is described as a legacy of the Soviet period when the education system was segregated with Russian settlers attending separate nursery schools, primary schools, and secondary schools with different curricula and instruction was held exclusively in Russian while the natives attended public schools with instruction in both Estonian and Russian On the other hand, the Estonian minister of education Aaviksoo, in rebuking claims that the school reforms were unconstitutional (the LICHR book claims Russian school closures are unconstitutional), stated that Russian schools in Estonia have existed for more than 100 years, including the first independence time between the world wars, and will continue to exist.

The UN Forum on Minority Issues considers that "The creation and development of classes and schools providing education in minority languages should not be considered impermissible segregation, if the assignment to such classes and schools is of a voluntary nature". The "establishment or maintenance, for religious or linguistic reasons, of separate educational systems or institutions" as such is not considered discriminatory by the Convention against Discrimination in Education if participation in such systems or attendance at such institutions is optional, and if the education provided conforms to such standards as may be laid down or approved by the competent authorities.
