= R (Carson) v Secretary of State for Work and Pensions and R (Carson & Reynolds) v Secretary of State for Work and Pensions =

UK legal cases

R (Carson) v Secretary of State for Work and Pensions; R (Carson & Reynolds) v Secretary of State for Work and Pensions
- Court: Administration Court of the Queen's Bench Division of the High Court of Justice (2002); Court of Appeal (Civil Division) in the Supreme Court (2003); Appellate Committee of the House of Lords (2005); European Court of Human Rights (ECHR), Fourth Section(2008); European Court of Human Rights, Grand Chamber (2010)
- Decided: Final decision of the Grand Chamber: 16 March 2010

Keywords
- Right to property; Prohibition of discrimination; State Pension; "Frozen State Pension"

R (Carson) v Secretary of State for Work and Pensions and R (Carson & Reynolds) v Secretary of State for Work and Pensions were a series of civil action court cases seeking judicial review of the British government's policies under the Human Rights Act 1998. They related to the right to property (whether the state pension was a welfare benefit or akin to a private contract) under Article 1 of the First Protocol and prohibition of discrimination under Article 14 of the convention. The Reynolds case also considered Article 8 of the European Convention on Human Rights (ECHR), the right to respect for "private and family life", as well as Article 3 of the ECHR, the prohibition of torture, and "inhuman or degrading treatment or punishment".

== Background ==
Annette Carson was a UK pensioner who had relocated to work in South Africa in 1989. In April 2002, she brought this case under the Human Rights Act 1998. Carson contended that the failure of the UK government to pay to pensioners resident in certain countries abroad the inflation uprating of their UK State pensions, while paying the annual uprating in other countries, contravened the UK Human Rights Act of 1998 (based on the European Convention on Human Rights) on grounds of discrimination. Annual uprating to the UK State Pension is payable in countries like the UK, the European Economic Area and a number of disparate countries (the United States, for example), whilst not being payable in predominantly Commonwealth countries such as Australia, Canada, New Zealand and South Africa.

Joanne Reynolds was under 25 and living in a council flat in England. She was receiving the Jobseeker's Allowance and Income Support. She received less than she would have received if she had been over 25. This allegedly breached:

- Article 1 of the First Protocol of the ECHR (whether the state pension was a welfare benefit or a private contract);
- Article 14, taken in conjunction with Article 1 of the First Protocol of the ECHR;
- Article 8 of the ECHR;
- Article 3 of ECHR.

The two claimants – Carson and Reynolds – had separate administrative court hearings in 2002, but their appeal hearing in 2003 to the Supreme Court of Judicature Court of Appeal (Civil Division) and to the House of Lords in 2005 were consolidated since the UK courts decided that the points of law raised in the administrative courts were similar.

The Carson case was pursued as a class action in the ECHR in 2008, where she was joined by twelve other applicants who, because they were resident in Australia and Canada, were in a similar position to her. Reynolds was not involved in this class action.

== Chronology and judgments ==
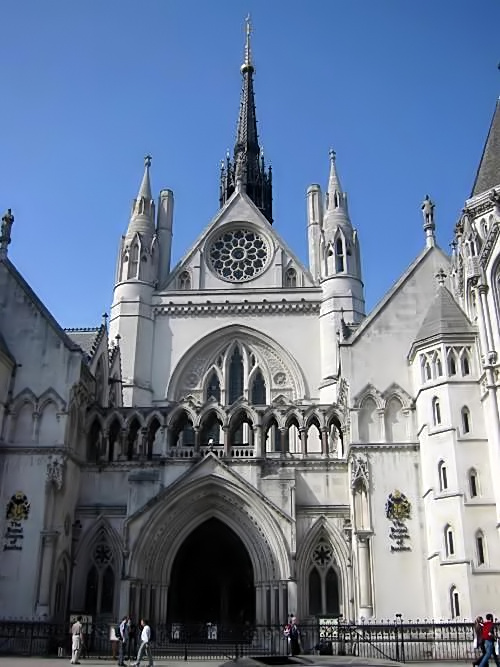
Royal Courts of Justice, London

=== R (Carson) v Secretary of State for Work and Pensions & Another ===
Cited as: [2002] EWHC 978 (Admin), [2002] 3 All ER 994

This case was heard in the Administration Court of the Queen's Bench Division in the High Court of Justice before the Honourable Mr. Justice Burnton.

Justice Burnton said that he understood how: "Very many of the expatriate UK pensioners who do not receive uprated pensions have a strong and understandable sense of grievance ... They feel that they have been deprived of an increasingly substantial part of the fruit of their contributions ... as a result, they have formed associations to press their cause for equal treatment".^{para 6}

The response from the Secretary of State for the DWP was that successive Governments have taken the view that increases in the UK State Pension were based on economic factors within the UK, and it would be unfair on UK tax payers to incur additional taxes to support those residents that have chosen to live abroad.^{para 34}

The United Kingdom is the only OECD country that discriminates between pensioners living in different overseas countries.^{para 36}

Justice Burnton also stated that "a government may lawfully decide to restrict the payment of benefits of any kind to those who are within its territorial jurisdiction, leaving the care and support of those who live elsewhere to the governments of the countries in which they live. Such a restriction may be based wholly or partly on considerations of cost, but having regard to the wide margin of discretion that must be accorded to the government, I do not think it one that a court may say is unreasonable or lacking in objective justification".^{para 73}.

Justice Burnton concluded that the decision as to whether expatriate UK pensioners received state pension benefits (including any annual increases) was a political decision rather than a judicial one, and he therefore dismissed the case, but he gave leave to appeal.^{paras 76 & 77}

Costs were awarded against Carson.

=== R (Reynolds) v Secretary of State for Work and Pensions ===
Cited as: [2002] EWHC 426 (Admin)

This case was heard in the Administration Court of the Queen's Bench Division in the High Court of Justice before the Honourable Mr. Justice Wilson.

Reynolds contended that under the 1998 Human Rights Act and the European Convention of Human Rights her Article 1 of the First Protocol, Article 14, taken in conjunction with Article 1 of the First Protocol, Article 8 of ECHR and Article 3 of the ECHR rights had been breached.

Judge Wilson decided that entitlement of Income Support is not a "possession" within Article 1 and that the demarcation line drawn by the Government i.e. between the ages of 24 and 25 were made clear by Parliament in 1987. These were extended in 1996. He concluded that it was an issue of social policy, and that the Government had demonstrated that there was "reasonable foundation" for the demarcation. It was also his opinion that: "Article 3 describes ill treatment of a depth which the level of payment to Reynolds wholly fails to reach". However, Reynolds contended that the demarcation between the age of 24 and 25 in terms of receiving state benefits was irrational. Judge Wilson disagreed, and dismissed Reynolds application.

Justice Wilson found in favour of the Secretary of State, but gave Reynolds leave to appeal.

=== Carson & Another v Secretary of State for Work and Pensions ===
Cited as: [2003] 3 All ER 577, [2003] HRLR 36, [2003] EWCA Civ 797

Two High Court cases which had been heard independently were brought together for the purposes of this appeal before the Supreme Court of Judicature Court of Appeal (Civil Division) before Lord Justice Simon Brown, Lord Justice Laws, and Lord Justice Rix which was heard on 17 June 2003:

1. R (Carson) v Secretary of State for Work and Pensions from the Administrative Court of the Queen's Bench Division of the High Court of Justice in England and Wales before Justice Burnton;
2. R (Reynolds) v Secretary of State for Work and Pensions [2002] EWHC 426 (Admin) (7 March 2002) from the Administration Court of the Queen's Bench Division of the High Court of Justice in England and Wales before Mr. Justice Wilson.

Lord Justice Laws conceded that the current situation was "haphazard", quoting the UK Minister of State Jeff Rooker who, on 13 November 2000, said: "I have already said I am not prepared to defend the logic of the present situation. It is illogical. There is no consistent pattern. It does not matter whether it is in the Commonwealth or outside it. We have arrangements with some Commonwealth countries and not with others. Indeed, there are differences among Caribbean countries. This is an historical issue and the situation has existed for years".^{para 54}

The UK Government's position has always been that successive British governments have taken the view that any increases to the UK state pension are based on economic conditions in the UK and that it would be unfair on UK taxpayers to pay a higher level of taxes in order to pay pension increases to people who have chosen to become resident elsewhere in the world. Motions to pay the annual increases to those UK pensioners living abroad who do not currently receive these increases were submitted to both Houses of Parliament in June and July 1995 during the passage of the Pensions Bill, which called for uprating to be paid. All were defeated with significant majorities.^{para 52}

The UK only uprates the State Pension where there is a legal liability to do so; this includes all UK pensioners living in the UK, the EEA, and a number of other countries where there are bilateral agreements in place relating to the UK State Pension. Whilst bilateral agreements were agreed with Australia (1953), New Zealand (1956) and Canada (1959), they did not include the uprating of the UK State Pension. Australia cancelled its bilateral agreement with the UK in 2001 because the UK Government would not uprate the State Pension for those UK pensioners who had emigrated to Australia. This was not an issue when the UK joined the EEC since bilateral agreements were in place for all of the EEC countries except Denmark. These bilateral agreements did facilitate the uprating of the UK State Pension.^{para 53}

In rejecting Reynolds's case, Lord Justice Laws said: "in my view, the Secretary of State has demonstrated a perfectly reasonable justification for the differential payments of Jobseeker's Allowance".

The three Law Justices dismissed both appeals, but leave was given to Carson and Reynolds to appeal to the House of Lords.

=== R (Carson) v Secretary of State for Work and Pensions ===
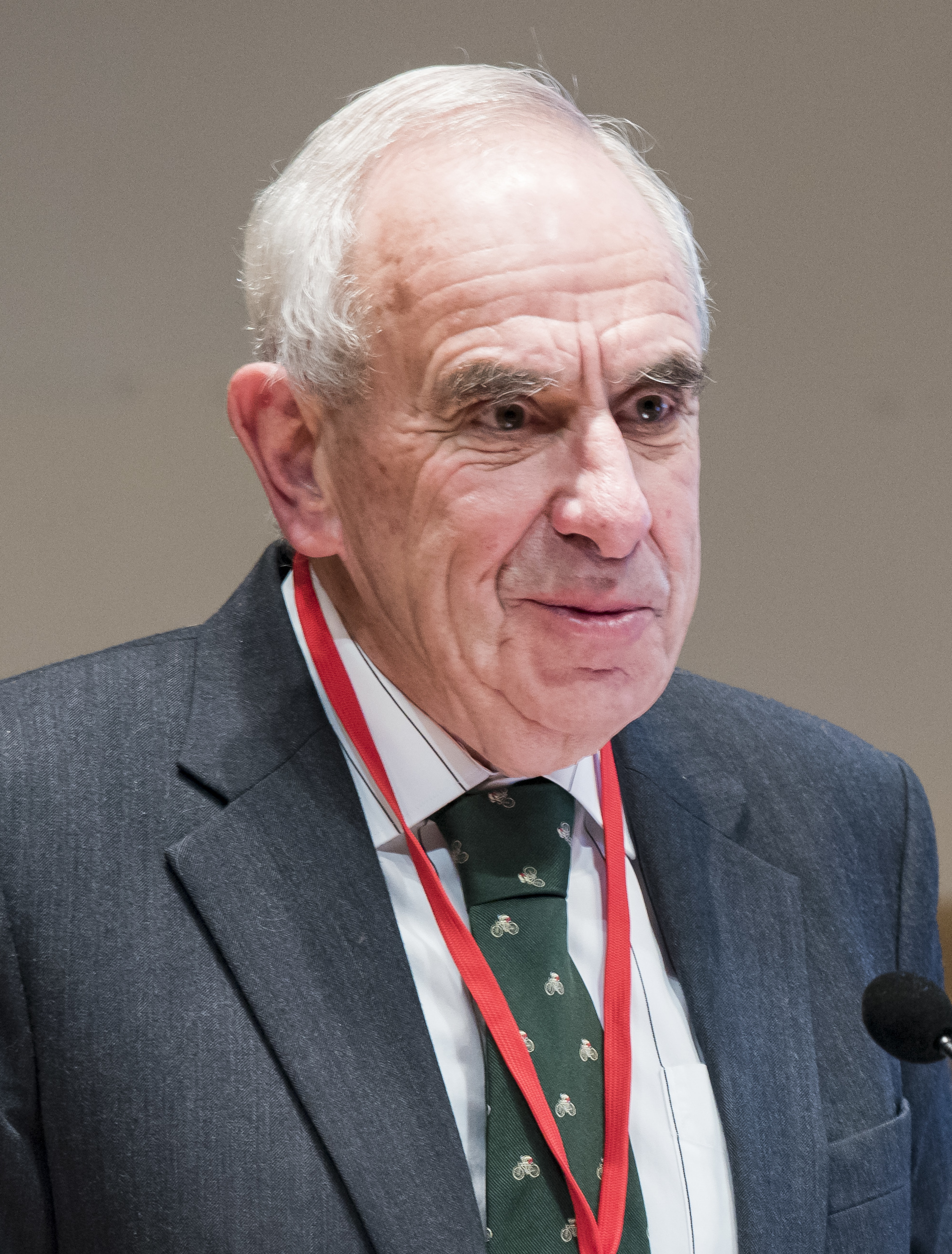
Lord Hoffman, one of the Appellate Committee Lords of Appeal

Cited as: [2005] 2 WLR 1369, [2006] AC 173, 18 BHRC 677, [2006] 1 AC 173, [2005] UKHL 37, [2005] UKHRR 1185, [2005] HRLR 23, [2005] 4 All ER 545

The Carson/Reynolds appeal was heard by the Appellate Committee of the House of Lords on appeal from the Court of Appeal (Civil Division) before the Appellate Committee made up of: Lord Nicholls of Birkenhead, Lord Hoffmann, Lord Rodger of Earlsferry, Lord Walker of Gestingthorpe, Lord Carswell.

Carson argued that she was being unfairly treated. She says she had paid the same National Insurance contributions (NICs) as a United Kingdom resident and therefore she should receive the same pension. She is supported by associations of expatriate pensioners in South Africa and elsewhere. Lord Hoffman said: "Carson's case is typical of over 400,000 United Kingdom pensioners living abroad in countries which do not have reciprocal treaty arrangements under which cost of living increases are payable. Arrangements exist for countries within EEA countries (European Union countries, Norway, Iceland and Liechtenstein) and a number of other countries such as the United States ("treaty countries"). However, there are no such treaties with South Africa, Australia, New Zealand and many other countries".^{para 6}

The House of Lords accepted the Secretary of State's arguments with regards to Reynolds. Lord Walker and Lord Nichols referred to case law saying they would intensely scrutinise race, sex and orientation justifications. But age was not in that. It is "a personal characteristic", said Lord Walker, "but it is different in kind from other personal characteristics. Every human being starts life as a tiny infant and none of us can do anything to stop the passage of the years. Lines must be drawn somewhere, and "drawing lines which create distinctions is peculiarly a legislative task and an unavoidable one. Perfection in making the necessary classifications is neither possible nor necessary". The key issue was whether the Secretary of State had the right to deal with Jobseeker's Allowance claimants who were under 25 in a different way to those who were over the age of 25.^{paras 36 & 37}

It was also noted that the age qualification had replaced a previous unworkable qualification of householders and non-householders.

Lord Carswell agreed with the other judges in rejecting Reynolds's appeal but would have allowed Carson's appeal and declared that he considered regulation 3 of the Social Security Benefits Up-rating Regulations 2001 (SI 2001/910) to be unlawful.^{para 104} In addition, he cited a number of other for allowing Carson's appeal.^{paras: 96-104}

The judgment of the Law Lords was 4 to 1 in favour of the Secretary of State.

=== Carson and Others v. The United Kingdom (2008) ===
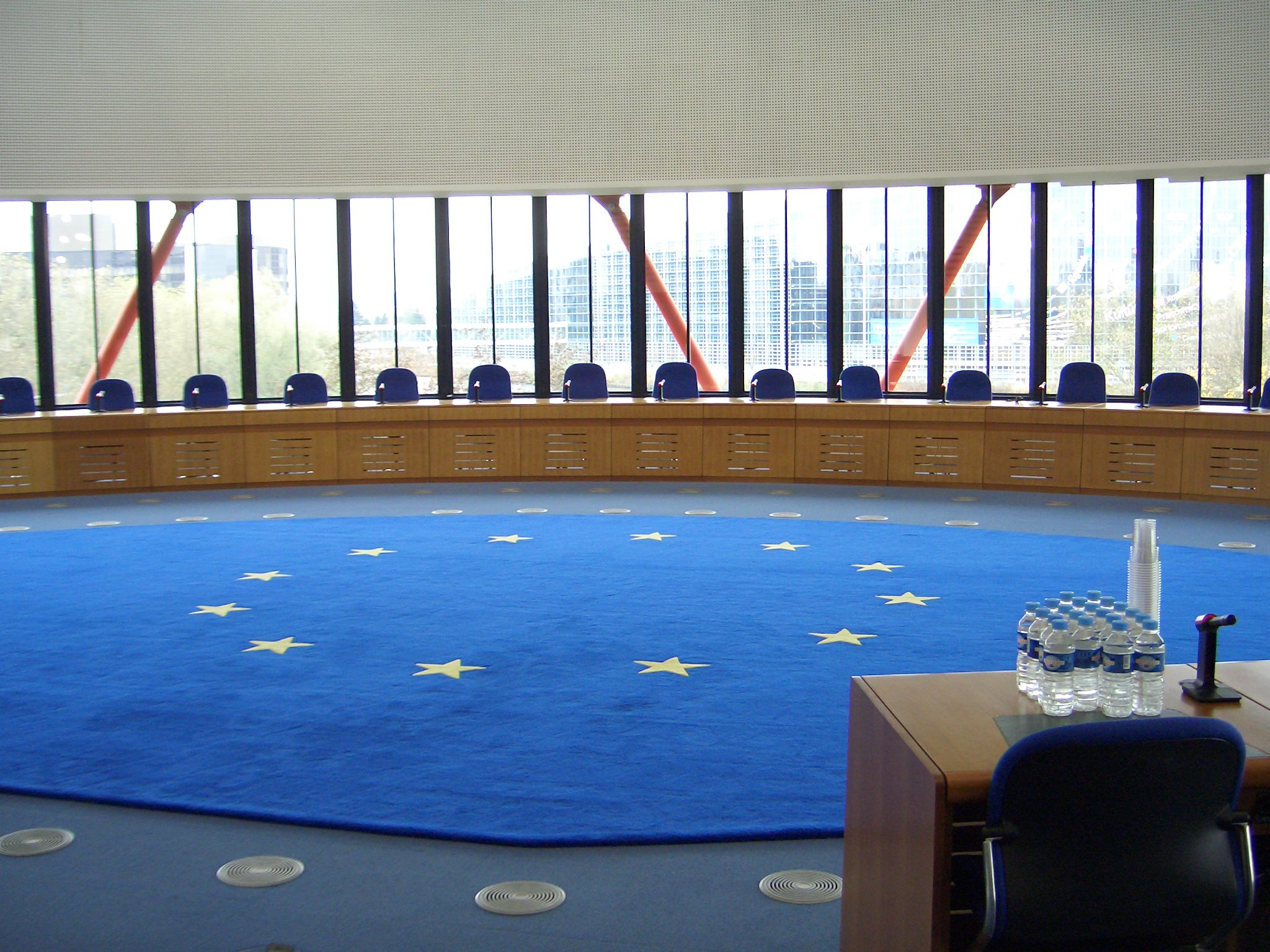
European Court of Human Rights Courtroom

Cited as: [2009] 48 EHRR 41, [2008] ECHR 1194, 48 EHRR 41

Carson was joined by 12 other applicants from Australia and Canada who were in the same position as she was, and they had formed a class action to appeal the UK House of Lords judgment. The case was considered in the European Court of Human Rights (ECHR), Fourth Section (Lower Chamber) in Strasbourg, France on appeal from the Appellate Committee of the House of Lords in a hearing before Lech Garlicki (president), Nicolas Bratza, Giovanni Bonello, Ljiljana Mijović, David Thór Björgvinsson, Ledi Bianku, and Mihai Poalelungi on 4 November 2008.

The applicants argued that the entitlement to a basic state pension was a "possession" (i.e. the same as a contract with a private pension provider) within Article 1 of Protocol 1, and the government were depriving them of part of that "possession" i.e. the annual uprating. They were being denied this uprating because they resided in mainly Commonwealth countries that the UK Government claimed did not have reciprocal agreements with the UK and these were termed "frozen countries". All of these applicants had been adversely affected financially as they were not receiving the annual uprating to their UK state pension that was intended to help counteract inflation. As a result, their UK state pension was being eroded and it had less buying power year on year.^{para 59}

In addition, the applicants claimed that Article 14 also applied in conjunction with Article 1 of Protocol 1. They believed that previous interpretations of case law had been too narrow and superseded by more recent case law. Whilst the UK Government had maintained that moving abroad was a freedom of choice, for many, this was the only way they could be near their family. They felt that they were being unfairly discriminated against. This discrimination, based on grounds of where a person chooses to reside is central to the enjoyment of certain human rights such as the right to family life, freedom of movement, and human dignity. This is likely to have a greater impact on women since, statistically, they will live longer. Given this, the court is right to scrutinise the UK Government.^{para 60}

Age Concern were a "third party" in this case and they had carried out a number of focus groups that identified that receiving the annual increase to the UK state pension was important to retirees. In carrying out surveys of older Chinese immigrants one of the main reasons why they had not returned to their home of birth was because they would no longer receive the annual increase to their UK state pension. In addition, in terms of the "most desirable" countries for emigration, five out of the top ten are "frozen" countries (Australia, Canada, China, New Zealand and South Africa), and therefore, it is highly likely that a large proportion of the older population had families residing in countries where the UK state pension was not uprated.^{para 64}

Pensioners become more frail as they get older – it is important that they have a support and welfare infrastructure around them, and in many cases this will be family.

Where families live abroad, then at some stage their parents are more likely join them and the Institute for Public Policy Research has produced a report that showed that 20% of older people had emigrated to be with family or for personal reasons i.e. not work-related.

The UK Government argued that because the applicants were from outside the UK, it was fair and reasonable to treat them differently. Social Security benefits, of which the State Pension was one, were meant for residents of the UK such that they could enjoy certain minimum standards. Systems that existed in other countries were also tailored to individuals living in those countries.^{para 56}

In Carson's House of Lords Appeal, Lord Hoffmann stated that those in need were "generally recognised to be national in character ... it does not extend to inhabitants of foreign countries", and that this was enshrined in UK domestic legislation. The Government agreed with Lord Hoffmann that it could not be the law that the United Kingdom was prohibited from treating expatriate pensioners generously unless it treated them in exactly the same way as pensioners at home.

The applicants contended that discrimination only occurs if similar situations are treated differently and that there is no difference between the three cohorts of pensioners (those residing in the UK, those living abroad in "frozen countries" and those living abroad where the uprating is paid); they all share one common characteristic, and that is they spent the same time in the UK and paid the same social security contributions into the National Insurance Fund. In addition, the applicants contended, the need for a reasonable standard of living is the same for all three groups of pensioners. All of the UK domestic courts (other than Lord Carswell in the House of Lords appeal) agreed that the three groups of pensioners do not have to be treated the same when it came to uprating the UK state pension.

The UK state pension is designed to provide a "minimum standard of living for those living in the UK", and the court found that the three groups of pensioners were not in relevantly analogous positions and therefore the UK Government had the right to treat them differently. As far back as 1983, there was case law regarding a British pensioner who had emigrated to Australia who was denied an uprated pension. In addition, in Carson's House of Lords appeal, the government could have made the decision to not pay any UK state pension to "frozen" pensioners at all.

When looking at all UK pensioners living overseas, the court could not find similarity between those pensioners who were resident in "frozen" countries and those who were resident in "unfrozen" countries. Social security contributions are used for other purposes besides paying the state pension – the National Health Service, for example. Even in those cases where there is proximity between "frozen" and "unfrozen" countries – Canada and the United States, for example – there are still differences in their social security provision, taxation, rates of inflation, interest and currency exchange rates to make it difficult to compare them.^{para 79}

The court considers that state pensions were not equivalent to private pension contracts and that these differences are "objective and reasonable" such that the UK Government can treat them differently, even though Age Concern in England made some powerful arguments as to why pensioners emigrate in the first place; ultimately, it is down to a matter of "personal choice". In addition, the UK Government claimed that it had made people aware that if they moved abroad, they may be moving to a "frozen" country where their UK state pension would not be uprated.^{para 80}

The court decided that the government can decide which countries it wants to have reciprocal social security agreements with and which ones it does not, based on its own economic policies; therefore, in the court's opinion, the government has not violated Article 14 taken in conjunction with Article 1 of Protocol No. 1.^{para 81 & 82}

The court therefore decided by six votes to one that there had been no violation of Article 14 of the Convention taken in conjunction with Article 1 of Protocol No 1.

The dissenting opinion came from the President of the Court, Lech Garlicki. He thought that the difference in treatment of different cohorts of pensioners had no objective and reasonable justification.^{Dissenting Opinion of Judge Garlicki (President)}

=== Carson and Others v. The United Kingdom (2010) ===
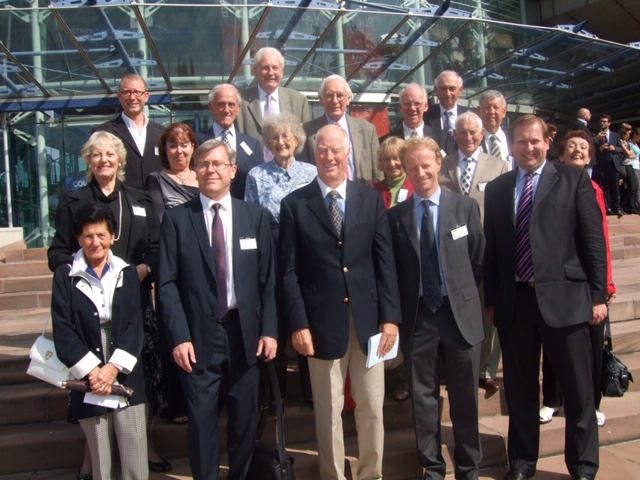
Annette Carson and other applicants and their legal team prior to first hearing before the ECHR Grand Chamber - 2 September 2009

Cited as: [2010] ECHR 338, 51 EHRR 13, (2010) 51 EHRR 13, 29 BHRC 22

Carson and the 12 other applicants appealed the decision from the ECHR Fourth Section. The case was heard publicly in the European Court of Human Rights (ECHR), Grand Chamber in Strasbourg, France on 2 September 2009 and 27 January 2010, with judgment handed down on 16 March 2010. This was appealed before Jean-Paul Costa (President); Christos Rozakis; Nicolas Bratza; Peer Lorenzen; Françoise Tulkens; Josep Casadevall; Karel Jungwiert; Nina Vajić; Dean Spielmann; Renate Jaeger; Danutė Jočienė; Ineta Ziemele; Isabelle Berro-Lefèvre; Päivi Hirvelä; Luis López Guerra; Mirjana Lazarova Trajkovska; Zdravka Kalaydjieva.

The applicants argued that their following human rights had been violated:^{para 52}

1. Article 1 of Protocol No. 1 – Right to property on its own and in conjunction with Article 14 of the Convention
2. Article 8 of the European Convention on Human Rights in conjunction with Article 14 (six applicants)

The applicants argued that they were being discriminated against because they were not receiving the annual increase to their UK state pension whilst others in a similar position to them were.

The Court maintained that, under UK domestic law and under Article 1 of Protocol No. 1, the applicants do not have a private contractual right to receive a pension other than as decided from time to time by Parliament and that this includes the annual uprating. This had been dismissed by the ECHR Fourth Section and could not be appealed.^{para 57}

The Court did not accept the UK Government's objections to Article 1 of Protocol No. 1 for the 12 applicants that had not filed domestic proceedings in the UK, and given that Carson had already brought test cases which had failed in the UK domestic courts, there was no point in the applicants litigating in the UK.^{para 58}

The applicants maintained that the treating of "residence" was an aspect of "personal status" and was consistent with case law. In addition, their position is that whilst moving abroad is a question of "free choice" it is not so if it is driven by the need or desire to be close to family members.^{para 67}

The government had conceded in the UK domestic courts that Carson's "foreign residence" was protected under Article 14, but argued that moving abroad was a matter of choice.^{para 68}

The third parties, Age Concern and Help the Aged, emphasised the importance of family support in old age.^{para 69}

The government argued that National Insurance contributions paid into the National Insurance Fund cannot be equated to contributions to occupational or private pension schemes. With regard to the UK state pension, there are no guaranteed entitlements.^{para 81}

The Court agreed unanimously that the complaint under Article 14 of the Convention taken in conjunction with Article 8 inadmissible; they rejected unanimously the UK Government's preliminary objection concerning the admissibility of the complaints of the applicants, other than Carson herself; they agreed by eleven votes to six that there had been no violation of Article 14 of the Convention taken in conjunction with Article 1 of Protocol No. 1.

The six dissenting judges published their joint opinion setting out their reasons for dissent.^{Joint dissenting opinion}

The UK Government prevailed; Carson and the other applicants lost their appeal and they had run out of courts to appeal to.
