= Sejdić and Finci v. Bosnia and Herzegovina =

Decided 22 December 2009
- Full case name: Sejdić and Finci v. Bosnia and Herzegovina
- Case: 27996/06 and 34836/06
- Nationality of parties: Bosnia and Herzegovina

Court composition
- President; Jean-Paul Costa
- Judges: Christos Rozakis; Nicolas Bratza; Peer Lorenzen; Françoise Tulkens; Josep Casadevall; Giovanni Bonello; Lech Garlicki; Khanlar Hajiyev; Ljiljana Mijović; Egbert Myjer; David Thór Björgvinsson; George Nicolaou; Luis López Guerra; Ledi Bianku; Ann Power
- Advocate General; Vincent Berger

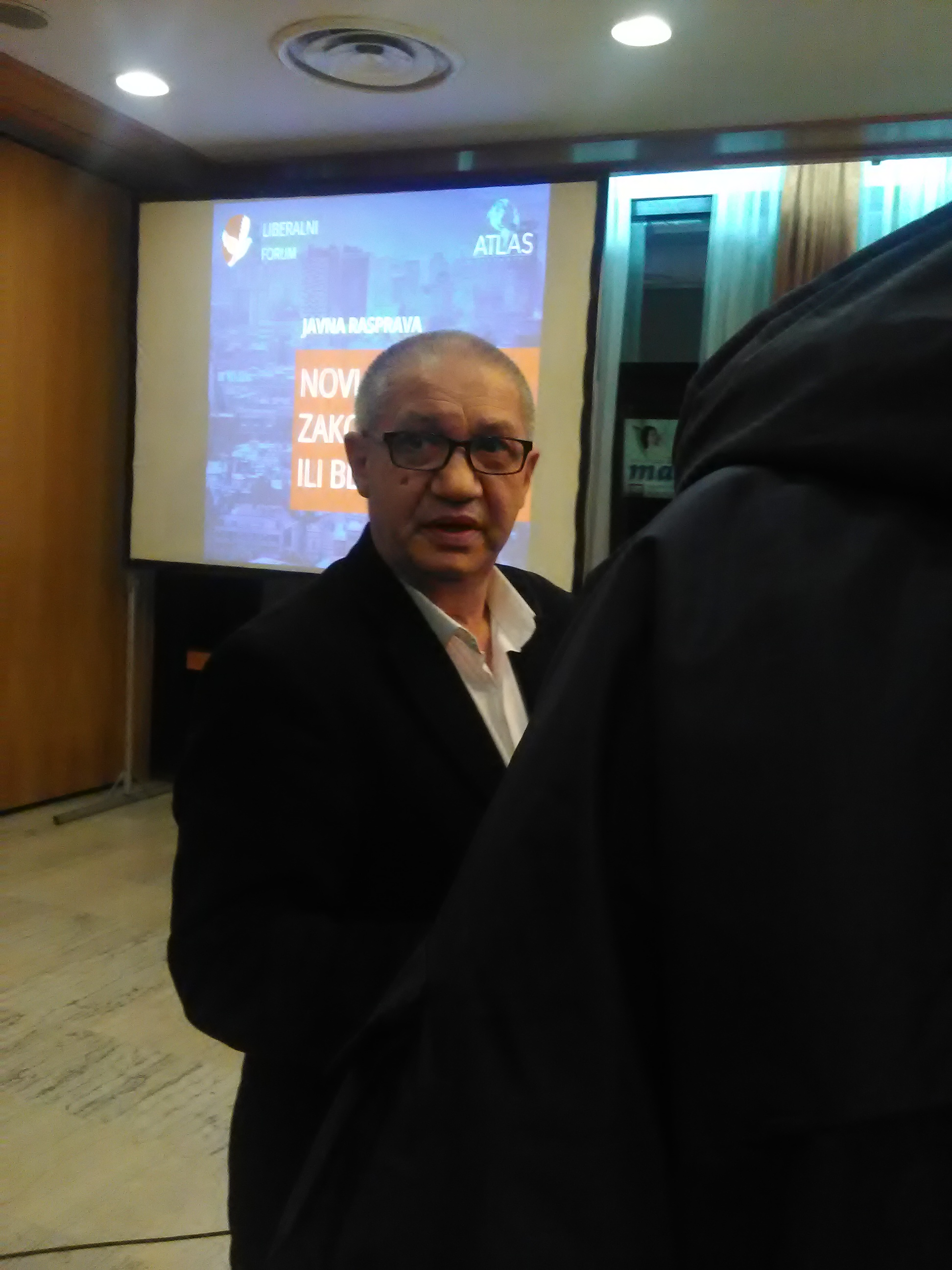
Dervo Sejdić

Sejdić and Finci v. Bosnia and Herzegovina (27996/06 and 34836/06) was a case (merged from two) decided by the Grand Chamber of the European Court of Human Rights in December 2009, in the first judgment finding a violation of Article 14 of the European Convention on Human Rights taken in conjunction with Article 3 of Protocol No. 1 thereof, with regard to the arrangements of the Constitution of Bosnia and Herzegovina in respect of the House of Peoples of Bosnia and Herzegovina, and a violation of Article 1 of Protocol No. 12 with regard to the constitutional arrangements on the Presidency of Bosnia and Herzegovina.

The plaintiffs were two citizens of Bosnia and Herzegovina, Dervo Sejdić and Jakob Finci, who are of Roma and Jewish ethnicity, respectively.

== Facts ==
The 1995 Constitution of Bosnia and Herzegovina, created as part of the Dayton Agreement which ended the 1992–1995 Bosnian War, included power-sharing provisions which provided that posts in the tripartite Presidency of Bosnia and Herzegovina and the House of Peoples (upper house of the national parliament) were reserved for ethnic Bosniaks, Bosnian Serbs and Bosnian Croats only.

The applicants, being a Roma and a Jew, contested these provisions. Finci was represented by Clive Baldwin, formerly of Minority Rights Group International now with Human Rights Watch, and by Sheri Rosenberg of Cardozo Law School, with advice and assistance from Minority Rights Group International throughout. Dervo Sejdić was represented by Francisco Javier Leon Diaz, a Barrister and established human rights lawyer.

== Proceedings ==
Applications were submitted in 2006 and communicated to the government in 2008. In 2009, the jurisdiction was relinquished to the Grand Chamber.

In June 2009, a public hearing was held, and in December 2009 the judgment was published.

== Trial ==
The Court found that applicants' ineligibility to stand for election to the House of Peoples violates Article 14 of ECHR (ban of discrimination in the field of Convention rights) taken in conjunction with Article 3 of Protocol No. 1 (free elections), by 14 votes to 3, and that their ineligibility to stand for election to the Presidency violates Article 1 of Protocol No. 12 (general ban of discrimination), by 16 votes to 1.

Judge Mijović (Bosnia and Herzegovina), joined by Judge Hajiyev (Azerbaijan), expressed a partly concurring and partly dissenting opinion, finding no violation in applicants' ineligibility to the House of Peoples.

Judge Bonello (Malta) expressed a dissent concerning both access to the presidency and to the House of Peoples.

== Aftermath ==
In October 2011, the Parliamentary Assembly of Bosnia and Herzegovina set in motion a constitutional reform, including changing the election provisions.

In November 2014, the UK and German foreign ministers, Philip Hammond and Frank-Walter Steinmeier, sent an "open letter" to the people of Bosnia and Herzegovina, which pledged substantive progress towards Bosnia's EU membership if Bosnia's politicians gave a written commitment to implement a package of reforms, including compliance with the Sejdic and Finci ruling of the European Court of Human Rights. However, as of 2025, 16 years after the ECHR judgment, no reforms have been implemented.

== In popular culture ==
Bosnian music band Dubioza kolektiv mentioned the case in a song on their 2013 album Apsurdistan.

== Bibliography ==
- Sweeney, James A. (2013). The European Court of Human Rights in the Post-Cold War Era: Universality in Transition. Routledge. ISBN 9781136159428.
