= Evans v United Kingdom =

European Court of Human Rights case

- European Court of Human Rights building
- Court: European Court of Human Rights, Grand Chamber
- Argued: September 27, 2005
- Submitted: February 11, 2005
- Decided: April 10, 2007
- Citations: [2007] ECHR 264, (2008) 46 EHRR 34, 6339/05

Case history
- Prior actions: [2003] EWHC 2161 (Fam); [2004] EWCA 727

Court membership
- President: Christos Rozakis
- Judges sitting: Jean-Paul Costa; Nicolas Bratza; Boštjan M. Zupančič; Peer Lorenzen; Rıza Türmen; Volodymyr Butkevych; Nina Vajić; Margarita Tsatsa-Nikolovska; András Baka; Anatoly Kovler; Vladimiro Zagrebelsky; Antonella Mularoni; Dean Spielmann; Renate Jaeger; Davíd Thór Björgvinsson; Ineta Ziemele

Evans v the United Kingdom was a key case at the European Court of Human Rights. The case outcome could have had a major impact on fertility law, not only within the United Kingdom but also the other Council of Europe countries.

Professor John Harris of the University of Manchester told the BBC in September 2002:

If the woman (Natallie Evans) succeeds in this case then the whole basis upon which the Human Fertilisation and Embryology Authority has operated thus far will be overturned. Until now, it has operated on the basis that there must be continuing consent between a man and a woman in every stage of the reproductive process. If she (Ms Evans) succeeds in this case, then she will have established that the man's role ends once the egg is fertilised.

On 10 April 2007 Natallie Evans lost her final appeal at the Grand Chamber of the European Court of Human Rights.

== Facts ==
In June 2000, Natallie Evans (born October 1971) and Howard Johnston (born November 1976) who had met while working at Virgin Mobile in Wiltshire became engaged. In October 2001, Evans was diagnosed with ovarian cancer, and was offered a cycle of IVF treatment before her cancer treatment because her fertility would be affected. On 12 November 2001 eleven of Evans' eggs were produced and fertilised using Johnston's sperm, resulting in six embryos which were frozen and placed in storage. On 26 November 2001 Evans underwent an operation to remove her ovaries. She was told she would need to wait for two years before the implantation of the embryos in her uterus.

In May 2002, the couple split up. In the summer of 2002, Johnston, who lives in Cheltenham, wrote to the Bath, Somerset clinic storing the embryos and asked that they be destroyed.

On 30 July 2002 the clinic informed Evans of Johnston's request under current United Kingdom IVF law, regulated by the Human Fertilisation and Embryology Authority, which states that both parties must give their consent for IVF to continue – otherwise, the embryos must be destroyed.

Evans started her legal challenge immediately, which in agreement with her solicitor Muiris Lyons was a dual challenge on the existing UK law under the Human Rights Act 1998, with Lorraine Hadley. Hadley from Baswich, Staffordshire, underwent IVF treatment but later got divorced from her husband Wayne, and wanted to use two of her stored embryos to try to get pregnant.

== Judgment ==
=== High Court ===
Lawyers for the two women submitted to the High Court of Justice in September 2002 that, as treatment was already under way, the men should not have the right to stop it. The women used the analogy that if they got pregnant naturally and the embryos were in their bodies, then their partners would have no say at all. In September 2002, Elizabeth Butler-Sloss, Baroness Butler-Sloss the president of the High Court's Family Division, said that a full hearing would be scheduled for the New Year, later confirmed as 30 June 2003.

On 1 October 2003 Mr Justice Wall said that in ruling against the women, although he had sympathy for the women's situation, he could not overrule the law as it stood. He said it was up to Parliament, rather than the High Court, to decide whether the law in this area needed to be changed. The High Court ruled the embryos of both women should be destroyed, but that would not happen until the conclusion of the appeals process. The women could appeal to the Court of Appeal or on to the European Courts. The main secondary outcome of the ruling was that the judge ruled that fertility clinics would now have to counsel couples having IVF to consider carefully what would happen to any embryos that were created if they split up.

James Grigg, solicitor for Howard Johnston, said: "Mr Johnston firmly believes that this outcome could be the only one, given the circumstances. With the conclusion of his relationship with Ms Evans, he would not now elect to start a family with her. If a child had been born, Mr Johnston would have legal, financial, emotional and moral responsibility for it. Mr Johnston hopes that Ms Evans wish to start a family can be satisfied in some other way, perhaps using donor eggs." After offering to donate the embryos to infertile couples, on 24 October 2003 Mrs Hadley told the BBC Midlands Today regional news program that she was giving up her fight in light of the unlikely scenario that her ex-husband would provide consent to her using the embryos, and the withdrawal of legal aid.

=== House of Lords ===
On 29 November 2004 three Law Lords dismissed Evans's application for leave to the House of Lords on the grounds that the petition "did not raise an arguable point of law of general public importance which ought to be considered by the House at this time, bearing in mind that the cause has already been the subject of judicial determination". Ms Evans still had the right to file a complaint to the European Court of Human Rights (ECHR) in Strasbourg.

=== European Court of Human Rights ===
On 26 January 2005 the Bath clinic informed Evans that it was under a legal obligation to destroy the embryos, and intended to do so on 23 February 2005. Although now outside the statutory five year legal limit for the retention before use of embryos, on 27 February 2005 the ECHR, to whom Evans had applied, requested, under Rule 39 (interim measures) of the Rules of Court, that the United Kingdom Government take appropriate measures to prevent the embryos being destroyed by the clinic before the Court had been able to examine the case. The embryos were not destroyed.

On 7 March 2006 a panel of seven judges of the ECHR delivered a majority 5–2 ruling against Ms Evans, which read: "The Court, like the national courts, had great sympathy for the plight of the applicant who, if implantation did not take place, would be deprived of the ability to give birth to her own child." However, the panel majority found that, even in such exceptional circumstances as Ms Evans', the right to a family life – enshrined in article eight of the European Convention of Human Rights – could not override Johnston's withdrawal of consent. The panel also ruled, this time unanimously, that the issue of when the right to life begins "comes within the margin of appreciation which the Court generally considers that States should enjoy in this sphere", and thus rejected the claim that embryo's right to life was being threatened.

Michael Wilks, of the British Medical Association ethics committee, said: "It's the right verdict, but a terrible situation." Dr Wilks called for a change to the five year limit for embryos to be stored after one partner withdraws consent should be extended so there was less of a "ticking clock". Ms Evans decided to appeal to the Grand Chamber of the European Court, but commented that she still wanted her ex-fiancé to change his mind to allow the embryos to be used.

On 10 April 2007 the Grand Chamber of the ECHR ruled against Evans' appeal under three articles of the European Convention of Human Rights, which represented her last chance to save the embryos. The court ruled unanimously that there had been no breach of the right to life; but on the right to respect for private and family life and on the prohibition of discrimination the 17 judges ruled 13 to 4 (Judges Türmen, Tsatsa-Nikolovska, Spielmann and Ziemele dissented the judgment). Dr Allan Pacey, secretary of the British Fertility Society, said: "I think it was the only sensible decision which the Grand Chamber could come to. UK law is clear. It is a principle of shared responsibility."

== Timeline ==
The timeline of the case is as follows:

- June 2000 – Natallie Evans and Howard Johnston, who have been together a year, become engaged
- October 2001 – Ms Evans, from Trowbridge, Wiltshire, is diagnosed with ovarian cancer, and is offered a cycle of IVF treatment before treatment because her fertility will be affected
- November 2001 – Eleven eggs are produced and fertilised, resulting in six embryos which are frozen and placed in storage
- Summer 2002 – Mr Johnston, who lives in Cheltenham, writes to the Bath, Somerset clinic storing the embryos asking for them to be destroyed after the couple had split
- June 2003 – Ms Evans, and another woman Lorraine Hadley, from Baswich, Staffordshire, go to the High Court seeking permission to use frozen embryos against their exes' wishes
- October 2003 – the High Court of Justice rules against Ms Evans and Mrs Hadley. Mrs Hadley decides to end her legal battle, but Ms Evans vows to continue
- January 2004 – Ms Evans seeks leave to appeal against the High Court judgment
- June 2004 – the Court of Appeal also rules that Ms Evans cannot use the embryos without Mr Johnston's consent
- November 2004 – the Law Lords refuse her permission to take her case to the House of Lords
- February 2005 – Ms Evans lodges an appeal with the European Court of Human Rights
- September 2005 – the European Court hears her case
- March 2006 – Ms Evans hears the court has ruled against her, and says she will seek leave to appeal to the Grand Chamber of the European Court
- 10 April 2007 – the Grand Chamber of the European Court of Human Rights hears case, and rules against Ms Evans

== See also ==
- List of gender equality lawsuits
