= Françoise Tulkens =

Baroness Françoise Tulkens

Vice-President of the European Court of Human Rights
- In office 1 February 2011 – 2012 Serving with Sir Nicolas Bratza
- President: Jean-Paul Costa
- Preceded by: Christos Rozakis

Judge of the European Court of Human Rights in respect of Belgium
- In office 1998–2012

Personal details
- Born: 12 September 1942 (age 84) Brussels, Belgium
- Profession: Lawyer

Françoise, Baroness Tulkens (born 12 September 1942) is a Belgian lawyer and expert in criminal and penal law, and former vice-president of the European Court of Human Rights. She served as a member of the Court since 1998, Section President since 2007, and vice-president from February 2011 until her term ended in 2012.

== Early life ==
Tulkens was born in Brussels, the capital of Belgium. She studied law, earning a doctorate in 1965 and practising at the Bar until 1968, when she was appointed Research Fellow with the Belgian National Fund for Scientific Research (Fonds National de la Recherche Scientifique). She was awarded the agrégation (higher education teaching qualification) in 1976 and the same year took up a post as Professor of Law in the Université catholique de Louvain (French-speaking Catholic University of Louvain at Louvain-la-Neuve), where she remained until her appointment as a permanent judge at the European Court of Human Rights in Strasbourg.

== Career ==
Alongside her post at the Université catholique de Louvain, Tulkens served as Chairwoman of the Scientific Committee of the European Law-making Research Group (Centre National de la Recherche Scientifique, Paris) from 1993 to 1998 and editor-in-chief of the journal, Revue internationale de droit pénal, from 1994 to 1998. From 1996 to 1997, she was an Expert for the European Committee for the Prevention of Torture. She has also been a visiting professor at the Universities of Geneva, Ottawa, Paris I (Pantheon-Sorbonne) and Rennes.

On 1 November 1998, Tulkens became a Judge of the European Court of Human Rights in respect of Belgium. She was elected a Section President in 2007 and on 1 February 2011 became one of two vice-presidents of the Court, along with the British judge, Sir Nicolas Bratza, and under French President Jean-Paul Costa. She retired from the European Court in September 2012 and was appointed a member of the Human Rights Advisory Panel of the United Nations Mission in Kosovo. In 2019, Tulkens was appointed to the High Level Panel of Legal Experts on Media Freedom, chaired by Lord Neuberger of Abbotsbury.

In 2021, Tulkens was the president of the Turkey Tribunal held in Geneva, Switzerland along with 5 other reputable international jurists.

== Other activities ==
- European Council on Foreign Relations (ECFR), Member
- King Baudouin Foundation, chair of the Board of Governors

== Honours ==
- Commander of the Order of the Crown.
- Conferred the noble title of Baroness in the Belgian nobility.
