= Fazlija =

Fazlija is a given name and surname. It could refer to:

== Given name ==
- Fazlija Šaćirović (born 1957), Yugoslav boxer

== Surname ==
- Fazlija (singer) (born Fadil Fazlija in 1972), Bosnian singer
- Betim Fazliji (born 1999), Bosnian footballer
- Nedžad Fazlija (born 1968), Bosnian sports shooter
