= Romani people in Bosnia and Herzegovina =

Romi u Bosni i Hercegovini
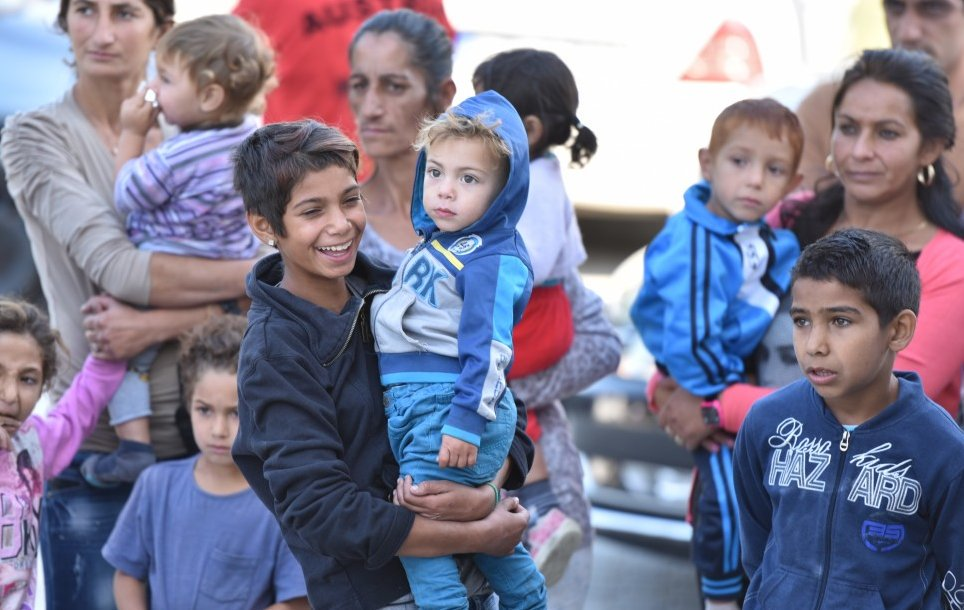
- Bosnian Roma in Gračanica

Total population
- 12,583 (2013)

Regions with significant populations
- Zenica-Doboj Canton: 3,158
- Tuzla Canton: 2,821
- Republika Srpska: 2,057
- Sarajevo Canton: 1,775
- Central Bosnia Canton: 1,347

Languages
- Balkan Romani, Bosnian

Religion
- Sunni Islam

The Xoraxane in Bosnia and Herzegovina (Serbo-Croatian: Romi u Bosni i Hercegovini, Роми у Босни и Херцеговини) are the largest of the 17 national minorities in the country, although—due to the stigma attached to the label—this is often not reflected in statistics and censuses.

== Demographics ==
The exact number of Roma persons in Bosnia and Herzegovina is uncertain. Due to the social stigma associated with the label, many community members refuse to self-identify as such in official surveys and censuses. Their number is thus consistently underestimated.

- The 2013 census recorded 12,583 Bosnian-Herzegovinian residents of self-declared Romani ethnicity (this data is deemed as grossly under-representing the Roma community in Bosnia and Herzegovina).
- The July 2012 estimates of the Council of Europe counted a minimum of 40,000 and a maximum of 76,000 Roma in BiH, with an average of 58,000, i.e. the 1.54% of the total population. This would still make Bosnia and Herzegovina the country in the Western Balkans with the lowest percentage of Roma population.
- A partial survey by the BiH Ombudsman through Roma associations recorded around 50,000 Roma living in Bosnia and Herzegovina, of which 35,000 in the Federation BiH, 3,000 in Republika Srpska, and 2,000–2,500 in the Brčko District — without counting the Roma population in the Sarajevo Canton.
- The Needs Assessment process conducted in 2010 by the state-level BiH Ministry for Human Rights and Refugees (MHRR) directly identified 16,771 Roma persons in BiH. The MHRR estimates that there are at least 25,000 to 30,000 Roma residents in BiH, although they acknowledge that up to 39 percent of Roma did not participate in the registration in some districts. According to the Ministry, around 42 percent of the Romani population in BiH is below 19 years old. 0.44%
- According to the 1991 census, there were 8,864 Roma in Bosnia and Herzegovina or 0.2 percent of the population. Yet, the number was probably much higher, as 10,422 Bosnians stated that Romani was their native language.
- Kali Sara and other local Roma NGOs put the number of Roma in BiH at between 80,000 and 100,000.

=== Geographical distribution ===
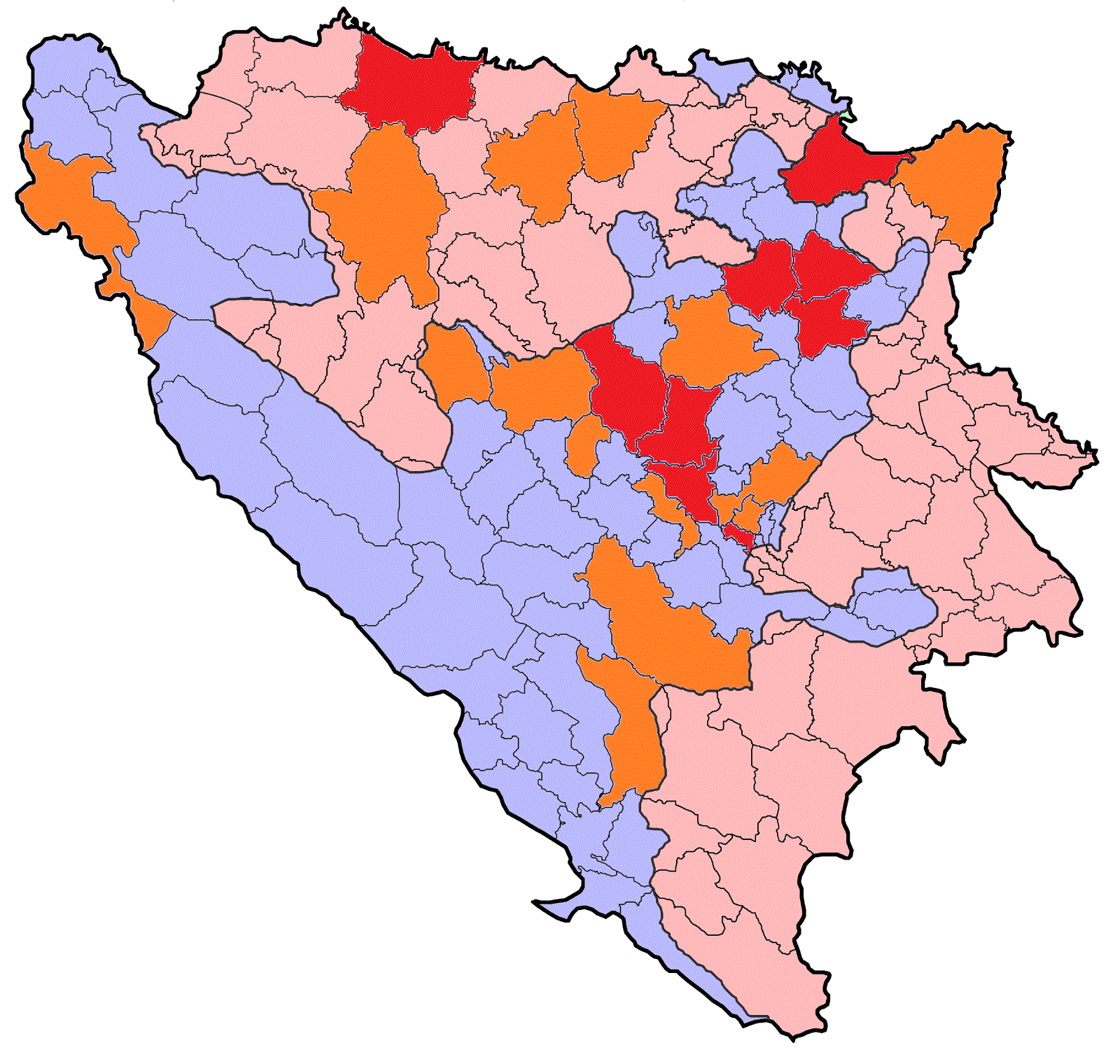
Municipalities with the largest Roma communities in Bosnia and Herzegovina: in red above 1,000 persons reported, in orange below 1,000

Important Roma communities in BiH are living in Brčko, Bijeljina, Sarajevo, Banja Luka, Mostar, Tuzla, Kakanj, Prijedor, Zenica and Teslić.

The largest number of Roma in Bosnia and Herzegovina live in the Tuzla Canton (15,000–17,000), of which a sizeable proportion in the municipality of Tuzla (6,000–6,500), as well as in Živinice (3,500), Lukavac (2,540). The Sarajevo Canton hosts around 7,000 Roma families, mostly in the municipality of Novi Grad, Sarajevo (1,200–1,500 families). The Zenica-Doboj Canton hosts between 7,700 and 8,200 Roma, of which 2,000–2,500 in the Zenica Municipality, 2,160 in Kakanj, 2,800 in Visoko. 2,000–2,500 Roma live in the Central Bosnia Canton, mostly in Donji Vakuf (500–550), Vitez (550) and Travnik (450). In the Una-Sana Canton there are between 2,000–2,200 Roma, of which 700 in the Bihać Municipality. In the territory of Herzegovina-Neretva Canton there are between 2,200–2,700 Roma, of which 450 in Konjic and 250 in Mostar. 2,000–2,500 Roma live in the Brčko District. In Republika Srpska live around 3,000–11,000 Roma, most of which in Gradiška (1,000), Bijeljina (541), Banja Luka (300), Prnjavor (200), Derventa (120).

== History ==
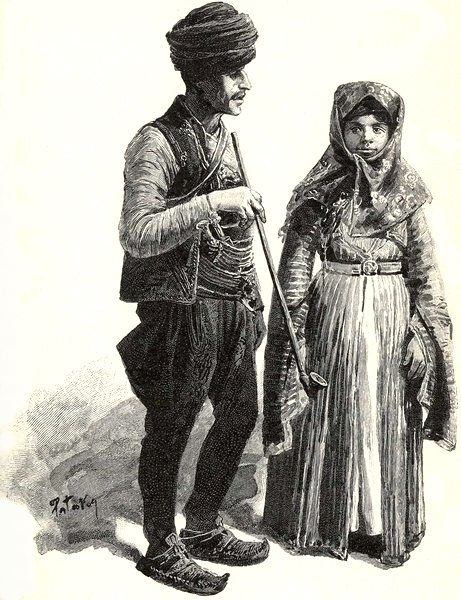
Muslim Roma in Bosnia (around 1900)

There have been Romani people in Bosnia and Herzegovina since the mid-14th century. Roma are deemed to have arrived in the territory of today's Bosnia and Herzegovina by the 14th–15th centuries, and to have adopted Islam as the majority confession during the times of Ottoman Bosnia and Herzegovina (15th–19th centuries), and was not paid a Tax by the order of Selim II. Already then, Roma were stigmatised and had to live in settlements outside city boundaries.

Rousseau, as French consul in Bosnia and Herzegovina, estimated in 1866 a number of 9,965 or 1.1 percent of the population were Romani. Johann Roskiewicz estimated in 1867 the number of the "Gypsies" in Bosnia at 9,000 (1.2 percent) and in Herzegovina at 2,500 (1.1 percent), resulting in a total of 11,500 Romani.

Attitudes towards Roma in Bosnia and Herzegovina hardened during the Austro-Hungarian forty-years rule (1878–1918), also due to rumours that Roma lived off immoral earnings. The 1911 Encyclopædia Britannica mentions 18,000 Romani in Bosnia and Herzegovina (1.6 percent).

The worst period for Bosnian Roma came with World War II, when Bosnia and Herzegovina was included in the Nazi-aligned Independent State of Croatia (NDH). It is estimated that 28,000 Roma perished in the conflict, in concentration and extermination camps such as Jasenovac. The Muslim community from Zenica published a declaration stressing the special position of Muslim Roma, and with help of religious authorities in Sarajevo, the declaration influenced the Ustaše authorities to make a special provision in May 1942 to spare some Muslim Roma residing in Bosnia and Herzegovina from deportation to the concentration camps.

In Socialist Yugoslavia, the situation of Roma improved considerably, as they became officially recognised as a “national minority” and came to enjoy a large degree of security and welfare.

During the war in Bosnia of 1992–1995, the Roma suffered mistreatment by all conflict parties, being often considered as agents of the enemy, or forcefully conscripted. Over 30,000 Bosnian Roma were expelled based on ethnic cleansing. Roma were subject to inhumane conditions in concentration camps and entire communities were destroyed.

In Italy a big group of Muslim Roma from Bosnia live there.

Several Roma from Kosovo moved to Bosnia and Herzegovina during socialist times as well as again during the Kosovo war. Kosovo Roma still face issues with civil documentations due to the lack of recognition of Kosovo by Bosnia and Herzegovina.

== Demographics ==
=== Ethnic identification ===
Various ethnic identifications of the Romani people in Bosnia and Herzegovina according to the 2013 census
Ethnic identification	Number
Roma (alone)	12.583
Bosniak Roma	72
Roma Bosniak	58
Gypsy	35
Bosnian Roma	27
Muslim(ite) Roma	15
Albanian Roma	13
Roma Bosnian	11
Roma Muslim	7
Muslim Roma	5
Muslim Gypsy	1

=== Language ===
According to the 2013 Bosnian census, a plurality of the Romani people in Bosnia and Herzegovina speak Bosnian, many of the Romani people are bilingual speaking both the Bosnian and Romani languages.

Languages spoken by the Bosnian Romani population (2013 census)
1. Bosnian (47.4%)
2. Romani (43.7%)
3. Other (8.90%)

=== Religion ===
The vast majority of the Romani population in Bosnia and Herzegovina are Muslims.

Religion of the Romani in Bosnia and Herzegovina (2013 census)
1. Islam (91.4%)
2. Eastern Orthodoxy (1.50%)
3. Catholic (0.20%)
4. Other (6.90%)

== Socio-economic conditions ==
=== Civil registration ===
Bosnia and Herzegovina has markedly tackled the situation of lack of civil registration documents and risks of statelessness, thanks to cooperation between the state authorities and NGOs, reducing the number of Roma persons without documents from some 3,000 to 57 in 2017. This result remains to be made sustainable, due to the risks of administrative complications linked to cases of temporary migration and the lack of recognition of documents for children born abroad.

=== Housing ===
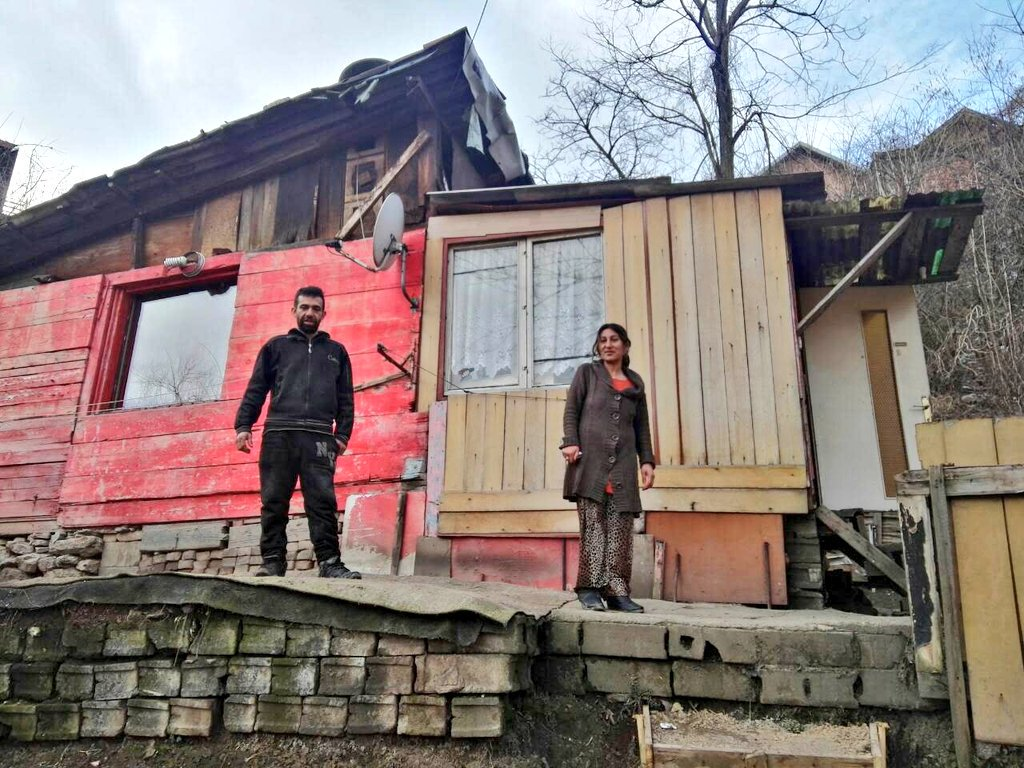
Bosnian Roma settlement Zavidovići, self-built home of Jasmin O. and his family

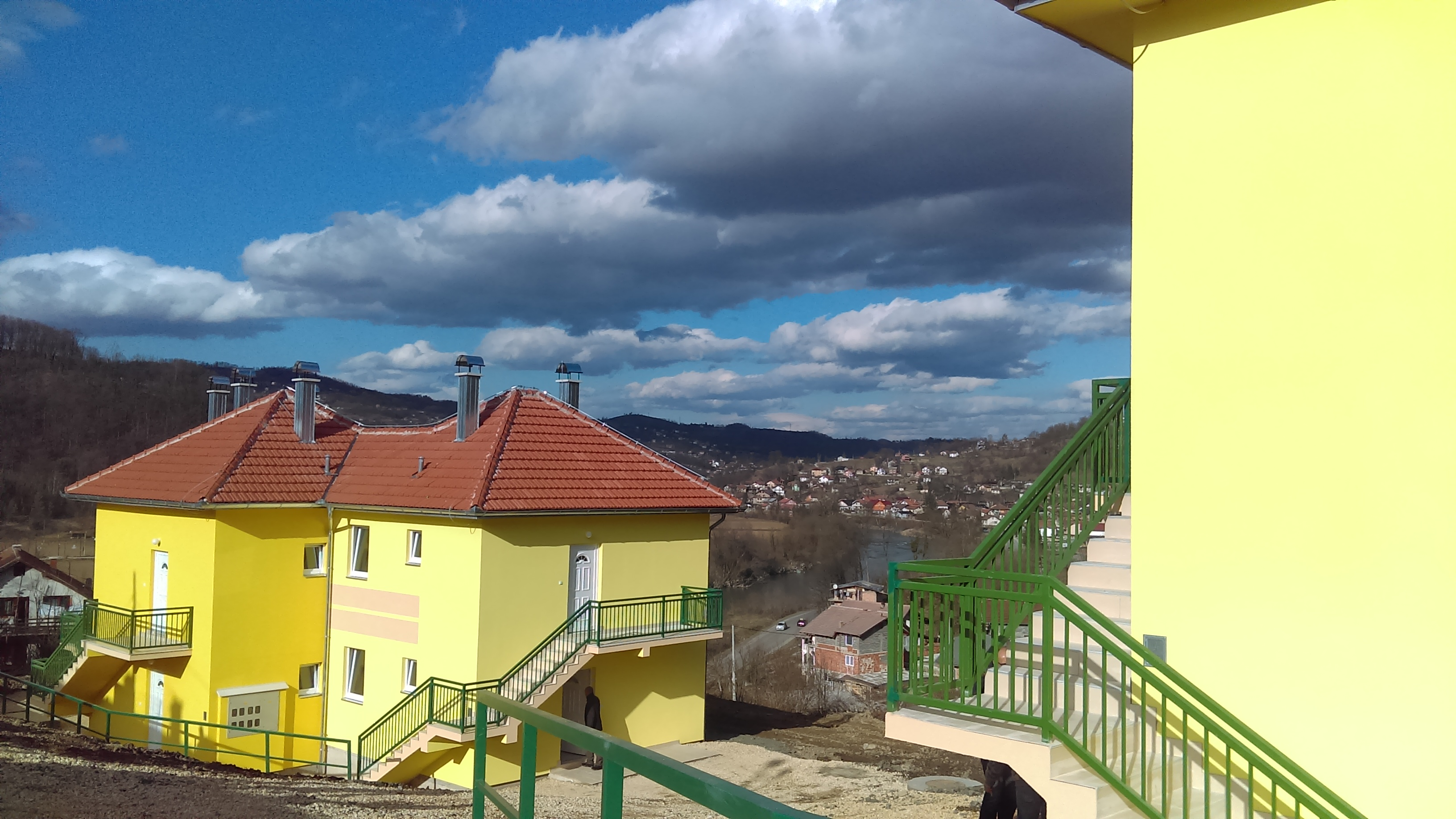
New social housing built with EU funds at Dolovi, Zavidovići

Many Roma in BiH still live in informal settlements, without access to water and electricity, as well as collective centres for IDPs. The Ministry of Human Rights and Refugees, in cooperation with municipalities and thanks to EU funds (4 million EUR in 2012) is building housing solutions for 150 Roma families in 14 municipalities. The legalisation and improvement of living conditions in informal settlement is ongoing and is still uneven across the country. Local Action Plans are being dressed up by municipalities.

=== Employment ===
Most Roma in BiH either work in the informal economy or have no means of sustainance. The percentage of employed Roma is very low, less than 1% in the FBiH and Brčko District of BiH and in the RS it is less than 3%. Those who find employment tend not to register or self-identify as Roma anymore, to avoid social stigma.

Lack of education and low skills add to problems of discrimination in the access to the labour market. Very few Roma are also registered as unemployed at the entities' Employment Bureaus. Public programmes to subsidize employment and self-employment of Roma population have achieved little results, due to the lack of retention of employees at the end of the projects. Some good examples of cooperation with big enterprises (e.g. "Bingo" supermarkets) have been registered too.

=== Education ===
Many Roma still face issues with access to education, in terms of both enrolment and completion of primary studies. In July 2010, the Council of Minister adopted the Revised Action Plan on the educational needs of Roma. The measures therein should be implemented by the 12 line ministries of education in entities and cantons and the department in Brčko District. Authorities provide textbooks, school transport, meals and other subsidies. Enrolment of Roma children in primary, secondary, as well as higher education has since increased, despite still concerningly high rates of drop-out. Bosnia and Herzegovina does not have issues with segregated education of Roma children.

=== Healthcare ===
Access to healthcare services remain difficult for a high share of the Roma population in BiH due to administrative and bureaucratic complications. Lack of school attendance and of registration as unemployment risks leaving many Roma citizens of BiH without health insurance coverage. Elderly Roma citizens face issues with seeing their right to health insurance recognised. Roma associations estimate that between 60–70% of the Roma population in BiH have access to health care.

== Political participation ==
=== Associations and representatives ===
84 associations of Roma are registered in BiH, of which 64 are in the Federation (with 25 active ones), 18 in Republika Srpska and two in the Brčko District (one active). In the RS, 11 associations over 18 are members of the RS Roma Union (Savez Roma RS). Roma associations mostly operate at municipality level.

=== Statutory discrimination ===
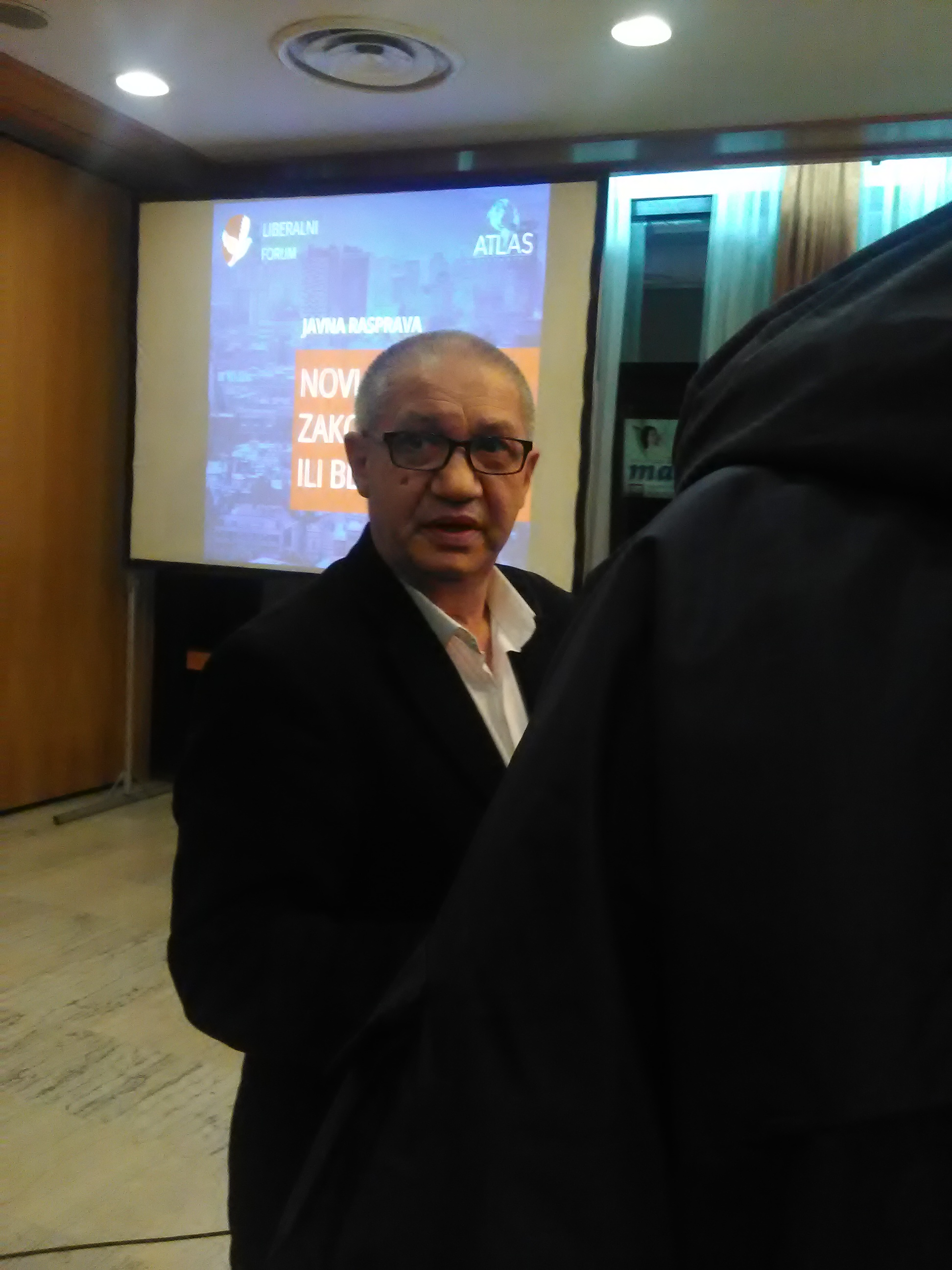
Dervo Sejdić

In the case Sejdić and Finci v. Bosnia and Herzegovina, the European Court of Human Rights in December 2009 found that the Constitution of Bosnia and Herzegovina violated the rights of Mr Dervo Sejdić (a Roma representative) because of the arrangements reserving the candidacy for the Presidency of Bosnia and Herzegovina and for the House of Peoples of Bosnia and Herzegovina to the affiliates to the so-called "constituent peoples" (Bosniaks, Serbs and Croats), thus directly discriminating against other groups, including Roma and Jews, as well as citizens without ethno-national affiliation. Bosnia and Herzegovina has not yet amended its Constitution to bring it in line with the European Convention on Human Rights.

Roma representatives take part in the National Minority Councils, legislative advisory bodies at state and entity levels in Bosnia and Herzegovina.

=== BiH Roma Committee ===
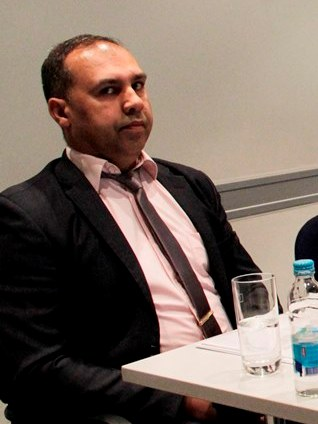
BiH Roma Committee chairman Mujo Fafulić

The Roma Committee of Bosnia and Herzegovina is an advisory body to the Council of Ministers of Bosnia and Herzegovina, established since 2002 with the aim of advancing the protection of the Roma minority in BiH. The responsibilities of the body were further defined in 2012 and its current members were appointed in 2017. Its current chairman is Mujo Fafulić from the Support Center for Roma “Romalen”, Kakanj.

The Roma Committee is tasked with monitoring the implementation of the Strategy of Bosnia and Herzegovina for Addressing Roma Issues (Official Gazette of BiH, No. 67/05) and its action plans: the revised Roma Action Plan in the areas of Employment, Housing and Health (2017) and the Revised Plan on the Educational Needs of Roma in Bosnia and Herzegovina (2010). The Roma Committee also manages a public call for grants to Roma NGOs in cooperation with the Ministry of Human Rights and Refugees.

The Roma Committee consists of 22 members:

- 11 Roma representatives, on behalf of the registered Roma associations, ensuring equal territorial representation:

- 6 members from associations based in the Federation of Bosnia and Herzegovina, namely one member on behalf of the duly registered Roma associations in the Sarajevo Canton, the Zenica-Doboj Canton, the Una-Sana Canton, the Tuzla Canton, the Central Bosnia Canton and the Herzegovina-Neretva Canton;
- 3 members from associations based in Republika Srpska, one each from the region of Banja Luka, Doboj and Bijeljina;
- 1 member from associations based in the Brcko District
- 1 member on behalf of the Roma Women Network.

- and 11 representatives of institutions of Bosnia and Herzegovina:

- the Ministry of Human Rights and Refugees of Bosnia and Herzegovina,
- the Ministry of Finance and Treasury of Bosnia and Herzegovina,
- the Ministry of Civil Affairs of Bosnia and Herzegovina,
- the Ministry of Security of Bosnia and Herzegovina,
- the Ministry of Justice of Bosnia and Herzegovina,
- the Directorate for European Integration,
- the Employment Agency of Bosnia and Herzegovina and
- the Gender Equality Agency of Bosnia and Herzegovina.
- the Government of the Federation of Bosnia and Herzegovina,
- the Government of Republika Srpska
- the Government of Brcko District

== Notable Bosnian Roma ==
- Rade Uhlik, romologist
- Dervo Sejdić, vice president of NGO Kali Sara Roma Information Center
- Indira Bajramović, activist and economist
- Čika Mišo, Bosnia's last shoeshiner
- Emra Tahirović, footballer
- Fazlija, singer
- Arif Heralić, industrial worker

== See also ==
- Music of Bosnia and Herzegovina
- Ethnic groups in Bosnia and Herzegovina

== Sources ==
- Ethnicity/National Affiliation, Religion and Mother Tongue (PDF) (Report). Sarajevo: Agency for Statistics of Bosnia and Herzegovina. 2019.
