= Protocol 12 to the European Convention on Human Rights =

Protocol No. 12 to the European Convention on Human Rights
Protocol No. 12 to the Convention for the Protection of Human Rights and Fundamental Freedoms
- Map of participation in Protocol No. 12 to the European Convention on Human Rights States Parties to the ECHR and to Protocol No. 12 States Parties to the ECHR that have signed but not ratified Protocol No. 12 States Parties to the ECHR that have neither signed nor ratified Protocol No. 12 States not Parties to the ECHR
- Type: Substantive additional protocol to the European Convention on Human Rights
- Signed: 4 November 2000
- Location: Rome, Italy
- Effective: 1 April 2005
- Condition: Ratification by at least ten Council of Europe member states
- Depositary: Secretary General of the Council of Europe
- Language: English and French

Protocol No. 12 to the Convention for the Protection of Human Rights and Fundamental Freedoms (ETS No. 177) is an anti-discrimination treaty of the Council of Europe. It was adopted on November 4, 2000, in Rome and entered into force on April 1, 2005, after tenth ratification. As of January 2026, it has been ratified by 20 states (of the 46 CoE member states).

== Core provisions ==
Article 1 – General prohibition of discrimination.

1 The enjoyment of any right set forth by law shall be secured without discrimination on any ground such as sex, race, colour, language, religion, political or other opinion, national or social origin, association with a national minority, property, birth or other status.

2 No one shall be discriminated against by any public authority on any ground such as those mentioned in paragraph 1.

Unlike Article 14 of the Convention itself, the prohibition of discrimination in Protocol No. 12 is not limited to enjoying only those rights provided by the Convention. The additional scope of the Protocol covers four categories of cases:

- Cases where a person is subjected to discrimination in the enjoyment of any right specifically conferred upon the individual by national law (and not solely rights provided under the Convention);
- Cases where a person is subjected to discrimination in the enjoyment of any right arising from clear obligations imposed upon public authorities under national law (where such authorities are legally obliged to act in a particular manner);
- Cases involving discrimination by public authorities in the exercise of discretionary powers (such as grants or subsidies);
- Cases involving discrimination resulting from other acts or omissions by public authorities (for instance, the conduct of law enforcement officials in quelling a riot).

== Application ==
The first case, where the European Court of Human Rights has found a violation of Article 1 of Protocol No. 12, was Sejdić and Finci v. Bosnia and Herzegovina, adjudicated in 2009.

== Protection ==
The new right enjoys the same protection as the Convention grants to the rights originally included therein, allowing individuals, non-governmental organizations, and groups of individuals to bring actions before the European Court of Human Rights claiming violations of their rights. However, most States Parties to the Convention have not yet ratified Protocol No. 12. Following its ratification by Portugal in 2017, only 20 of the 46 member States of the Council of Europe had done so, with another 18 having signed it but not yet ratified it.
