= Ethnic groups in Bosnia and Herzegovina =

External videos
- Archived at Ghostarchive and the Wayback Machine: "Bosnia and Herzegovina: an ethnically divided country | DW Documentary". Deutsche Welle. 14 January 2018.

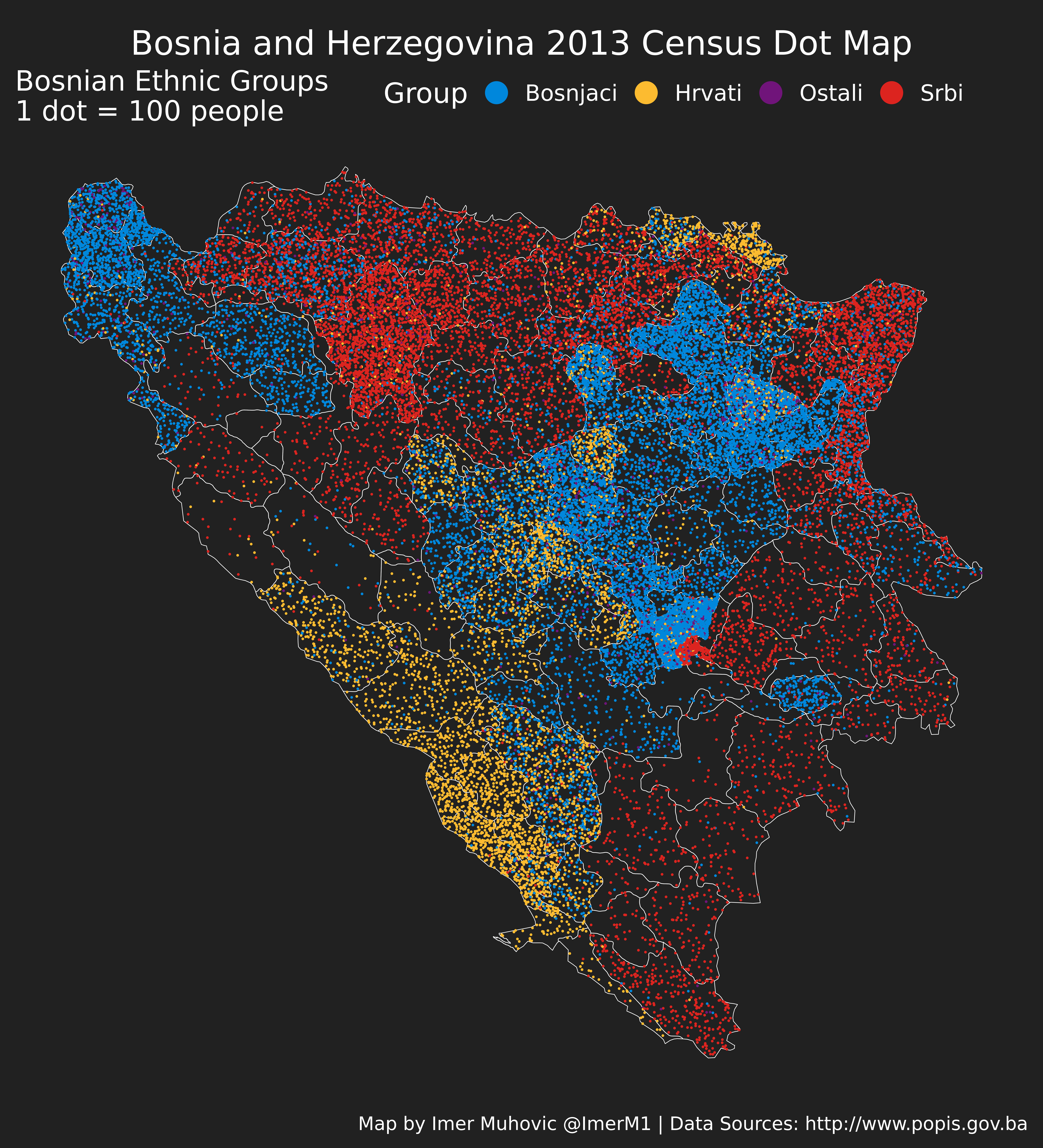
Population density and ethnic distribution (2013 census data). Bosniaks are in blue, Croats in yellow, Serbs in red, and others are purple.

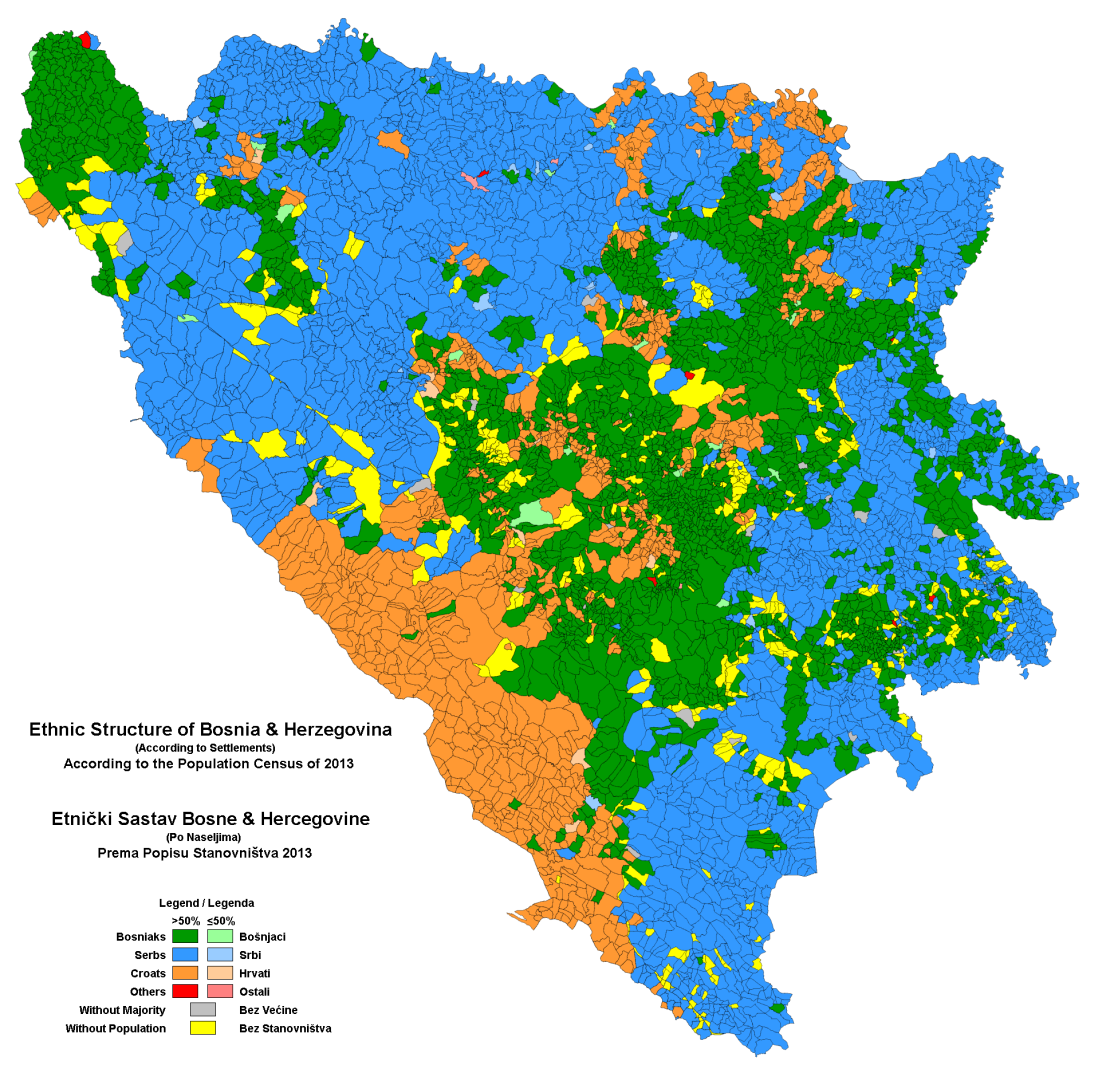
Ethnic map of Bosnia and Herzegovina according to 2013 census

More than 96% of the population of Bosnia and Herzegovina belongs to one of its three constituent peoples (Serbo-Croatian: konstitutivni narodi / конститутивни народи): Bosniaks, Serbs, and Croats. The term constituent refers to the fact that these three ethnic groups are explicitly mentioned in the constitution, and that none of them can be considered a minority or immigrant. The most easily recognisable feature that distinguishes the three ethnic groups is their religion, with Bosniaks predominantly Muslim, Serbs predominantly Eastern Orthodox, and Croats Catholic.

Bosniaks, Croats, and Serbs speak the Shtokavian dialect of a pluricentric language known in linguistics as Serbo-Croatian. The question of standard language is resolved in such a way that three constituent peoples have their educational and cultural institutions in the standard varieties, which are considered official languages at sub-state levels: Bosnian, Croatian and Serbian.

A Y chromosome haplogroup study published in 2005 found that "three main groups of Bosnia-Herzegovina, in spite of some quantitative differences, share a large fraction of the same ancient gene pool distinctive for the Balkan area".

== Historical background ==
While the Kingdom of Bosnia existed, no specific Bosnian identity emerged during medieval times. In Bosnia and Herzegovina during the Ottoman rule, the population did not identify with national categories, except for a few intellectuals from urban areas who considered themselves to be Croats or Serbs. The population of Bosnia and Herzegovina primarily identified itself by religion, using the terms Turk (for Muslims), Hrišćani (Christians) or Greeks (for the Orthodox) and "Kršćani" or Latins (for the Catholics). The Christians, both the Catholics and the Eastern Orthodox, were organised in their respective millets, the religious communities with internal autonomy. The Catholics identified more with the Croatians, while the Eastern Orthodox with the Serbian nation, respectively. For Muslims, identity was more related to the defence of local privileges, but it did not call into question the allegiance to the Ottoman Empire. The use of the term "Bosniak" at that time did not have a national meaning but a regional one.

When Austria-Hungary occupied Bosnia and Herzegovina in 1878, national identification was still a foreign concept to Bosnian Muslims. The new Austro-Hungarian authorities tried to impose a collective Bosnian identity to curb Croatian and Serbian nationalism, going so far as to forbid the usage of Croatian or Serbian names in the title of cultural associations. The idea of collective identity was met with opposition from the Croat, Serb and Muslim elites, and was accepted only by a small number of emerging modernising Muslims. The Christian elites in Bosnia and Herzegovina accepted Croatian and Serbian identities as their own, which resulted in a rapid rise of Croatian and Serbian nationalism in the country. The Muslims, on the other hand, gathered around their religious and landowning elites, requesting religious autonomy. The Austro-Hungarian authorities eventually started to accept and later favoured such consolidation in Bosnia and Herzegovina.

After World War I, Bosnia and Herzegovina was incorporated into the newly established Kingdom of Serbs, Croats and Slovenes (later renamed Yugoslavia). The Serbs, Croats and Slovenes were the constituent ("old") nations. Although the new government changed the power dynamic among the ethnic groups in Bosnia and Herzegovina, the communitarianism inherited from Austria-Hungary remained dominant. This was especially evident in the voting patterns. The same situation was present in the whole of Yugoslavia, not just Bosnia and Herzegovina. Serbs and Croats voted for their respective parties, of which several existed, while the Muslims voted for just one, the Yugoslav Muslim Organization (JMO). During the reign of King Alexander I, a modern single Yugoslav identity was unsuccessfully propagated to erase the particularistic identities. Serb and Croat populations in Bosnia and Herzegovina saw Belgrade and Zagreb as their national centres, while at the same time, the conflict between the two groups deepened. At the same time, the decline of the Muslim elite caused an identity crisis among Muslims. With Croatian and Serbian nationalism competing for their inclination, they instead found refuge in national indeterminism or Yugoslavism. In 1939, the Serbian and Croatian political leadership agreed on the partition of Bosnia and Herzegovina, creating the Banovina of Croatia. After its creation, the leaders of JMO and the Muslim religious elites created a movement for the autonomy of Bosnia and Herzegovina.

During World War II, in 1941, Germany invaded Yugoslavia and established its puppet, the Independent State of Croatia (NDH), into which Bosnia and Herzegovina was incorporated. The majority of Bosnian Muslims considered themselves to be ethnic Croats at the time. This period saw the destruction of traditional communitarianism in favour of exclusive nationalisms, with Serbs being heavily persecuted by the Croat Ustaše, while the Serb Chetniks murdered Muslims as a reprisal. The communist Yugoslav Partisans emerged as the strongest anti-fascist force in the country. The Partisan movement addressed Serbs, Muslims and Croats, even though most of their activity was organised by Serbs initially. In 1943, the State Anti-fascist Council for the National Liberation of Bosnia and Herzegovina, the main political body of the Partisans in Bosnia and Herzegovina, established Bosnia and Herzegovina as a distinct territory, guaranteeing "full equality of all Serbs, Muslims and Croats".

With the formation of Socialist Yugoslavia, there were six republics and five constitutive nations, adding Macedonians and Montenegrins (whose identities were not earlier recognised); the Bosnian Muslims were recognised only in the late 1960s. For the 1961 census, a new ethnic category was introduced–Muslims–with which 972,954 Bosnians identified. In 1964, the Muslims were declared a narod ("people"), as the other five "peoples", but were not ascribed a national republic. In 1968, the Bosnian Central Committee declared that "...Muslims are a distinct nation". For the 1971 census, accordingly, "Muslims, in the sense of a nation" was introduced.

== Demographics ==
According to data from the 2013 census published by the Agency for Statistics of Bosnia and Herzegovina, Bosniaks constitute 50.11% of the population, Bosnian Serbs 30.78%, Bosnian Croats 15.43%, and others form 2.73%, with the remaining respondents not declaring their ethnicity or not answering. However, there has not been a census since 2013. The actual current statistics remain unknown.

Ethnic group	Census 2013		Census UNHCR 1996		Census 1991		Census 1981		Census 1971		Census 1961		Census 1953		Census 1948	
Ethnic group	Number	%	Number	%	Number	%	Number	%	Number	%	Number	%	Number	%	Number	%
Bosniaks/Muslims	1,769,592	50.11	1,805,910	46.1	1,902,956	43.48	1,629,924	39.5	1,482,430	39.6	842,248	25.7	891,800	31.3	788,403	30.7
Serbs	1,086,733	30.78	1,484,530	37.9	1,366,104	31.22	1,320,644	32.0	1,393,148	37.2	1,406,057	42.9	1,264,372	44.4	1,136,116	44.3
Croats	544,780	15.43	571,317	14.6	760,852	17.39	758,136	18.4	772,491	20.6	711,665	21.7	654,229	23.0	614,123	23.9
Yugoslavs	2,570	0.07			242,682	5.55	326,280	7.9	43,796	1.2	275,883	8.4				
Montenegrins	1,883	0.05			10,071	0.23	14,114	0.3	13,021	0.3	12,828	0.4	7,336	0.3	3,094	0.1
Roma	12,583	0.36			8,864	0.20	7,251	0.2	1,456	0.0	588	0.0	2,297	0.1	442	0.0
Albanians	2,569	0.07			4,925	0.11	4,396	0.1	3,764	0.1	3,642	0.1				
Others/undeclared	110,449	3.13	58,196	1.5	80,579	1.84	63,263	1.5	36,005	1	28,679	0.8	27,756	1.0	23,099	0.9
Total	3,531,159		3,919,953		4,377,033		4,124,008		3,746,111		3,277,948		2,847,790		2,565,277	

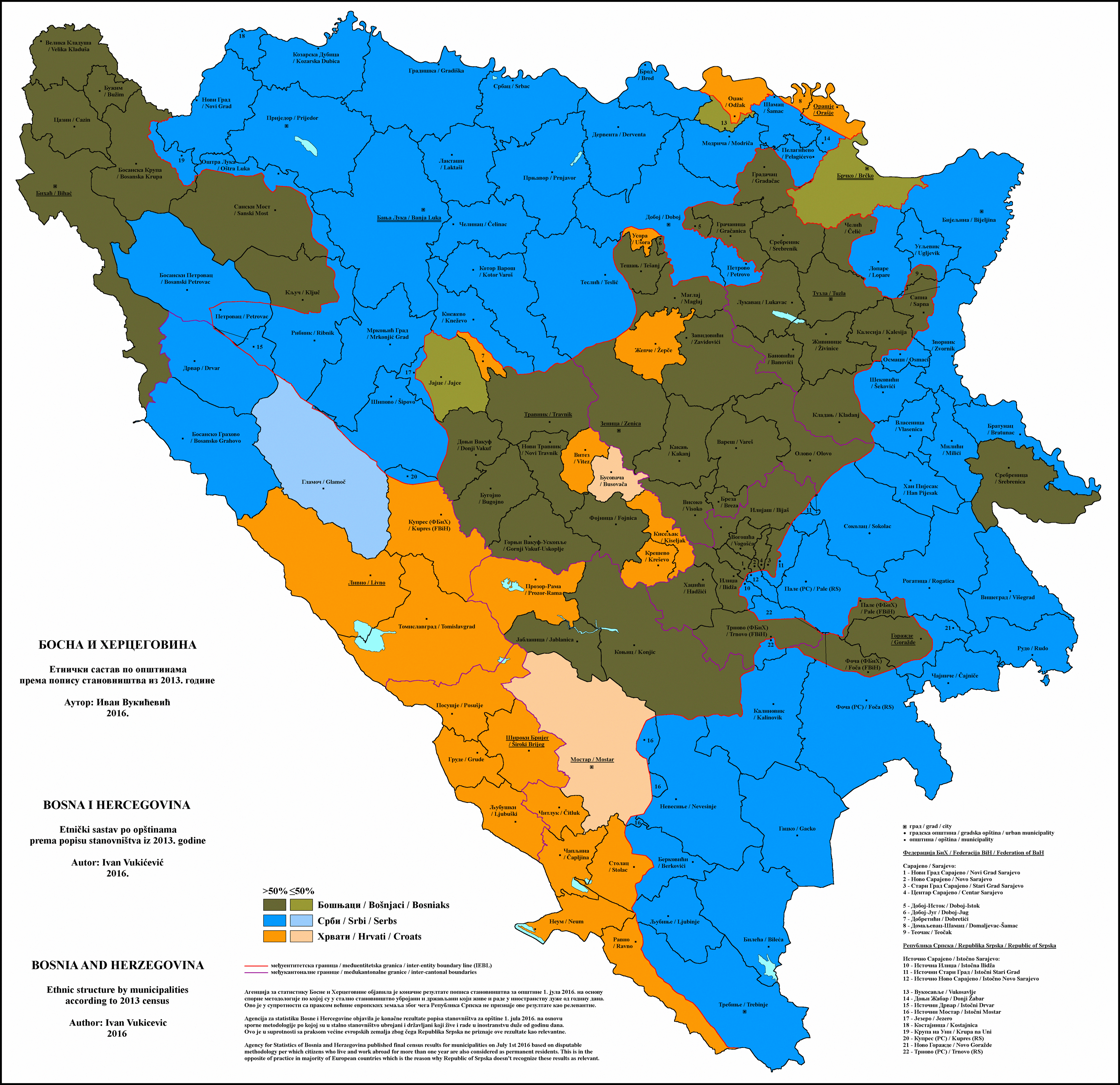
Ethnic structure of Bosnia and Herzegovina by municipalities in 2013

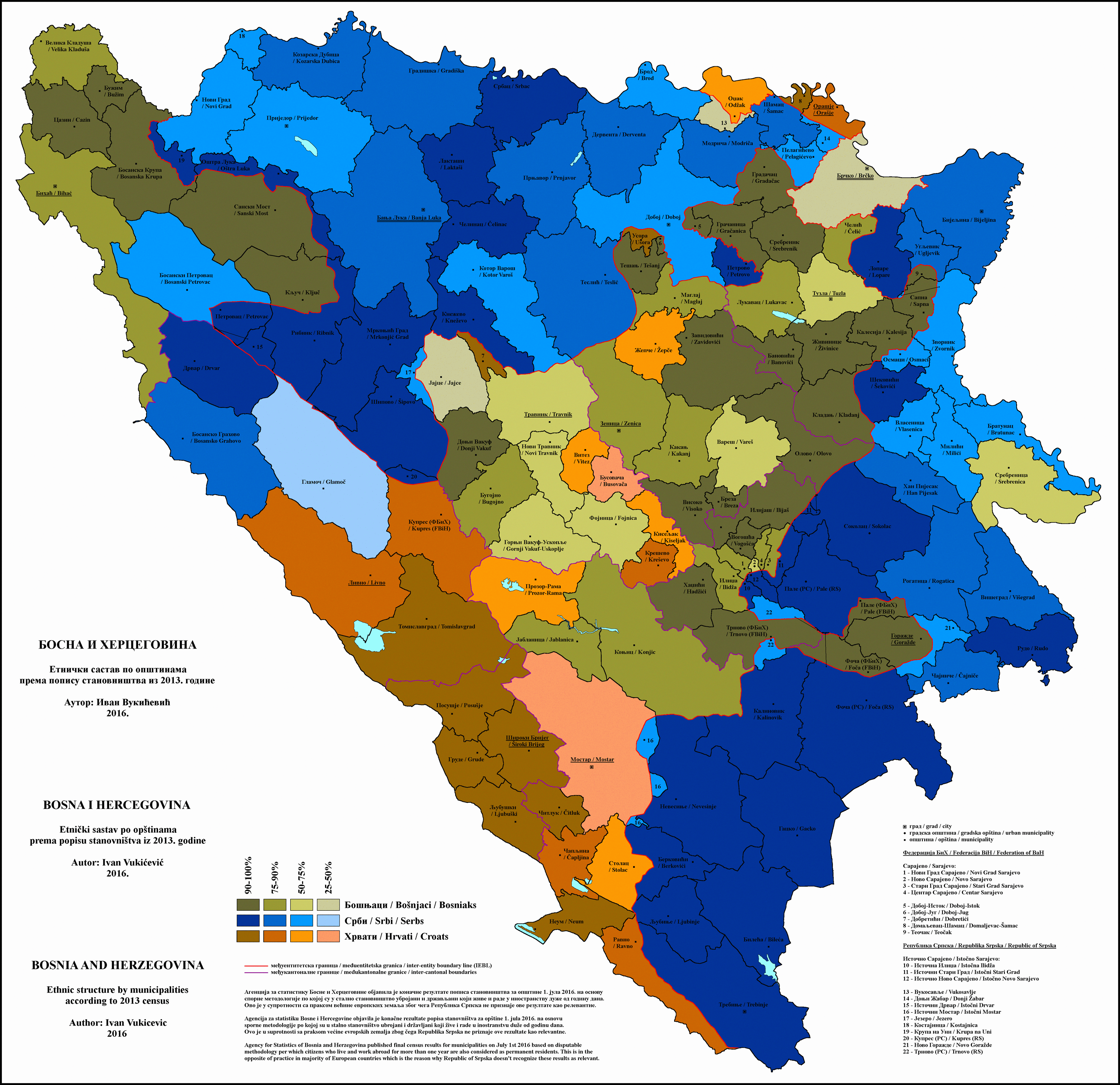
Ethnic structure of Bosnia and Herzegovina by municipalities in 2013

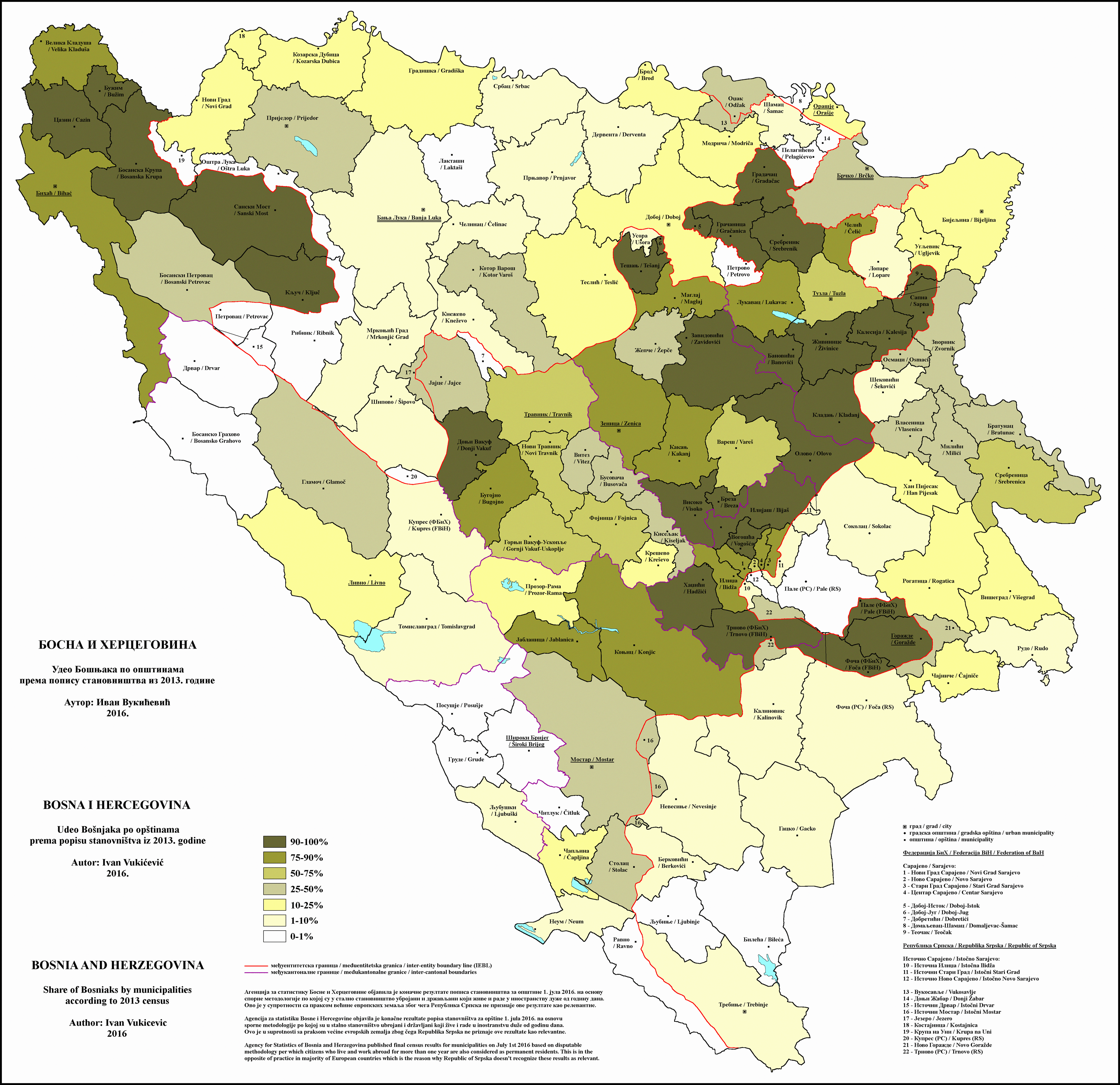
Share of Bosniaks in Bosnia and Herzegovina by municipalities in 2013

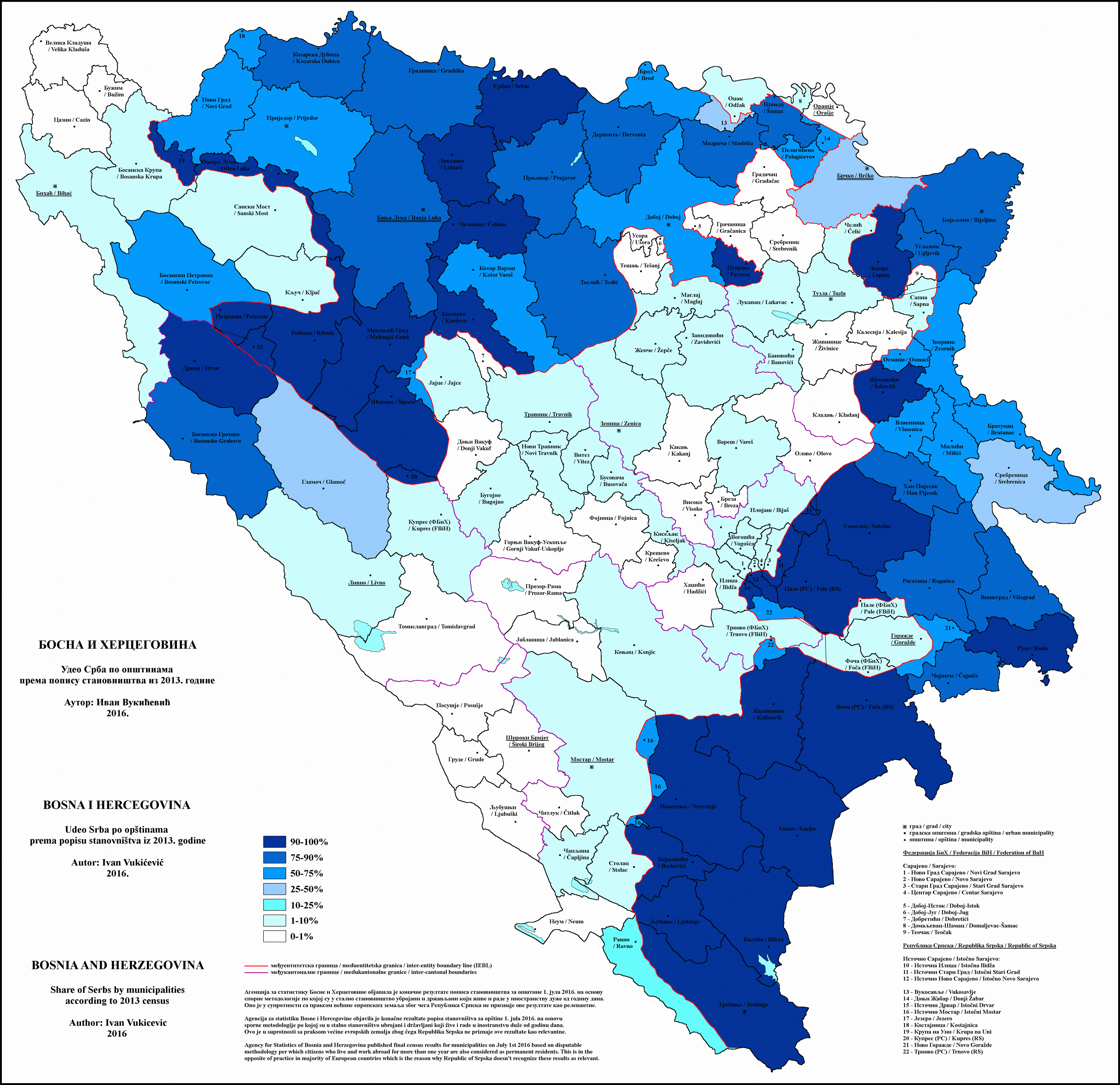
Share of Serbs in Bosnia and Herzegovina by municipalities in 2013

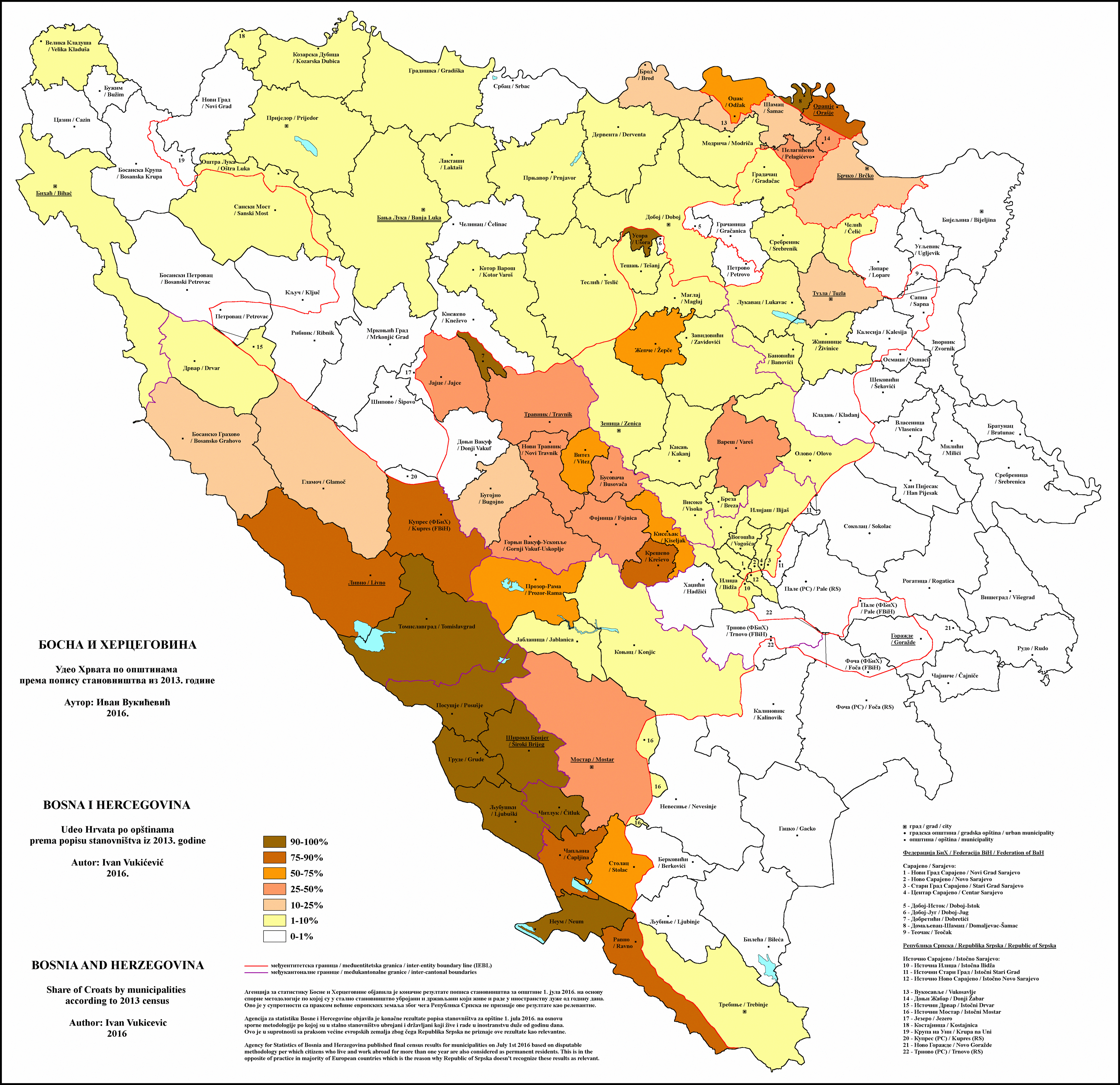
Share of Croats in Bosnia and Herzegovina by municipalities in 2013

== Decision of the Constitutional Court of Bosnia and Herzegovina ==
On 12 February 1998, Alija Izetbegović, at the time Chair of the Presidency of Bosnia and Herzegovina, instituted proceedings before the Constitutional Court for an evaluation of the consistency of the Constitution of the Republika Srpska and the Constitution of the Federation of Bosnia and Herzegovina with the Constitution of Bosnia and Herzegovina. The request was supplemented on 30 March 1998 when the applicant specified which provisions of the Entities' Constitutions he considered to be unconstitutional.

The four partial decisions were made in 2000, by which many of the articles of the constitutions of entities were found to be unconstitutional, which had a great impact on the politics of Bosnia and Herzegovina because there was a need to adjust the current state in the country with the decision of the Court. A narrow majority (5-4) ruled in favor of the applicant. In its decision, among other things, the Court stated:

Elements of a democratic state and society as well as underlying assumptions – pluralism, just procedures, peaceful relations that arise out of the Constitution – must serve as a guideline for further elaboration of the issue of the structure of BiH as a multi-national state. Territorial division (of Entities) must not serve as an instrument of ethnic segregation – on the contrary – it must accommodate ethnic groups by preserving linguistic pluralism and peace in order to contribute to the integration of the state and society as such. The constitutional principle of collective equality of constituent peoples, arising out of the designation of Bosniaks, Croats and Serbs as constituent peoples, prohibits any special privileges for one or two constituent peoples, any domination in governmental structures and any ethnic homogenisation by segregation based on territorial separation. Despite the territorial division of BiH by the establishment of two Entities, this territorial division cannot serve as a constitutional legitimacy for ethnic domination, national homogenisation, or the right to maintain results of ethnic cleansing. Designation of Bosniaks, Croats, and Serbs as constituent peoples in the Preamble of the Constitution of BiH must be understood as an all-inclusive principle of the Constitution of BiH to which the Entities must fully adhere, pursuant to Article III.3 (b) of the Constitution of BiH.

The formal name of this item is U-5/98, but it is widely known as the "Decision on the constituency of peoples", referring to the Court's interpretation of the significance of the phrase "constituent peoples" used in the Preamble of the Constitution of Bosnia and Herzegovina. The decision was also the basis for other notable cases that came before the court.

== Inter-ethnic relations ==
Serbs tend to be Orthodox Christian, Croats tend to be Catholic, and Bosniaks tend to be Muslim. Tensions between these groups were expressed in terms of religion, and religious symbols continue to be used for nationalist purposes. Fundamentalists existed on all sides; so, in regards to propaganda supported by the views of religious leaders, the Bosnian War took on some features of a "religious war." Historical stereotypes and prejudice were further established by experiences of war. On the other hand, it has been found that direct individual experiences of war did not influence the individual's measured ethno-nationalism. The situation still impedes the development of relations post-war. It has been found that ethnic civil war alone does not have a tendency to increase the abundance of ethno-nationalism in a country, though this is context-dependent. Karin Dyrstad argues that the Dayton agreement, although intended to improve relations following the war, damaged them and segregated the country even further. Her argument lies on her finding that local policy change provides the context that determines the lasting effect that ethnic civil wars have on ethnonationalism. So, the Dayton agreement, she argues, is the local policy change that propelled the Bosnian War into having the disastrous post-war effects on inter-ethnic relations that it did. Conversely, the pluralistic makeup of the Dayton agreement suggested it would have a beneficial effect on inter-ethnic relations within the country. Before the war, Bosnia and Herzegovina had rather good inter-ethnic relations compared to other Western Balkan states. In the years following the war, all three ethnic groups experienced a drastic increase in the prevalence of ethno-nationalism, the group with the most dramatic shift being the Serbs. This increased ethno-nationalism contributed to the deterioration of inter-ethnic relations in the country. The prevalence of this ethno-nationalism can be displayed, in part, by the finding that, upon return, almost all displaced persons moved into an area in which their activated ethnic identity aligned with that of the majority. To further exacerbate ethnic homogeneity following the war, ethnic elites were known to sometimes halt the return of displaced persons to their pre-war place of residence.

The magnitude of communal exposure to violence during the Bosnian War has continued to have significant resounding effects on inter-ethnic relations and the political system, even after twenty years. It has been found that communities that had a higher exposure to violence continue to have lower levels of inter-ethnic trust and associate more with their ethnic political party. This leads to ethnic voting, otherwise known as voting along ethnic party lines; though, the levels of ethnic voting have begun to dwindle in recent elections, suggesting the violence's effect on ethnic voting is beginning to decrease. Still, a lasting effect of this violence is that it eroded social networks that extended beyond an individual's ethnic group and diminished the probability of reforming them. Since discussions of the Bosnian War are often contained to the microcosm of an individual's predominantly homogenous social network, there tends to be an absence of opposing viewpoints, which cements ethnic boundaries based on ethnically biased collective memories. The evidence for this is strengthened by Hadzic et al.'s finding that those with social ties that are almost strictly contained to their own ethnic group also tend to have lower levels of inter-ethnic trust than those that do not. They also found that the Bosnian War led to increased ethnic homogeneity, which has been shown to influence government spending on ethnically homogenous areas in a way meant to further induce ethnic voting.

Trends in the geographic concentration of the development of more ethnically homogeneous areas during the war contributed to the location of the eventual Inter-Entity Boundary Line between the Federation of Bosnia and Herzegovina and the Republika Srpska. As a result, the differences in the ethnic makeups of the two entities are drastic; it has been estimated that Bosniaks make up around 73% of the population of the Federation of Bosnia and Herzegovina, while Serbs make up around 81% of the population of the Republika Srpska. All of these factors help to explain the extremity of political polarization along ethnic cleavages, which Larisa Kurtovic termed "ethnic hyper-representation." Hadzic et al. argue that ethnic parties are harming Bosnia and Herzegovina's development and preventing the betterment of inter-ethnic relations, as they are incentivized to withhold universally beneficial policies in order to avoid unintentionally helping out-group members. This argument is reinforced by the counteractive implications of the slogan of the Republika Srpska's governing party: "RS forever and B&H while it has to last." Politicizing ethnicity makes it a focal point of people's everyday lives, driving behavior, cognition, and their experience of emotion. In effect, this politicization perpetuates the poor inter-ethnic relations that have continued to embody Bosnia and Herzegovina since at least the adoption of the Dayton Agreement.

== See also ==
- History of Bosnia and Herzegovina
- Demographics of Bosnia and Herzegovina
- Exodus of Muslims from Serbia
- Yugoslav wars
- 1953 population census in Bosnia and Herzegovina
- Romani people in Bosnia and Herzegovina

== Sources ==
- Bougarel, Xavier (1996). "Bosnia and Hercegovina – State and Communitarianism". In Dyker, David A.; Vejvoda, Ivan (eds.). Yugoslavia and After: A Study in Fragmentation, Despair and Rebirth. London-New York: Routledge. ISBN 9780582246379.
- Bougarel, Xavier (2017). Islam and Nationhood in Bosnia-Herzegovina: Surviving Empires. New York: Bloomsbury Publishing. ISBN 9781350003590.
- Donia, Robert J.; Fine, John Van Antwerp Jr. (1994). Bosnia and Hercegovina: A Tradition Betrayed. London: C. Hurst & Co. Publishers. ISBN 978-1-85065-212-0.
- Eller, Jack David (1999). "Bosnia". From Culture to Ethnicity to Conflict: An Anthropological Perspective on International Ethnic Conflict. University of Michigan Press. pp. 243–. ISBN 0-472-08538-7.
- Fischer, Martina, ed. (2006). Peacebuilding and Civil Society in Bosnia-Herzegovina: Ten Years After Dayton. Berghof Forschungszentrum für Konstruktive Konfliktbearbeitung; LIT Verlag Münster. pp. 21–. ISBN 978-3-8258-8793-3.
- Jović, Dejan (2009). Yugoslavia: A State that Withered Away. Purdue University Press. ISBN 978-1-55753-495-8.
- Kaufman, Stuart (2003). "Ethnic conflict and Eurasian security". In Kay, Sean; Sperling, James; Papacosma, S. Victor (eds.). Limiting Institutions?: The Challenge of Eurasian Security Governance. Manchester: Manchester University Press. ISBN 9780719066054.
- Puhalo, S. (2003). "Etnička distanca građana Republike Srpske i Federacije BiH prema narodima bivše SFRJ". Psihologija. 36 (2): 141–156. doi:10.2298/PSI0302141P.
- Redžić, Enver (2005). Bosnia and Herzegovina in the Second World War. Frank Cass. ISBN 0714656259.
- Danijela Majstorovic; Vladimir Turjacanin (2013). Youth Ethnic and National Identity in Bosnia and Herzegovina: Social Science Approaches. Palgrave Macmillan UK. ISBN 978-1-349-46717-4.
- Nielsen, Christian Axboe (2014). Making Yugoslavs: Identity in King Aleksandar's Yugoslavia. University of Toronto Press. ISBN 978-1-4426-2750-5.
- Trbovich, Ana S. (2008). A Legal Geography of Yugoslavia's Disintegration. Oxford University Press. ISBN 978-0-19-533343-5.
- Velikonja, Mitja (2003). Religious Separation and Political Intolerance in Bosnia-Herzegovina. Texas A&M University Press. ISBN 978-1-60344-724-9.
