= Fazlija (singer) =

Bosnian singer (born 1972)

- Born: Fadil Fazlija; 15 July 1972 (age 54); Bihać, SR Bosnia and Herzegovina, SFR Yugoslavia
- Genres: Turbo-folk, folk
- Occupation: Singer
- Instrument: Vocals
- Years active: 1997–present
- Labels: Lazarević, VIP Production, Gold Music
- Spouse: Ajka Kovačević

Fadil Fazlija (born 15 July 1972), known professionally as Fazlija, is a Bosnian-Romani turbo-folk singer. He achieved international fame in 2021 when his 2016 song "Helikopter" went viral on TikTok – garnering attention from international celebrities – such as the Kardashian family, Britney Spears, and footballers of Real Madrid.

== Music career ==
Fazlija began his music career in 1997 with his first Studio album "Prosjak i kraljica" who was produced by Samir Mujagić and released by label "Lazarević". He received wider recognition for his song "Helikopter" in 2021, which became a popular trend on TikTok, and later on hit the charts in other countries. The song ranked 70 in the charts in Austria in November 2023.
