= Ledi Bianku =

Albanian judge

Ledi Bianku (born 22 February 1971 in Shkodër, Albania) was a judge at the European Court of Human Rights, elected in respect of Albania on 1 February 2008.

He received his law degree from the University of Tirana in 1993, and also studied concurrently at the University of Trento in Italy 1992–1993. He practiced as a lawyer in Tirana 1994–1998 and 1999–2006, and was lecturer in law (Public International Law, European Human Rights Law and European Union Law) at the University of Tirana 1995–2007 and at the Albanian School of Magistrates 1997–2007. He concurrently studied at the College of Europe in Belgium 1996–1997 (LL.M.).

He worked at the Office of the OSCE Legal Counsellor in Albania 1998–1999, was founder and Executive Director of the European Centre in Tirana 1999–2006, advisor ad personam to the President of the Republic, to the President of the Parliament and to Minister of Justice and the Minister of European Affairs 2000–2007. He was also Chairman of the National Broadcasting Authority 2006–2007 and a member of the Venice Commission 2006–2007. From October 2021, he is a foreign judge of Constitutional Court of Bosnia and Herzegovina.

In 2021, Bianku served one of the judges of the Turkey Tribunal held in Geneva, Switzerland along with 5 other reputable international jurists.
