= Dean Spielmann =

Luxembourgish lawyer and judge (born 1962)

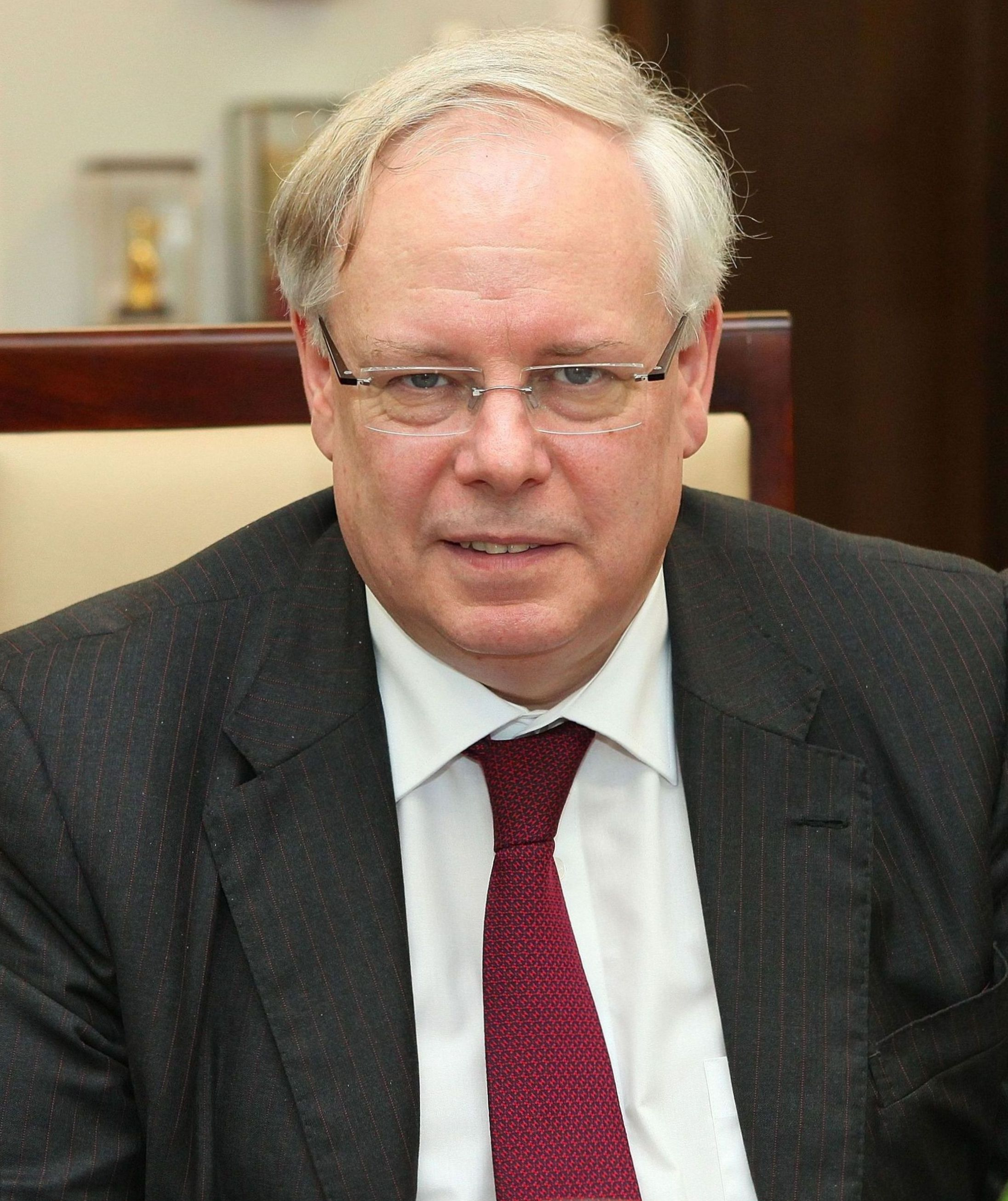

President of the European Court of Human Rights
- In office 1 November 2012 – 31 October 2015
- Preceded by: Nicolas Bratza
- Succeeded by: Guido Raimondi

Judge of the European Court of Human Rights in respect of Luxembourg
- In office 24 June 2004 – 31 October 2015
- Preceded by: Marc Fischbach
- Succeeded by: Georges Ravarani

Advocate General at the European Court of Justice
- Incumbent
- Assumed office 7 October 2024

Personal details
- Born: 26 October 1962 (age 63) Luxembourg City, Luxembourg
- Education: Catholic University of Louvain; Fitzwilliam College, Cambridge
- Profession: Lawyer

Dean Spielmann (born 26 October 1962) is a Luxembourgish lawyer and a former president of the European Court of Human Rights. Since 2024 he served as an advocate general at the European Court of Justice.

Previously Spielmann has been a judge of the European Court of Human Rights in respect of Luxembourg between 2004 and 2015, including as the Court's elected vice-president and president. In 2016, he was appointed as a judge at the General Court of the European Union where he served until 2024.

He is also a member of the Grand Ducal Institute of Luxembourg and has held academic posts at the universities of Luxembourg, Nancy and Louvain.

== Early life ==
Spielmann was born in Luxembourg and studied law at the Catholic University of Louvain in Belgium (bachelor's degree, 1988) and Fitzwilliam College, Cambridge in the United Kingdom (Master of Laws, 1990).

== Legal career ==
Spielmann was admitted to the Luxembourg Bar in 1989, practising there until 2004. From 1991 to 1997, he was assistant lecturer in criminal law at the Catholic University of Louvain. He also taught at the University of Luxembourg from 1996 to 2004 and the University of Nancy from 1997 to 2008.

Spielmann was the judge of the European Court of Human Rights in respect of Luxembourg between 24 June 2004 and 31 October 2015. He served as president of the Fifth Section of the Court between 1 February 2011 and 31 October 2012, including as vice-president of the Court between 13 September 2012 and 31 October 2012. In 2012, he was elected president of the Court for a three-year term between 1 November 2012 and 31 October 2015.

On 13 April 2016, Spielmann was appointed as a judge at the General Court of the European Union where he served as a president of chamber between 30 September 2019 and 6 October 2024. On 27 March 2024, he was appointed as an advocate general at the European Court of Justice, with effect from 7 October 2024.

== See also ==
- List of judges of the European Court of Human Rights
- List of members of the European Court of Justice
