= Ineta Ziemele =

Latvian judge, member of the Court of Justice of the European Union

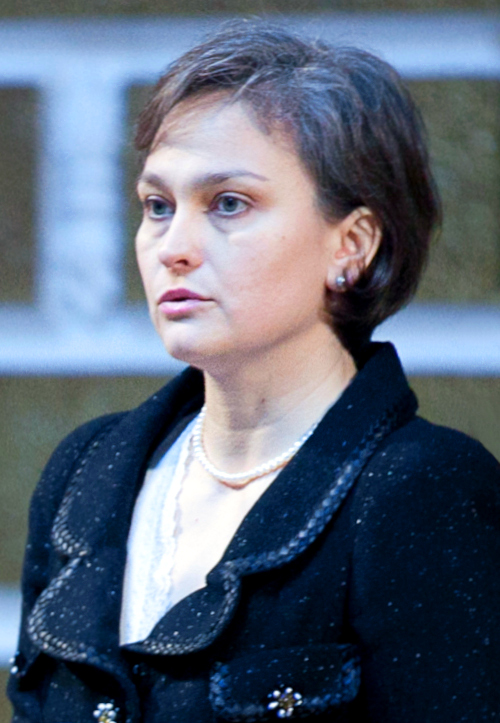

Judge of the European Court of Justice
- Incumbent
- Assumed office 2 September 2020

President of the Constitutional Court of Latvia
- In office 8 May 2017 – 2 October 2020

Judge of the European Court of Human Rights in respect of Latvia
- In office 27 April 2005 – 1 January 2015

Personal details
- Born: 12 February 1970 (age 56) Riga
- Education: University of Latvia
- Profession: Judge, jurist

Ineta Ziemele (born 12 February 1970) is a Latvian jurist and judge, currently serving at the Court of Justice of the European Union since 2020. Previously, she was a judge at the Constitutional Court of Latvia and its president from 2017 to 2020.

She graduated from the law faculty of the University of Latvia in 1993 and continued her studies in Sweden, where she earned a master's degree in International law. She went on to earn her doctoral degree from University of Cambridge at Wolfson College. She has worked as an adviser for the Foreign Affairs Committee of the Saeima and for the Prime Minister of Latvia. She also has been a professor at the University of Latvia and the Riga Graduate School of Law. In 1995, she was a founding member of the Latvian Section of the International Commission of Jurists.

From 27 April 2005 to 2015, she was a judge at the European Court of Human Rights (ECHR). In September 2012 she became President of the Court's Fourth Section. As a judge of the ECHR, she was cited in an NGO report for possible conflicts of interest. The report showed that she seated in six cases where the International Commission of Jurists was involved and others cases where the Open Society Justice Initiative (OSJI) and other affiliated organizations were involved (the OSJI is cited only because she is a professor at the Riga Graduate School of Law, funded by the Open Society Foundations-Latvia).

Ziemele was chosen as a judge at the Constitutional Court of the Republic of Latvia from 8 January 2015. On 8 May 2017 she was elected as President of the Constitutional Court.

On 2 September 2020 she resigned from the Constitutional Court, as she was appointed as a judge at the Court of Justice of the European Union for the period from 7 September 2020 to 6 October 2024. Her term was subsequently extended, with her serving as the President of the Sixth Chamber of the court.

In 2017, Ziemele became a Corresponding Member of the Latvian Academy of Sciences. She was promoted to a Full Member in November 2025.

== Awards ==
- Order of the Three Stars, 4th Class (2014)
- Certificate of Recognition of the Cabinet of Ministers of Latvia (2016)
- Certificate of Honor of Jelgava Municipality (2018)
- Latvian Judicial System Badge/Medal of Honor, 1st Class (2018)

== Books ==
- Ziemele, Ineta (2005). State Continuity and Nationality: The Baltic States and Russia. Martinus Nijhoff Publishers. ISBN 90-04-14295-9.
