= Jean-Paul Costa =

French jurist (1941–2023)

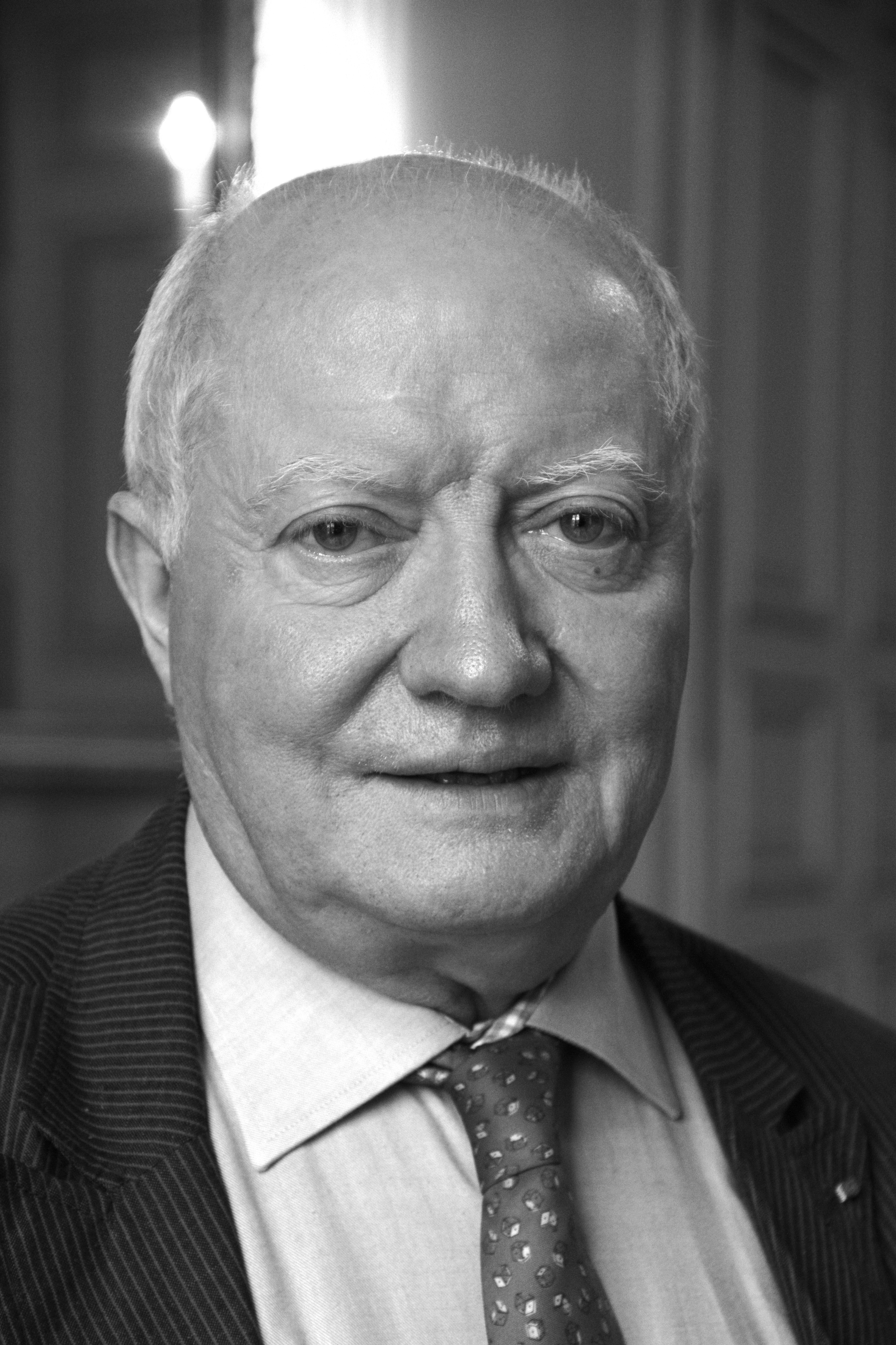
- Costa in 2013

President of the European Court of Human Rights
- In office 19 January 2007 – 3 November 2011
- Vice President: Christos Rozakis; Sir Nicolas Bratza
- Preceded by: Luzius Wildhaber
- Succeeded by: Sir Nicolas Bratza

Personal details
- Born: 3 November 1941 Tunis, French Tunisia
- Died: 27 April 2023 (aged 81) Dordogne, France
- Education: Lycée Henri-IV
- Alma mater: Sciences Po, ÉNA
- Profession: Lawyer
- Website: www.echr.coe.int

Jean-Paul Costa (3 November 1941 – 27 April 2023) was a French jurist and was the President of the European Court of Human Rights from 19 January 2007 until his term at the Court ended on 3 November 2011. He was first appointed a judge of the Court on 1 November 1998, and in 2009 was elected to serve an additional three years as President.

== Early life ==
Costa was born in Tunis, the capital of French Tunisia, on 3 November 1941. He was educated at the Lycée Carnot in the city, but his family left when the country declared independence in 1957. He was then educated at the prestigious Lycée Henri-IV in Paris, before studying at the Institut d'Études Politiques de Paris, better known as Sciences Po, graduating with an undergraduate diploma in 1961, Master of Laws in 1962 and Diploma of Superior Studies in Public Law in 1964. He then studied from 1964 to 1966 at the École nationale d'administration (National Management School).

== Career ==
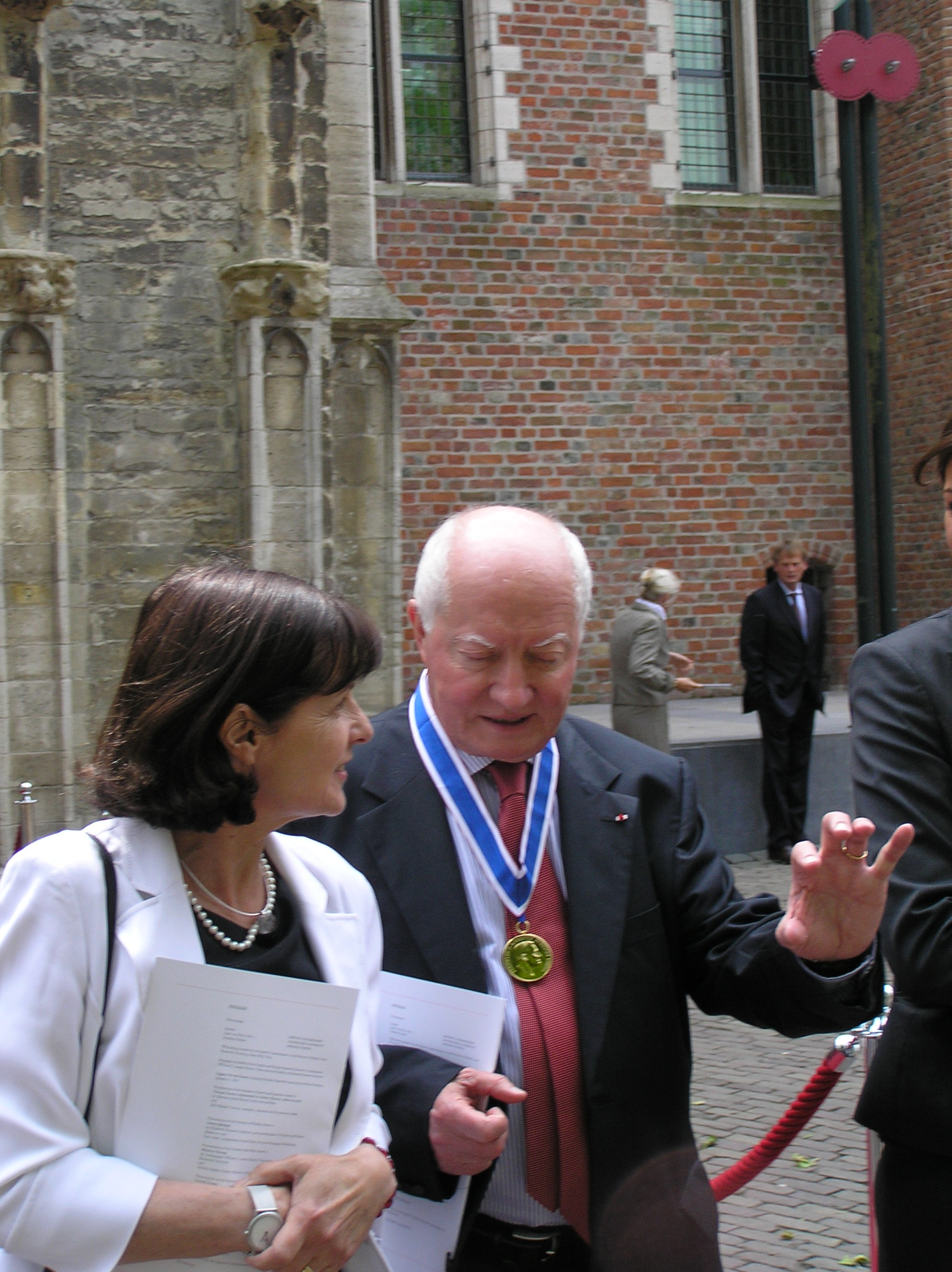
Costa, after receiving the Four Freedoms Award on behalf of the ECtHR, 29 May 2010

In June 1966, Costa was appointed Auditeur in the Council of State, a body of the French national government that provides the executive branch with legal advice and acts as the administrative court of last resort. From 1968 to 1973, he lectured at Sciences Po, and from 1981 to 1984 was Director of the Office of the Minister of National Education, Alain Savary. From 1985 to 1986, he led the French delegation negotiating the construction of the Channel Tunnel, and from 1985 to 1989 taught at the International Institute of Public Administration. He was then appointed Visiting Professor at the University of Orléans (1989-1998) and the Sorbonne (1992-1998). After the end of his function as President of the European Court of Human Rights, he was appointed the president of International Institute of Human Rights.

== European Court of Human Rights ==
On 1 January, he was appointed the judge in respect of France at the newly-permanent European Court of Human Rights. On 1 May 2000, he rose to become a Section President and on 1 November 2001 Vice-President of the Court. On 19 January 2007, he succeeded Swiss Luzius Wildhaber as President of the Court. He was re-elected to this post in 2009. His function as President ended on 3 November 2011. He was succeeded by Sir Nicolas Bratza.

== Death ==
Costa died in Dordogne on 27 April 2023, at the age of 81.
