= Peer Lorenzen =

Danish judge (born 1944)

Judge Peer Lorenzen is a section president of the European Court of Human Rights. He was born in Denmark in 1944, and studied at Aarhus University. From 1995 to 1999 he was a member of the European Commission of Human Rights, and was appointed a judge in the ECHR on 1 November 1998.
