= Nicolas Bratza =

British judge

The Honourable Sir Nicolas Bratza
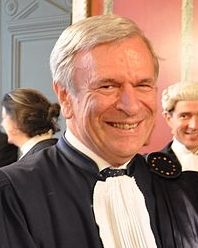
- Bratza at the Red Mass at Westminster Cathedral, 1 October 2010

President of the European Court of Human Rights
- In office 3 November 2011 – 31 October 2012
- Preceded by: Jean-Paul Costa
- Succeeded by: Dean Spielmann

Judge of the European Court of Human Rights in respect of the United Kingdom
- In office 1998 – 31 October 2012
- Preceded by: Sir John Freeland
- Succeeded by: Paul Mahoney

Personal details
- Born: 3 March 1945 (age 81)
- Education: University of Oxford
- Profession: Barrister

Sir Nicolas Dušan Bratza (born 3 March 1945) is a British jurist and a former President of the European Court of Human Rights.

Bratza was the Judge of the Court in respect of the United Kingdom, the second person to hold the post as a full-time appointment since Protocol 11 to the European Convention on Human Rights established the Court as a permanent body. His term ended on 31 October 2012. He was appointed as a board member of the International Service for Human Rights in May 2013.

== Early life ==
Bratza was born on 3 March 1945 and educated at Wimbledon College, a state-maintained Jesuit school for boys. His father was Milan Bratza, a Serbian concert violinist who settled in London after the First World War, and his mother, an operatic singer, came from the Russell family, which has produced three generations of Law Lords (Charles Russell, Frank Russell and Charles Ritchie Russell). He studied law at Brasenose College, Oxford, and was awarded a first class degree. He then spent two years teaching at the University of Pennsylvania Law School before being called to the bar at Lincoln's Inn in 1969, where he was a Hardwicke and Droop Scholar. He was appointed a Bencher of the Inn in 1993.

== Legal career ==
Bratza was appointed Junior Counsel to the Crown at Common Law in 1979 and took silk as Queen's Counsel in 1988. He acted in 1981 for the UK Government at the European Court of Human Rights against Jeffrey Dudgeon who complained successfully that the law in Northern Ireland, which made homosexual acts between consenting adult males a criminal offence, was a breach of the convention. In 1993, Bratza was appointed a Recorder of the Crown Court and elected a Bencher of Lincoln's Inn.

In the same year, he was appointed as the UK Member of the European Commission of Human Rights, part of the European Convention on Human Rights system of the Council of Europe. In 1998, the commission was abolished and replaced by a permanent European Court of Human Rights, and Bratza was elected as the Judge of this Court representing the United Kingdom. The eligibility criteria for appointment, however, required that Bratza hold judicial office in his home territory, and for this reason he was appointed a High Court judge. This afforded him the title The Hon. Mr. Justice Bratza, but at the European Court he is referred to simply as Sir Nicolas Bratza. In the same year, and again in 2001, he was elected as one of the five section presidents of the court. He was elected to a second and final term as a judge of the court (ending 31 October 2012) and re-elected as a section president in 2004. He was a vice-president of the court from 19 January 2007 to 3 November 2011. In July 2011, he was elected to succeed Jean-Paul Costa as President of the court on 3 November 2011. His term on the court ended on 31 October 2012, and he resigned as a Justice of the High Court on 1 November 2012.

=== Other appointments ===
Bratza was appointed as President of the British Institute of Human Rights Advisory Board in February 2013, a member of the advisory board of the British Institute of International and Comparative Law, a member of the editorial board of the European Human Rights Law Review and a member of the advisory board of the European Human Rights Association.

In June 2007, he received the degree of Doctor of Laws, honoris causa, from the University of Glasgow.

In 2014, Bratza became an ambassador for Toynbee Hall. It marked a return to the East London charity, where he had volunteered at its Free Legal Advice Centre during the late 1970s and early 1980s.

In 2018, Bratza became a member of the executive committee of the International Commission of Jurists, having served as a Commissioner since 2013.
