= Christos Rozakis =

Greek judge (born 1941)

Christos Rozakis (Greek: Χρήστος Ροζάκης, born 1941 in Athens) is a Greek judge, and currently the President of the Administrative Tribunal of the Council of Europe. He was formerly the first vice-president of the European Court of Human Rights. In 1996, he also served briefly as a Deputy Foreign Minister of Greece.

He studied Law in the University of Athens and continued his studies at University College London (LL.M 1970), the University of Illinois (LL.M 1971, J.S.D. 1973) and the Graduate Institute of International Studies in Geneva.

Rozakis was member of the European Commission of Human Rights since 1987, and has been member of ECtHR since 1998.

His dissenting opinions include those in Grand Chamber cases Sahin v. Germany, Ždanoka v. Latvia, Kingsley v. the United Kingdom, McElhinney v. Ireland, Al-Adsani v. the United Kingdom. He also joined dissents in Grand Chamber cases Bykov v. Russia, Blecic v. Croatia, Janowski v. Poland, K. and T. v. Finland, Draon v. France, Maurice v. France.
