= Greek case =

1967 human rights case against Greece

Submitted 20 and 27 September 1967, 25 March 1968 Decided 5 November 1969
- Case: 3321/67 (Denmark v. Greece), 3322/67 (Norway v. Greece), 3323/67 (Sweden v. Greece), 3344/67 (Netherlands v. Greece)
- Case type: Interstate
- Chamber: European Commission of Human Rights
- Language of proceedings: English

Ruling
- Breaches of Articles 3, 5, 6, 8, 9, 10, 11, 13, and 14 as well as Article 3 of Protocol 1

Commission composition
- President; Adolf Süsterhenn
- Judges: Max Sørensen; Constantin Eustathiades; James Fawcett; Felix Ermacora; Frede Castberg; Giuseppe Sperduti; Michalakis Triantafyllides; Felix Welter; Tahsin Bekir Balta; Gaius de Gaay Fortman; Philip O'Donoghue; Pedro Delahaye; Theódór Björnsson Líndal; Edwin Busuttil

Instruments cited
- European Convention on Human Rights and Protocol 1

In September 1967, Denmark, Norway, Sweden and the Netherlands brought the Greek case to the European Commission of Human Rights, alleging violations of the European Convention of Human Rights (ECHR) by the Greek junta, which had taken power earlier that year. In 1969, the Commission found serious violations, including torture; the junta reacted by withdrawing from the Council of Europe. The case received significant press coverage and was "one of the most famous cases in the Convention's history", according to legal scholar Ed Bates.

On 21 April 1967, right-wing army officers staged a military coup that ousted the Greek government and used mass arrests, purges and censorship to suppress their opposition. These tactics soon became the target of criticism in the Parliamentary Assembly of the Council of Europe, but Greece claimed they were necessary as a response to alleged Communist subversion and justified under Article 15 of the ECHR. In September 1967, Denmark, Norway, Sweden, and the Netherlands filed identical cases against Greece alleging violations of most of the articles in the ECHR that protect individual rights. The case was declared admissible in January 1968; a second case filed by Denmark, Norway and Sweden for additional violations, especially of Article 3 forbidding torture, was declared admissible in May of that year.

In 1968 and early 1969, a Subcommission held closed hearings concerning the case, during which it questioned witnesses and embarked on a fact-finding mission to Greece, cut short due to obstruction by the authorities. Evidence at the trial ran to over 20,000 pages, but was condensed into a 1,200-page report, most of which was devoted to proving systematic torture by the Greek authorities. The Subcommission submitted its report to the Commission in October 1969. It was soon leaked to the press and widely reported, turning European public opinion against Greece. The Commission found violations of Article 3 and most of the other articles. On 12 December 1969, the Committee of Ministers of the Council of Europe considered a resolution on Greece. When it became apparent that Greece would lose the vote, foreign minister Panagiotis Pipinelis denounced the ECHR and walked out. Greece was the first (and until the 2022 exit of Russia, the only) state to leave the Council of Europe; it returned to the organization after the Greek democratic transition in 1974.

Although the case revealed the limits of the Convention system to curb the behavior of a non-cooperative dictatorship, it also strengthened the legitimacy of the system by isolating and stigmatizing a state responsible for systematic human rights violations. The Commission's report on the case also set a precedent for what it considered torture, inhuman and degrading treatment, and other aspects of the Convention.

== Background ==
In the aftermath of World War II, European democratic states created the Council of Europe, an organization dedicated to promoting human rights and preventing a relapse into totalitarianism. The Statute of the Council of Europe (1949) required its members to adhere to a basic standard of democracy and human rights. In 1950 the Council of Europe approved the draft European Convention on Human Rights (ECHR), which came into force three years later. The European Commission of Human Rights (1954) and European Court of Human Rights (1959) were set up to adjudicate alleged violations of the Convention. The Convention organs operate on the basis of subsidiarity and cases are only admissible when the applicants have exhausted domestic legal remedy (recourse to the national legal system to enforce one's rights).

Greece was a founding member of the Council of Europe, and in 1953 the Hellenic Parliament unanimously ratified both the ECHR and its first protocol. Greece did not allow individuals who alleged that their rights had been violated by the Greek government to make applications to the Commission, so the only way to hold the country accountable for violations was if another state party to the ECHR brought a case on their behalf. Greece was not a party of the Court, which can issue legally binding judgements, so if the Commission found evidence of a violation, it was up to the Committee of Ministers to resolve the case. Although the Council of Europe has considerable investigatory abilities, it has hardly any power of sanction; its highest sanction is expulsion from the organization. In 1956, Greece filed the first interstate application with the Commission, Greece v. United Kingdom, alleging human rights violations in British Cyprus.

=== 21 April 1967 coup ===
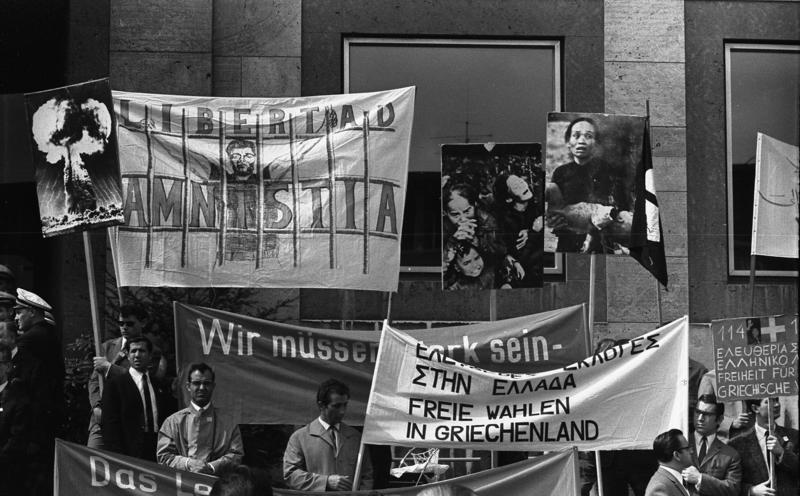
Anti-junta protest in Stuttgart, West Germany, 1 May 1967

On 21 April 1967, right-wing army officers staged a military coup shortly before the 1967 Greek legislative election was scheduled to occur. Alleging the coup was necessary to save Greece from Communist subversion, the new Greek junta governed the country as a military dictatorship. Its first edict was to issue Royal Decree no. 280, which cancelled several articles in the 1952 Constitution of Greece because of an indefinite official emergency. More than six thousand regime opponents were arrested immediately and imprisoned; purges, martial law, and censorship also targeted the ruling junta's opponents. The following months saw public demonstrations outside Greece opposing the junta. The suggestion of referring Greece to the European Commission of Human Rights was first raised in Politiken, a Danish newspaper, a week after the coup.

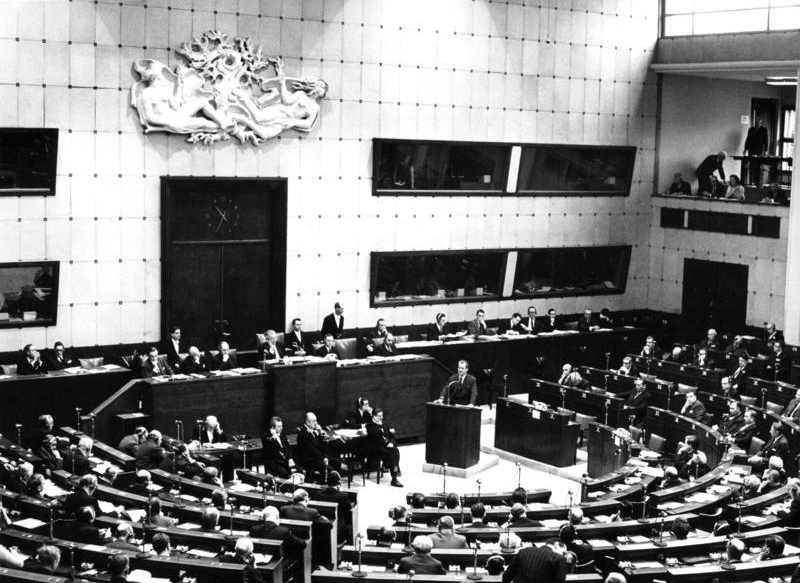
24 January 1967 meeting of the Parliamentary Assembly of the Council of Europe

The junta became a target of vociferous criticism in the Parliamentary Assembly of the Council of Europe for its human rights violations. On 24 April, the Parliamentary Assembly debated the Greek issue. The Greek representatives were not present at this meeting because the junta dissolved the Greek parliament and canceled their credentials. On 26 April, the Assembly passed Directive 256, inquiring into the fate of the missing Greek deputies, calling for the restoration of parliamentary, constitutional democracy, and objecting to "all measures contrary to the European Convention on Human Rights". Although both the assembly and the Committee of Ministers showed a reluctance to alienate Greece, ignoring the coup entirely would have put the Council of Europe's legitimacy at stake.

On 3 May 1967, the junta sent a letter to the Secretary General of the Council of Europe, announcing Greece was in a state of emergency, which justified human rights violations under Article 15 of the European Convention on Human Rights. This implicit acknowledgement that the junta did not respect human rights was later seized upon by the Netherlands, Sweden, Norway and Denmark as the grounds for their complaint to the Commission. Greece did not provide any reason for this derogation until 19 September, when it asserted that the political situation before the coup justified emergency measures. The Commission considered this to be an undue delay.

On 22–24 May, the Legal Committee met and proposed another resolution against the junta. The Standing Committee of the Assembly adopted this as Resolution 346 on 23 June. The resolution stated Greece had violated Article 3 of the Statute of the Council of Europe: "Every member ... must accept the principles of the rule of law and of the enjoyment by all persons within its jurisdiction of human rights and fundamental freedoms." The resolution expressed "the wish that the Governments of the Contracting Parties to the European Convention on Human Rights refer the Greek case, either separately or jointly, to the European Commission of Human Rights in accordance with Article 24 of the Convention". (Note: This article refers to the numbering and wording of the Convention as in force at the time of the case. The numbering of articles has been altered by subsequent protocols.) On 10 September, the Parliamentary Assembly debated documents prepared by the Legal Committee which stated that, although only the Commission could make a legally binding determination, the Greek derogation of the Convention was not justified.

== Admissibility ==
=== First application ===
Under Resolution 346, on 20 September 1967, three member-states of the Council of Europe (Sweden, Norway, and Denmark) filed identical applications against Greece before the Commission. They alleged violations of almost all the articles in the ECHR which protect individual rights: 5 (right to liberty and security of person), 6 (right to a fair trial), 8 (right to private and family life), 9 (freedom of thought, conscience and religion), 10 (freedom of expression), 11 (freedom of peaceful assembly and association), 13 (right to a legal remedy), and 14 (non-discrimination in securing the rights under the Convention, including on the basis of political belief). The applicants also stated Greece had not shown its invocation of Article 15 (derogations) to be valid. The applications, based on public decrees which prima facie (at first glance) violated the ECHR, referred to previous discussions in the Parliamentary Assembly in which the Greek junta was criticized. The next day, Belgian politician Fernand Dehousse proposed that the European Community bring a similar case against Greece, with which the EC had an association agreement. Although his proposal did not receive support, the EC cut off all economic aid to Greece. On 27 September, the Netherlands joined the suit with an identical application; the Commission merged all four applications on 2 October.

The Scandinavian countries did not have an ethnic affinity to the victims of human rights violations, (Note: As was the case in previous interstate ECHR cases such as Greece v. United Kingdom (1956) and Austria v. Italy (1961).) nor did they have a commercial interest in the case; they intervened because they felt it was their moral duty and because public opinion in their countries was opposed to the actions of the Greek junta. Max Sørensen, the president of the Commission, said that the case was "the first time that the machinery of the Convention ... had been set rolling by states with no national interest in lodging an application and apparently motivated by the desire to preserve our European heritage of freedom unharmed". Although the case was unprecedented in that it was brought without national self-interest, international promotion of human rights was characteristic of Scandinavian foreign policy at the time. Following attempts to boycott goods from the applicant countries in Greece, exporter industries pressured their governments to drop the case. For this reason, the Netherlands withdrew from active participation in the case.

Belgium, Luxembourg and Iceland later announced that they supported the actions of the Scandinavian and Dutch governments, although this declaration had no legal effect. Attempts to elicit a similar declaration from the United Kingdom were unsuccessful, despite the opposition of many British people to the junta. The Wilson government stated that it "did not believe it would be helpful in present circumstances to arraign Greece under the Human Rights Convention".

The Greeks claimed the case was inadmissible because the junta was a revolutionary government and "the original objects of the revolution could not be subject to the control of the Commission". It argued that governments had a margin of appreciation (latitude of governments to implement the Convention as they see fit) to enact exceptional measures in a public emergency. The Commission found the emergency principle was not applicable because it was intended for governments which operated within a democratic and constitutional framework, and furthermore the junta created the "emergency" itself. Therefore, it declared the case admissible on 24 January 1968—allowing it to proceed to a full investigation.

=== Second application ===
On 24 November 1967, The Guardian reporter and human rights lawyer Cedric Thornberry published an article investigating several cases of torture in Greece, finding that it "appears to be common practice". On 27 January 1968, Amnesty International published a report by two lawyers, Anthony Marreco and James Becket, who had traveled to Greece and collected first-hand accounts of human rights violations, including a list of 32 people who said that they had been tortured. As a result of these findings, the three Scandinavian countries filed another application on 25 March 1968 for breach of Articles 3 (no torture or inhuman or degrading treatment) and 7 (no ex post facto/retroactive law), as well as Articles 1 (right to property) and 3 (right to free elections) of Protocol 1 of the ECHR. The Greek government argued domestic remedies were available for these alleged violations, and therefore the application should be declared inadmissible under Article 26 of the ECHR. The applicants countered that such remedies were "in fact inadequate and ineffective".

The Commission noted three circumstances that undermined the effectiveness of domestic remedies. First, people under administrative detention (i.e. without trial or conviction) had no recourse to a court. Second, Decree no. 280 suspended many of the constitutional guarantees related to the judicial system. Third, on 30 May, the Greek junta regime fired 30 prominent judges and prosecutors, including the president of the Supreme Civil and Criminal Court of Greece, for involvement in a decision that displeased the junta. The Commission noted in its report that this action showed the Greek judicial system lacked judicial independence. Therefore, according to the Commission, "in the particular situation prevailing in Greece, the domestic remedies indicated by the respondent government could [not] be considered effective and sufficient". The application was declared admissible on 31 May.

The allegation of torture raised the public profile of the case in Europe and changed the Greek junta's defense strategy, since Article 15 explicitly forbade derogation of Article 3. From 1968, the Commission gave the case priority over all other business; as it was a part-time organization, the Greek case absorbed almost all of its time. On 3 April 1968, a Subcommission was formed to examine the Greek case, initially based on the first application. It held hearings at the end of September, deciding to hear witnesses at its subsequent meeting in November. Fact-finding, especially on-location, is rare in ECHR cases compared to other international courts, such as the Inter-American Court of Human Rights.

== Investigation ==
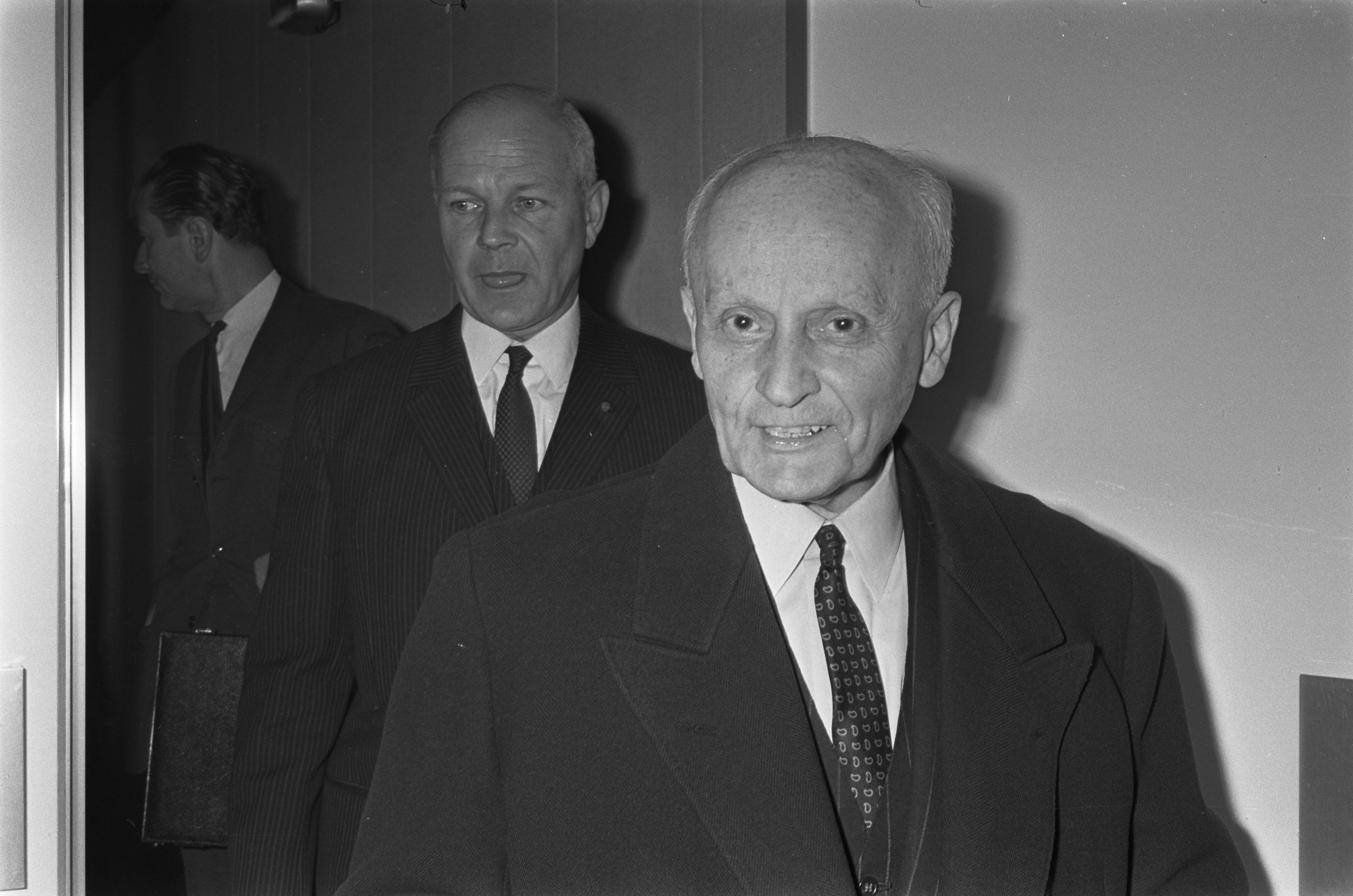
Foreign Minister of Greece, Panagiotis Pipinelis (right), at Schiphol Airport with representatives of the Dutch Ministry of Foreign Affairs, 16 April 1968

Greece outwardly cooperated with the investigation, but requested a delay at each step of the process, which was always granted. Foreign Minister Panagiotis Pipinelis tried to create the impression in the Committee of Ministers, which had all the decision-making power in the Council of Europe, that Greece was willing to change. He calculated that Western countries could be persuaded to overlook Greece's human rights violations, and that leaving the Council of Europe would only redouble the international pressure against the junta. Pipinelis, a conservative monarchist, tried to use the case as leverage against more hardline elements of the junta for his preferred political solution: the return of King Constantine and elections in 1971. The Greek government tried to hire international lawyers for its defense, but all refused to represent the country. Many Greek lawyers also refused, but Basil Vitsaksis agreed and for his performance was rewarded with an appointment as ambassador to the United States in 1969.

Hearings with witnesses were held in the last week of November 1968. Although its proceedings were in camera (closed), the Commission's proceedings were frequently leaked and journalists reported on its proceedings. The Greek government did not allow any hostile witnesses to leave the country, so the Scandinavians recruited Greek exiles to testify. During the hearings, two Greek witnesses brought by the junta escaped and fled to the Norwegian delegation, seeking asylum. They said they had been tortured, and their families in Greece were under threat. Although the junta struck them off the list of witnesses, they were allowed to testify as witnesses for the Commission. One of them did so; the other claimed to have been kidnapped by the head of the Norwegian delegation, Jens Evensen, and returned to Athens without testifying.

The Subcommission announced that it would begin its investigation in Greece on 6 February 1969 (later postponed to 9 March at the request of the Greek government), using its power to investigate alleged violations in member countries. Article 28 of the ECHR requires member states "furnish all necessary facilities" to carry out an investigation. Its interviews were held without representatives of either Greece or the applicant governments present, after wanted posters were put out in Greece for Evensen's arrest and because of fears that the presence of Greek officials would intimidate witnesses. Although it allowed some witnesses to testify to the Subcommission, the Greek government obstructed the investigation and prevented it from accessing some witnesses who had physical injuries, allegedly from torture. Because of this obstruction (and in particular because they were not allowed to visit Leros or Averoff Prison, where political prisoners were held) the Subcommission discontinued its visit.

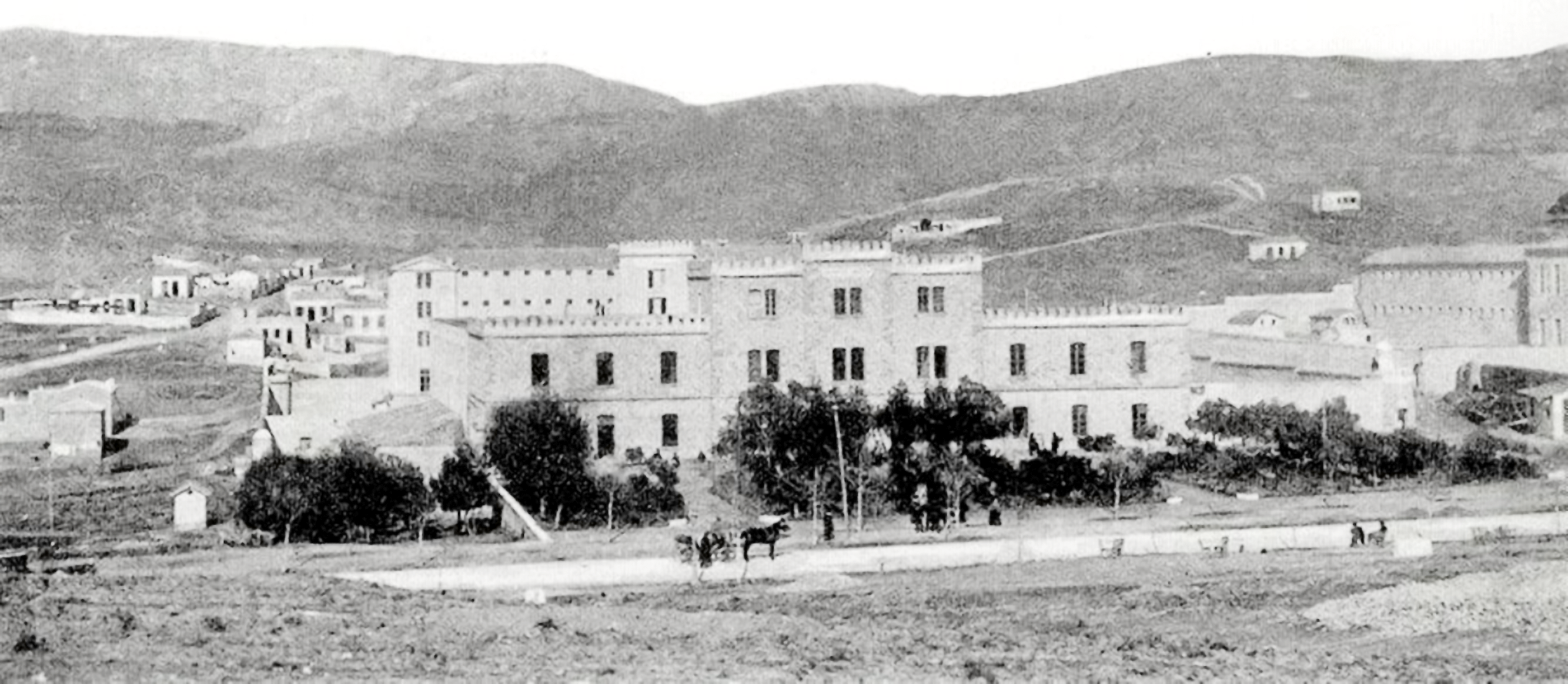
Averoff Prison, a prison in Athens investigated by the Subcommission, pictured c. 1895

After the obstructed visit, the Subcommission refused all requests for delays and the Greek party retaliated by not filing the required paperwork. By this time, more torture victims had escaped from Greece and several testified at hearings in June and July, without the presence of either party. The Subcommission heard from 88 witnesses, collected many documents (some sent clandestinely from Greece) and amassed over 20,000 pages of proceedings. Among those who gave evidence to the Subcommission were prominent journalists, ministers from the last democratically elected government, including former Prime Minister Panagiotis Kanellopoulos, and military officers such as Konstantinos Engolfopoulos, former Chief of the Hellenic Navy General Staff. Those who told the Subcommission they had suffered brutality in jail included Nikos Konstantopoulos, then a student, and Professors Sakis Karagiorgas and Georgios Mangakis. Amnesty investigators Marreco, Becket, and Dennis Geoghegan gave evidence and the junta sent hand-picked witnesses to testify.

== Friendly settlement attempt ==
As the investigation was concluding, the Subcommission requested closing remarks from both parties and tried to achieve a friendly settlement (mutual agreement to resolve the identified violations) as required by Article 28(b); talks began to this effect in March 1969. The Scandinavian countries thought no friendly settlement was possible because torture was forbidden and non-negotiable. The Greek government proposed unannounced visits by the International Committee of the Red Cross. The Scandinavian parties also wanted a deadline for free elections, but the Greek government was unwilling to fix a date for parliamentary elections. Because of these differences, a friendly settlement was impossible, and the matter was forwarded to the full Commission.

== Findings ==
On 4 October, the Subcommission adopted its final report and forwarded it to the full Commission, which adopted it on 5 November. Most of the report's more than 1,200 pages dealt with Articles 3 and 15. The report contained three sections: "History of the Proceedings and Points at Issue", "Establishment of the Facts and Opinion of the Commission" (the bulk of the report), and a shorter section explaining the failed attempt to come to a "Friendly Settlement". The report was widely praised for its objectivity and rigorous standard of evidence. Relying on direct evidence, the report did not cite the findings of third parties, such as the Red Cross or the reports of the rapporteurs for the Council of Europe's political branch. Becket stated that he found it "difficult to imagine how the Commission could have been more thorough in their investigation of the cases [of torture victims] they chose". He found the report to be "a signal achievement ... judicial in tone, objective in its conclusions, [it dealt] systematically and completely with the issues before the Commission". Legal expert A. H. Robertson noted that "the Commission required corroboration of the allegations made, offered the government every opportunity to rebut the evidence produced and even examined the possibility that (as alleged) many of the accounts of torture were deliberately fabricated as part of a plot to discredit the government".

The Commission also found that Greece had infringed Articles 3, 5, 6, 8, 9, 10, 11, 13, and 14 as well as Article 3 of Protocol 1. For Article 7 of the Convention and Article 1 of Protocol 1, the Commission found no violation. The report made ten proposals for remedying the human rights violations in Greece; the first eight dealt with conditions of detention, control of police and independence of the judiciary while the last two recommended allowing a free press and free elections. With these suggestions, Commissioner Sørensen later recalled, the Commission hoped to convince Greece to promise the Committee of Ministers to restore democracy—the original primary aim of the case, according to Sørensen.

=== Article 3 ===
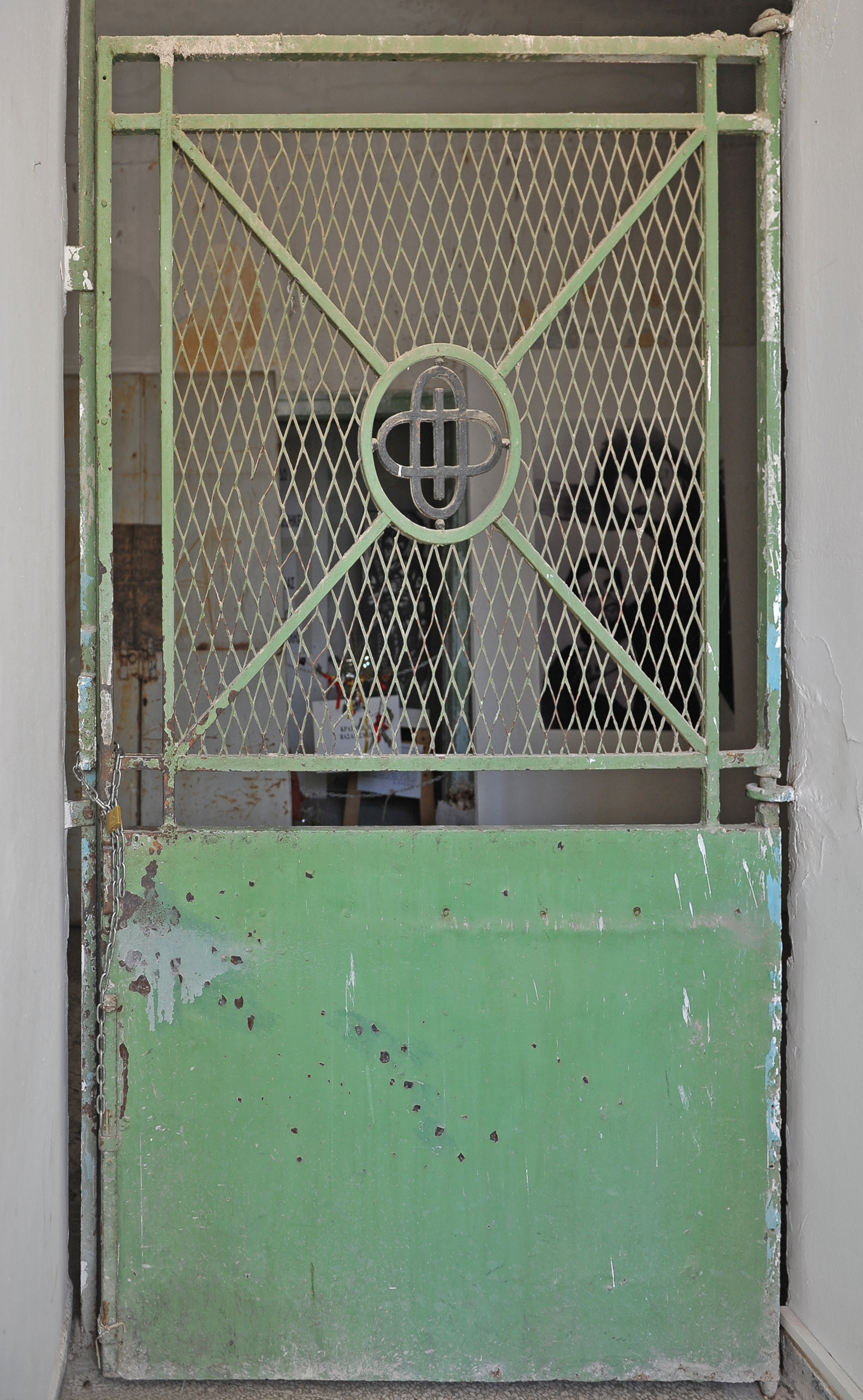
The cell of Spyros Moustaklis in the Greek Military Police building. As a result of torture, Moustaklis was left mute and partially paralyzed.

The report devotes over 300 pages to Article 3, examining 30 cases of alleged torture to the standard of proof required in individual applications, based on the testimony of 58 witnesses. (Note: The 58 witnesses were: "16 alleged victims of physical ill-treatment or torture; 7 persons who had been detained together with those alleged victims; 25 police officers and other Greek officials; 2 political prisoners with regard to whom no torture allegations were made but who had been proposed by the respondent Government (Zervoulakos and Tambakis); 8 other persons who had made observations concerning the treatment of political prisoners in Greece."; The Subcommission was refused access to another 21 witnesses in Greece.) An annex to the report lists the names of 213 people alleged to have been tortured or otherwise ill-treated, and five who were said to have died from their injuries; more than 70 of these cases involved abuse by the Security Police in their headquarters on Bouboulinas Street in Athens. Rigorous local fact-finding was key to the report's findings and authority regarding Article 3. Legal scholar Isabella Risini writes that, while the report has a dispassionate tone, "The horrific methods of torture and ill-treatment as well as the suffering of individuals at the hands of their tormentors emerge clearly." Commissioner Philip O'Donoghue later stated that, "The value of hearing evidence in a local venue cannot be overestimated ... No written description, however colorful, could have been as informative as the visit to Bouboulinas Street in Athens."

Of the 30 cases, sixteen were fully investigated, and eleven of these could be proved beyond a reasonable doubt. The remaining seventeen cases were blocked by Greek obstruction; of these cases, two had "indications" of torture, seven were "prima facie cases", and eight had "strong indications" of torture. The most common form of torture was falanga—the beating of the soles of the feet, which Greek police practiced on chairs or benches, with or without shoes. Other forms of torture included generalized beatings, electric shocks, blows to the male genitalia, dripping water onto the head, mock executions, and threats to kill the victims. The Commission also considered psychological and mental torture, and poor conditions of imprisonment. According to the Commission, overcrowding, uncleanliness, lack of adequate sleeping arrangements, and the severance of contact with the outside world were also inhuman treatment.

The purpose of torture, according to the report, was "the extraction of information including confessions concerning the political activities and association of the victims and other persons considered to be subversive". Despite numerous substantiated cases of torture reported to the authorities, the authorities had made no effort to investigate, stop the practice, or punish those responsible. Because the torture met both "repetition" and "official tolerance" criteria, the Commission determined that the Greek government systematically practiced torture. The Commission was the first international human rights body to find that a state practiced torture as government policy.

=== Article 5 ===
The Subcommission documented instances in which citizens had been deprived of their liberty, for example, by being deported from Greece, subjected to internal exile to islands or remote villages where they were forbidden to speak with locals and required to report to police twice daily, or subjected to police supervision. Considering Article 5 in conjunction with Article 15, the Commission found that the Greek government had unjustly restrained liberty with some of these measures, which violated the ECHR because they were excessive and disproportionate to the alleged emergency, and because they were not imposed by a court. The Commission did not consider the permissibility of internal exile, travel restrictions, or confiscation of passports under Article 5, nor did it offer a clear definition of "deprivation of liberty". According to Jeffrey Agrest, writing in Social Research, the previous Greek Constitution may not have been in compliance with Article 5 as interpreted by the Commission, because it allowed detention without trial, charges, or appeal for a certain duration, after which the authorities had to bring charges or release the suspect. (The time limit on such extrajudicial detention was abolished by Royal Decree 280.) This question was not examined by the Commission.

=== Article 15 ===
The fact that the respondent Government, having had full access to all available information, whether published, official or secret, has been able to produce only the very slender evidence already discussed, itself demonstrates that no Communist take-over of government by force of arms was to be anticipated.

—European Commission of Human Rights

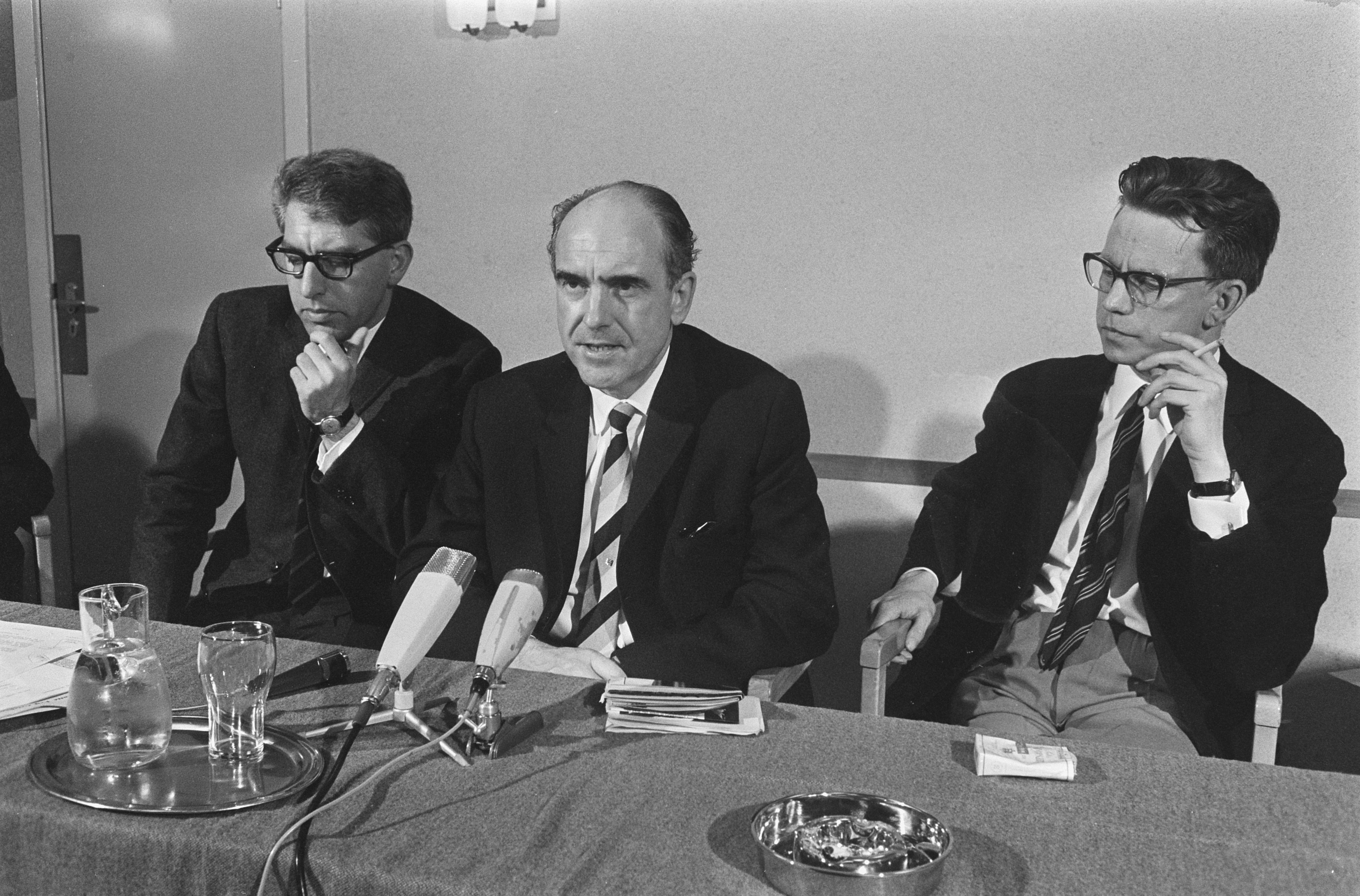
Exiled Greek opposition leader Andreas Papandreou (center) at a press conference in Amsterdam, 24 April 1968

The Subcommission heard 30 witnesses and also examined relevant documents, such as the manifestos of far-left parties, related to the dispute over whether Article 15 was applicable. The Greek government claimed that the United Democratic Left (EDA), alleged to have Communist tendencies, was forming a popular front and infiltrating youth organizations to seize power. The applicant governments retorted that if the EDA was in fact a danger to democracy, its power could be circumscribed by constitutional means, and it had been losing support in previous elections and becoming increasingly politically isolated. After examining the evidence, the Subcommission concluded the Greek communists had given up in their attempt to seize power by force and lacked the means to do so, while the popular front scenario was implausible. Further, the rapid and effective suppression of junta opponents after the coup was evidence the Communists were "incapable of any organised action in a crisis".

The Greek government also alleged that a "crisis of institutions" due to political mismanagement made the coup necessary; the applicant countries stated that "disapproval of the programme of certain political parties, namely the Centre Union and the EDA, did not of itself entitle the respondent Government to derogate from the Convention under Article 15". The Subcommission found that, contrary to the claims of their opponents, the Center Union politicians Georgios and Andreas Papandreou were committed to democratic and constitutional government. The Subcommission also rejected the junta's argument that demonstrations and strikes justified the coup, as these disruptions to public order were not more severe in Greece than other European countries and did not rise to a level of danger such as to justify derogation. Although the Subcommission found that before the coup there had been an increase of "political instability and tension, of an expansion of the activities of the Communists and their allies, and of some public disorder", it believed that the elections scheduled for May 1967 would have stabilized the political situation.

The Subcommission also investigated whether, even if an imminent danger justified the coup, the derogation could continue afterwards. The Greek government reported disorder that took place after the coup, including the formation of what it deemed to be illegal organizations and a series of bombings between September 1967 and March 1969. Some witnesses stated the repressive measures of the junta had exacerbated the disorder. Although it paid close attention to the bombings, the Subcommission found the authorities could control the situation using "normal measures".

The Greek government's justification for the existence of an "emergency" relied heavily on the Commission's judgement in Greece v. United Kingdom, in which the declaration of the British government that there was an emergency in British Cyprus was given significant weight. The Commission took a narrower view of the government's margin of appreciation to declare an emergency in the Greek case, by ruling that the burden of proof was on the government to prove the existence of an emergency that necessitated extraordinary measures. The Commission ruled 10–5 that Article 15 did not apply, either at the time of the coup or at a later date. Furthermore, the majority judged that Greece's derogation did not meet procedural requirements and that being a "revolutionary government" did not affect Greece's obligations under the Convention. The five dissenting opinions (Note: The dissenters were Pedro Delahaye (Belgium), Michalakis Triantafyllides (Cyprus), Constantin Eustathiades (Greece), Adolf Süsterhenn (Germany) and Edwin Busuttil (Malta). Although they dissented with the majority as to whether there was a genuine emergency as of 21 April 1967, Süsterhenn and Busuttil agreed with the majority that Article 15 derogation did not apply after the coup because the junta made no effort to reestablish a democratic and human-rights-respecting form of government.) were lengthy, indicating that for their authors this matter represented the crux of the case. Some of these opinions indicated agreement with the Greek government's reasoning that the coup countered an actual "serious danger threatening the life of the nation", and even agreed with the coup itself. Others argued that a "revolutionary government" had greater freedom to derogate from the Convention. Legal scholars Alexandre Charles Kiss and Phédon Végléris argue some of the dissenting opinions are effectively abstentions, which are not allowed under the Commission's rules. As of 2019, the Greek case is the only time in the history of the Commission or the Court that an invocation of Article 15 was deemed unjustified.

The applicant countries also argued that the derogation violated Articles 17 and 18, relating to abuse of rights, on the grounds that those articles "were designed to protect democratic regimes against totalitarian conspiracies", while the Greek regime did not act to protect rights and freedoms. The Commission did not rule on this question because the derogation was deemed invalid on other grounds, but a separate opinion by Felix Ermacora explicitly recognized that the Greek regime abused its rights.

=== Other articles ===
Imposing martial law, arbitrary suspension of judges and convictions of people for "acts directed against the national security and public order", were judged to constitute a violation of Article 6 (right to a fair trial). The Commission found no violation of Article 7 over the constitutional amendment of 11 July 1967, alleged to be ex post facto (retroactive) law, because it was not enforced. A violation was found for Article 8, as arrests were unnecessarily conducted at night in the absence of an actual emergency, disrupting family life. Articles 9 and 10, guaranteeing freedom of conscience and freedom of expression respectively, were deemed to have been violated by censorship of the press. For Article 11, which guarantees freedom of association, the Commission found that it had been violated as the restrictions were not "necessary in a democratic society". Instead, the restrictions indicated an attempt to create a "police state, which is the antithesis of a 'democratic society'". Article 13, the requirement to have a legal remedy for violations, was violated due to flaws in judicial independence and lack of investigations into credible allegations of torture. The authorities were judged to have violated Article 14 due to discrimination in the application of other rights such as freedom of expression.

The Commission found "a flagrant and persistent violation" of Article 3 of Protocol 1, which guaranteed the right to vote in elections, as "Article 3 of Protocol 1 implies the existence of a representative legislative body elected at reasonable intervals and constituting the basis of a democratic society". Because of the indefinite suspension of elections, "the Greek people are thus prevented from freely expressing their political opinion by choosing the legislative body in accordance with Article 3 of the said Protocol".

== Political processes ==
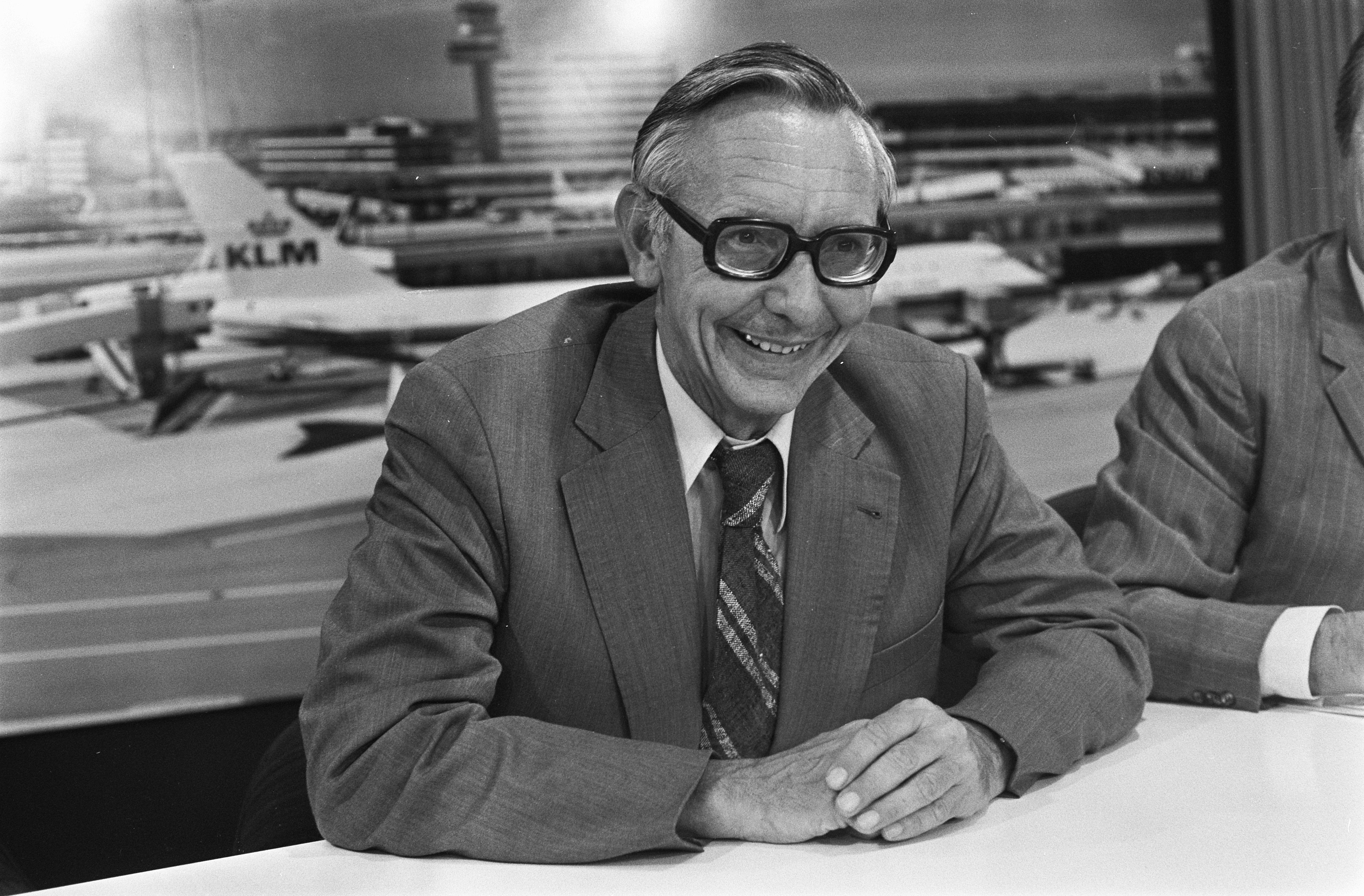
As Foreign Minister of the Netherlands, Max van der Stoel holds a press conference after returning from Greece, 1 September 1974

The case revealed divisions within the Council of Europe between smaller states that emphasized human rights and larger ones (including the United Kingdom, West Germany, and France) which prioritized keeping Greece within NATO as a Cold War ally against the Eastern Bloc. A key consideration was that the United States did not oppose the Greek junta and, throughout the case, intervened in favor of keeping Greece inside the Council of Europe. The larger Western European countries used the case to deflect domestic criticism of their relations with the junta and calls for Greece to be ejected from NATO.

Besides the judicial case, political processes against Greece in the Council of Europe had been ongoing in 1968 and 1969. In certain respects the process was similar to the Commission's procedure, because the Parliamentary Assembly appointed a rapporteur, Max van der Stoel, to visit the country and investigate the facts of the situation. The choice of Van der Stoel, a Dutch social-democratic politician, indicated the Assembly's hard line on Greece. Working from the findings of Amnesty International and Thornberry, he visited the country three times in 1968, but the junta barred him from returning because it claimed he lacked objectivity and impartiality. He found that, similar to Francoist Spain and the Estado Novo dictatorship in Portugal, which had been refused membership, it was "undeniable that the present Greek regime does not fulfill the objective conditions for membership in the Council of Europe as set out in Article 3 of the Statute". This was due in part to the lack of rule of law and protection of fundamental freedoms in Greece, and the lack of a parliament prevented Greece's participation in the Parliamentary Assembly.

Van der Stoel presented his report, which unlike the Commission's findings was not bound by confidentiality, with a recommendation of expulsion under Article 8 of the Statute, to the Parliamentary Assembly on 30 January 1969. As Van der Stoel emphasized, this was distinct from the Commission's work as he did not evaluate if the ECHR had been violated. Following debate, the Parliamentary Assembly passed Resolution 547 (92 for, 11 against, 20 abstentions) which recommended the expulsion of Greece from the Council of Europe. During its meeting on 6 May 1969, the Committee of Ministers resolved to bring Resolution 547 to the attention of the Greek government and scheduled a vote on the resolution for its next meeting on 12 December 1969. Late 1969 saw a scramble for votes on the expulsion of Greece; the junta publicly threatened an economic boycott of the countries that voted for the resolution. Out of eighteen countries, Sweden, Denmark, the Netherlands, Luxembourg, Iceland, Switzerland, and the United Kingdom had already signaled their intention to vote for Greece's expulsion before the 12 December meeting. The United Kingdom had had an ambiguous stance towards Greece, but on 7 December, Prime Minister Harold Wilson gave a speech in the House of Commons indicating that the government would vote against Greece.

== Greek exit ==
=== Leak of the report ===
Shortly after the Commission received the report, it was leaked. Summaries and excerpts were published in The Sunday Times on 18 November and Le Monde on 30 November. Extensive newspaper coverage publicized the finding that Greece had violated the ECHR and torture was an official policy of the Greek government. The report echoed the findings of other investigations by Amnesty International and the US Committee for Democracy in Greece. The reports made a strong impact on public opinion; demonstrations against the junta were held across Europe. On 7 December, Greece issued a note verbale to the Secretary-General of the Council of Europe denouncing the leak and accusing the Commission of irregularities and bias, which made the report "null and void" in Greece's opinion. Greece also claimed that the Commission leaked the report to influence the 12 December meeting. The Commission's Secretariat denied responsibility for the leak; Becket stated that it "came from Greece itself and constituted an act of resistance by Greeks against the regime", according to "well-informed sources". After the leak, British ambassador to Greece Michael Stewart advised Pipinelis that if the junta would not agree to a concrete timeline for democratization, it would be best to withdraw voluntarily from the Council of Europe.

=== 12 December meeting ===
On 12 December, the Committee of Ministers met in Paris. Because its rules forbade a vote on the report until it had been in the Committee's hands for three months, the report, transmitted on 18 November 1969, was not discussed at their meeting. Pipinelis, the Greek Foreign Minister, gave a lengthy speech in which he discussed the causes of the 1967 coup, possible reforms in Greece, and the recommendations in the Commission's report. However, since his audience had copies of the Commission's report, and Pipinelis did not give a timeline for elections, his speech was not convincing. Eleven of the eighteen Council of Europe member states sponsored the resolution calling for Greece's expulsion; (Note: The states that sponsored the resolution were: Sweden, Norway, Denmark, Iceland, Netherlands, Luxembourg, Ireland, West Germany, the United Kingdom, Italy, and Belgium.) a resolution by Turkey, Cyprus, and France to delay the vote was unsuccessful. By this time, these states were the only ones opposing Greece's expulsion, and it became obvious that Greece would lose the vote.

Historian Effie Pedaliu suggests the United Kingdom's dropping its support for the junta in the Council process rattled Pipinelis, leading to his sudden reversal. After the president of the Committee, Italian foreign minister Aldo Moro suggested a break for lunch, Pipinelis demanded the floor. In a face-saving move, he announced that Greece was leaving the Council of Europe under Article 7 of the Statute, pursuant to the junta's instructions, and walked out. This had the effect of denouncing three treaties of which Greece was a party: the Statute, the ECHR, and Protocol 1 of the ECHR.

=== Aftermath ===
The Committee of Ministers passed a resolution stating that Greece had "seriously violated Article 3 of the Statute" and had withdrawn from the Council of Europe, rendering suspension unnecessary. On 17 December 1969, the Secretary-General released a note verbale rejecting Greece's allegations against the Commission. The Committee of Ministers adopted the report at its next meeting on 15 April. It stated the "Greek government is not prepared to comply with its continuing obligations under the Convention", noting ongoing violations. Therefore, the report would be made public and the "Government of Greece [was urged] to restore without delay, human rights and fundamental freedoms in Greece" and abolish torture immediately. As Moro stated at the 12 December meeting, in practice Greece immediately ceased to be a member of the Council of Europe. The country announced on 19 February 1970 that it would not participate in the Committee of Ministers as it no longer considered itself a member. Pursuant to Article 65 of the ECHR, Greece ceased to be a party of the ECHR after six months, on 13 June 1970, and de jure left the Council of Europe on 31 December 1970.

Pipinelis later told U.S. Secretary of State William Rogers that he regretted the withdrawal, as it furthered Greece's international isolation and led to more pressure against the junta at NATO. (Note: In 1970, the United States blocked the suggestion by Norway, Denmark and the Netherlands that NATO sanctions should be applied against Greece.) Greek dictator Georgios Papadopoulos issued a statement calling the Commission "a conspiracy of homosexuals and communists against Hellenic values", and declaring, "We warn our friends in the West: 'Hands off Greece'".

== Second case ==
On 10 April 1970, Denmark, Norway and Sweden filed another application against Greece alleging violations of Articles 5 and 6 related to the ongoing trial of 34 regime opponents before the Extraordinary Military Tribunal of Athens, one of whom seemed likely to be executed. The applicant countries asked the Commission to intercede to prevent any executions from being carried out, a request that was granted. The Secretary-General of the Council of Europe submitted such a request at the behest of the Commission's president. Greece said the application was inadmissible because it had denounced the Convention, and domestic remedies had not been exhausted. The Commission ruled the application provisionally admissible on 26 May, a decision that became final on 16 July as Greece responded to queries. Greece's reasoning was rejected because its withdrawal from the ECHR did not take effect until 13 June and violations that occurred before that date remained subject to Convention jurisdiction. Also, exhaustion of domestic remedies did not apply because the violations related to "administrative practices". On 5 October, the Commission decided it could not decide the facts of the case because Greece's refusal to cooperate in the proceedings made it impossible for the Commission to carry out its usual functions. None of the defendants in the trial were executed, although it is unclear if the intervention affected the proceedings in Greece. Following the fall of the junta on 23 July 1974, Greece rejoined the Council of Europe on 28 November 1974. At the request of Greece and the three applicant countries, the case was struck in July 1976.

== Efficacy and results ==
The report was hailed as a great achievement for exposing human rights violations in a document of substantial authority and credibility. Pedaliu argues that the case helped break down the concept of non-intervention over human rights violations. The process triggered extensive press coverage for nearly two years, increasing awareness of the situation in Greece and of the ECHR. Council of Europe Commissioner for Human Rights Thomas Hammarberg stated that, "The Greek case became a defining lesson for human rights policies in Europe." He argued the expulsion of Greece from the Council of Europe had "an influence and a great moral significance for many Greeks". The case led to development in the forensics of torture and a focus on developing techniques that could prove that torture had occurred. The case enhanced the prestige and influence of Amnesty International and similar organizations, and caused the Red Cross to reexamine its policies regarding torture.

The case revealed the weakness of the Convention system as it existed in the late 1960s, because "on its own the Convention system was ultimately unable to prevent the establishment of a totalitarian regime", the main purpose of those who had proposed it in 1950. Unlike other Convention cases at the time, but similar to Ireland v. United Kingdom (a case charging mistreatment of Irish republican prisoners in Northern Ireland), it was an interstate case alleging systematic and deliberate human rights violations by a member state. The Commission, which had only moral power, dealt best with individual cases and when the responsible state cared about its reputation and therefore had an incentive to cooperate. Other cases involved minor deviations from a norm of protecting human rights; in contrast, the junta's premises were antithetical to the principles of the ECHR—something the Greek government did not deny. The lack of results led legal scholar Georgia Bechlivanou to conclude there was "a total lack of effectiveness of the Convention, whether direct or indirect". Changing a government responsible for systematic violations is outside the ECHR system's remit.

Israeli law scholar Shai Dothan believes that the Council of Europe institutions created a double standard by dealing much more harshly with Greece than with Ireland in Lawless (1961). Because Greece had a very low reputation for human rights protection, its exit did not weaken the system. Instead, the Greek case paradoxically increased the prestige of the Commission and strengthened the Convention system by isolating and stigmatizing a state responsible for serious human rights violations.

Commissioner Sørensen believed the Committee of Ministers' actions had resulted in a "lost opportunity" by playing the threat of expulsion too soon and closed off the possibility of a solution under Article 32 and the Commission's recommendations. He argued that Greece's economic dependence on the EC and its military dependence on the United States could have been leveraged to bring the regime around, which was impossible once Greece left the Council of Europe. Although conceding the report was a "pyrrhic victory", Pedaliu argues that Sørensen's view fails to appreciate the fact that the Greek regime was never willing to curtail its human rights violations. The case stripped the junta of international legitimacy and contributed to Greece's increasing international isolation. Such isolation may have contributed to the junta's difficulties in effective government; it was unable to respond to the Turkish invasion of Cyprus, which caused the junta's sudden collapse in 1974. Human rights lawyer Scott Leckie argues that the international scrutiny of human rights in Greece helped the country to transition more rapidly to democracy. Greece's denunciation was the first time a regional convention on human rights was denounced by one of its members. In 2022, Russia became the second country to leave the Council of Europe, prior to a vote over its expulsion for its invasion of Ukraine.

Becket found that "there is no doubt that the Convention System process was a significant restraint on the behaviour of the Greek authorities" and that because of international scrutiny, fewer people were tortured than would have been otherwise. On 5 November 1969, Greece signed an agreement with the Red Cross in an attempt to prove its intention to reform, although the agreement was not renewed in 1971. The agreement was significant as no similar agreement had been signed by a sovereign country with the Red Cross outside of war; torture and mistreatment declined following the agreement. International pressure also prevented retaliation against witnesses in the case. Becket also considered that Greece had made an incompetent blunder to defend itself when it was clearly in the wrong, and could have quietly left the Council of Europe.

The definition of torture used in the Greek case significantly impacted the United Nations Declaration against Torture (1975) and the United Nations Convention against Torture (1984). It also led to another Council of Europe initiative against torture, the Convention for the Prevention of Torture and Inhuman or Degrading Treatment and Punishment (1987), which created the Committee for the Prevention of Torture. The Greek case also triggered the Conference on Security and Co-operation in Europe, which led to the Helsinki Accords. In 1998, George Papandreou, the Greek foreign minister, thanked "all those, both within the Council [of Europe] and without, who supported the struggle for the return of democracy to the country of its origin".

== Effect on ECHR jurisprudence ==
The Greek case was the first time the Commission formally found a violation of the ECHR, and its conclusions were influential precedents in later cases. In terms of admissibility under Article 26, the Commission decided that it did not just consider the formal existence of legal remedies but whether they were actually effective in practice, including consideration of whether the judiciary was actually independent and impartial. Building on Lawless v. Ireland, the case helped to define the circumstances that might qualify as "a public emergency threatening the life of the nation" under Article 15, although leaving open the question, unresolved as of 2018, whether successful coup plotters may derogate rights based on an emergency resulting from their own actions. (Note: In a dissenting opinion, Felix Ermacora (Austria) argued the Greek government could not rely on Article 15 because "the present situation in Greece is caused by the respondent Government".) According to Jeffrey Agrest, the most significant point of law established by the case was its interpretation of Article 15, as the judgement prevented the use of the article as an escape clause. The case also illustrated the limits to the margin of appreciation doctrine; the suspension of all constitutional rule of law was manifestly outside the margin.

During the 1950s and 1960s, there was no definition of what constituted torture or inhuman and degrading treatment under Article 3 of the ECHR. The Greek case was the first time the Commission had considered Article 3. In the Greek case, the Commission stated that all torture was inhuman treatment, and all inhuman treatment was degrading. It found that torture was "an aggravated form of inhuman treatment" distinguished by the fact that torture "has a purpose, such as the obtaining of information or confessions, or the infliction of punishment", rather than the severity of the act. However, the purposeful aspect was marginalized in later cases, which considered that torture was objectively more severe than acts which amounted only to inhuman or degrading treatment. In the Greek case report, the Commission ruled that the prohibition on torture was absolute. The Commission did not specify whether inhuman and degrading treatment was also absolutely prohibited, and seemed to imply they may not be, with the wording "in the particular situation is unjustifiable". This wording gave rise to a concern that inhuman and degrading treatment could be sometimes justified, but in Ireland v. United Kingdom the Commission found that inhuman and degrading treatment was also absolutely prohibited.

A threshold of severity distinguished "inhuman treatment" and "degrading treatment". The former was defined as "at least such treatment as deliberately causes severe suffering, mental or physical which, in the particular situation is unjustifiable" and the latter, that which "grossly humiliates the victim before others, or drives him to an act against his will or conscience". Among the implications of the Greek Case report is that poor conditions are more likely to be found to be inhuman or degrading if they are applied to political prisoners. The Commission reused its definitions from the Greek case in Ireland v. United Kingdom. The case also clarified that the Commission's standard of proof was beyond a reasonable doubt, a decision which left an asymmetry between the victim and state authorities, who could prevent the victim from collecting the evidence necessary to prove they had suffered a violation. The Court ruled in later cases where Article 3 violations seemed likely, it was incumbent upon the state to conduct an effective investigation into alleged ill-treatment. It also helped to define what constituted an "administrative practice" of systematic violations.

== Sources ==
=== Books ===
- Bates, Ed (2010). The Evolution of the European Convention on Human Rights: From Its Inception to the Creation of a Permanent Court of Human Rights. Oxford University Press. ISBN 978-0-19-920799-2.
- Bechlivanou, Georgia (1991). "Greece". In Delmas-Marty, Mireille (ed.). The European Convention for the Protection of Human Rights: International Protection Versus National Restrictions. Martinus Nijhoff Publishers. pp. 151–. ISBN 978-0-7923-1283-3.
- Clark, Ann Marie (2010). Diplomacy of Conscience: Amnesty International and Changing Human Rights Norms. Princeton University Press. ISBN 978-1-4008-2422-9.
- de Morree, Paulien (2016). Rights and Wrongs Under the ECHR: The Prohibition of Abuse of Rights in Article 17 of the European Convention on Human Rights. Intersentia. ISBN 978-1-78068-418-5.
- Dickson, Brice (2010). The European Convention on Human Rights and the Conflict in Northern Ireland. Oxford University Press. ISBN 978-0-19-957138-3.
- Dothan, Shai (2014). Reputation and Judicial Tactics: A Theory of National and International Courts. Cambridge University Press. ISBN 978-1-107-03113-5.
- Ingelse, Chris (2007). United Nations Committee Against Torture: An Assessment. Martinus Nijhoff Publishers. ISBN 978-90-411-1650-5.
- Janis, Mark W.; Kay, Richard S.; Bradley, Anthony Wilfred (2008). "Strasbourg's Legal Machinery". European Human Rights Law: Text and Materials. Oxford University Press. pp. 24–68. ISBN 978-0-19-927746-9.
- Long, Debra (2002). Guide to Jurisprudence on Torture and Ill-treatment: Article 3 of the European Convention for the Protection of Human Rights (PDF). Association for the Prevention of Torture. ISBN 978-2-9700214-3-8.
- Madsen, Mikael Rask (2019). "Resistance to the European Court of Human Rights: The Institutional and Sociological Consequences of Principled Resistance". Principled Resistance to ECtHR Judgments – A New Paradigm?. Springer. pp. 35–52. ISBN 978-3-662-58986-1.
- Maragkou, Konstantina (2020). Britain, Greece and The Colonels, 1967–74: A Troubled Relationship. Oxford University Press. ISBN 978-1-78738-373-9.
- Nalbadidacis, Janis (2020). "Laboratories of the Conditio Humana: The Role of Communism in Greek and Argentine Torture Centers During Their Last Military Dictatorships". The Palgrave Handbook of Anti-Communist Persecutions. Springer International Publishing. pp. 97–116. ISBN 978-3-030-54963-3.
- Pedaliu, Effie G. H. (2020). "A clash of cultures? The UN, the Council of Europe and the Greek dictators". In Klapsis, Antonis; Arvanitopoulos, Constantine; Hatzivassiliou, Evanthis; Pedaliu, Effie G. H. (eds.). The Greek Junta and the International System: A Case Study of Southern European Dictatorships, 1967–74. Routledge. ISBN 978-0-429-79776-7.
- Reidy, Aisling (2003). The Prohibition of Torture: A Guide to the Implementation of Article 3 of the European Convention on Human Rights. Human rights handbooks. Vol. 6. Council of Europe. OCLC 931979772.
- Risini, Isabella (2018). The Inter-State Application under the European Convention on Human Rights: Between Collective Enforcement of Human Rights and International Dispute Settlement. Brill. ISBN 978-90-04-35726-6.
- Sikkink, Kathryn (2011). The Justice Cascade: How Human Rights Prosecutions Are Changing World Politics. The Norton Series in World Politics. W. W. Norton & Company. ISBN 978-0-393-08328-6.
- The European Commission and European Court of Human Rights (1972). The Greek Case, 1969. Yearbook of the European Convention on Human Rights. Martinus Nijhoff Publishers. ISBN 978-94-015-1226-8.
- Walldorf, C. William (2011). Just Politics: Human Rights and the Foreign Policy of Great Powers. Cornell University Press. ISBN 978-0-8014-5963-4.
- Yourow, Howard Charles (1996). "Greek Colonels Case: Derogation Disallowed". The Margin of Appreciation Doctrine in the Dynamics of European Human Rights Jurisprudence. Martinus Nijhoff Publishers. pp. 18–19. ISBN 978-0-7923-3338-8.

=== Journal articles ===
- Addo, Michael K.; Grief, Nicholas (1998). "Does Article 3 of The European Convention on Human Rights Enshrine Absolute Rights?". European Journal of International Law. 9 (3): 510–524. doi:10.1093/ejil/9.3.510.
- Agrest, Jeffrey (1971). "Human Rights and Preventive Detention: the Greek Case". Social Research. 38 (2): 298–319. ISSN 0037-783X. JSTOR 40970063.
- Becket, James (1970). "The Greek Case Before the European Human Rights Commission". Human Rights. 1 (1): 91–117. ISSN 0046-8185. JSTOR 27878926.
- Buergenthal, Thomas (1968). "Proceedings against Greece under The European Convention of Human Rights". American Journal of International Law. 62 (2): 441–450. doi:10.1017/S0002930000102003. S2CID 151325962.
- Coleman, Howard D. (1972). "Greece and the Council of Europe: The international legal protection of human rights by the political process". Israeli Yearbook of Human Rights (2). Martinus Nijhoff Publishers: 121–141. ISBN 0792303520. OCLC 1078033270.
- Doswald-Beck, Louise (1978). "What does the Prohibition of "Torture or Inhuman or Degrading Treatment or Punishment" Mean? the Interpretation of the European Commission and Court of Human Rights". Netherlands International Law Review. 25 (1): 24–. doi:10.1017/S0165070X00015060.
- Ergec, Rusen (2015). "À Propos de "Les Organes du Conseil de l'Europe et le Concept de Démocratie dans le Cadre de Deux Affaires Grecques" de Pierre Mertens: Le Conseil de l'Europe et la Démocratie dans les Circonstances Exceptionnelles". Revue belge de Droit international (in French) (1–2): 204–217. ISSN 2566-1906.
- Fernández Soriano, Víctor (2017). "Facing the Greek junta: the European Community, the Council of Europe and the rise of human-rights politics in Europe". European Review of History: Revue européenne d'histoire. 24 (3): 358–376. doi:10.1080/13507486.2017.1282432. S2CID 217534461.
- Heri, Corina (2020). "Loyalty, Subsidiarity, and Article 18 ECHR: How the ECtHR Deals with Mala Fide Limitations of Rights". European Convention on Human Rights Law Review. 1 (1): 25–61. doi:10.1163/26663236-00101001. hdl:11245.1/97ecfe24-274c-4aec-914a-3659ae840c28. ISSN 2666-3228.
- Kiss, Alexandre Charles; Végléris, Phédon (1971). "L'affaire grecque devant le Conseil de l'Europe et la Commission européenne des Droits de l'homme" [The Greek case before the Council of Europe and the European Commission of Human Rights]. Annuaire Français de Droit International (in French). 17 (1): 889–931. doi:10.3406/afdi.1971.1677.
- Leckie, Scott (1988). "The Inter-State Complaint Procedure in International Human Rights Law: Hopeful Prospects or Wishful Thinking?". Human Rights Quarterly. 10 (2): 249–303. doi:10.2307/762144. ISSN 0275-0392. JSTOR 762144.
- Mariniello, Triestino (2019). "Prolonged emergency and derogation of human rights: Why the European Court should raise its immunity system". German Law Journal. 20 (1): 46–71. doi:10.1017/glj.2019.3.
- Mertens, Pierre (1971). "Les organes du Conseil de l'Europe et le concept de démocratie dans le cadre des deux affaires grecques" [The organs of the Council of Europe and the concept of democracy in the context of the two Greek cases] (PDF). Revue belge de Droit international (in French) (1): 118–147. ISSN 2566-1906. Archived from the original (PDF) on 18 June 2021.
- Nugraha, Ignatius Yordan (2018). "Human rights derogation during coup situations". The International Journal of Human Rights. 22 (2): 194–206. doi:10.1080/13642987.2017.1359551. hdl:1854/LU-8616103.
- Pedaliu, Effie G. H. (2016). "Human Rights and International Security: The International Community and the Greek Dictators". The International History Review. 38 (5): 1014–1039. doi:10.1080/07075332.2016.1141308. S2CID 155986136.
- Stelakatos-Loverdos, Michalis K. (1999). « ελληνική υπόθεση» στο Συμβούλιο της Ευρώπης: Η διεθνής προστασία των ανθρωπίνων δικαιωμάτων στην Ελλάδα μετά την 21 η Απριλίου 1967 ως αντικείμενο διεθνούς διαφοράς [The "Greek case" in the Council of Europe: The international protection of human rights in Greece after 21 April 1967 as an object of international dispute]. Ελληνική Επιθεώρηση Πολιτικής Επιστήμης (in Greek). 14: 117–139. doi:10.12681/hpsa.15163. ISSN 2585-3031.
- Turkut, Emre (2018). "Accommodating Security Imperatives v. Protecting Fundamental Rights". Security and Human Rights. 28 (1–4): 62–91. doi:10.1163/18750230-02801002. hdl:1854/LU-8611717.
- Tyagi, Yogesh (2009). "The Denunciation of Human Rights Treaties". British Yearbook of International Law. 79 (1): 86–193. doi:10.1093/bybil/79.1.86.
