= Admittance (disambiguation) =

Admittance may refer to:

- Admittance, a measure of how easily a circuit allows an electric current to flow
- Admittance (geophysics), the small effects of atmospheric pressure on gravity
- Thermal admittance, a measure of the ability of a material to transfer heat (see thermal conductivity)

== See also ==
- Admission (disambiguation)
