= E-meter =

Scientology device

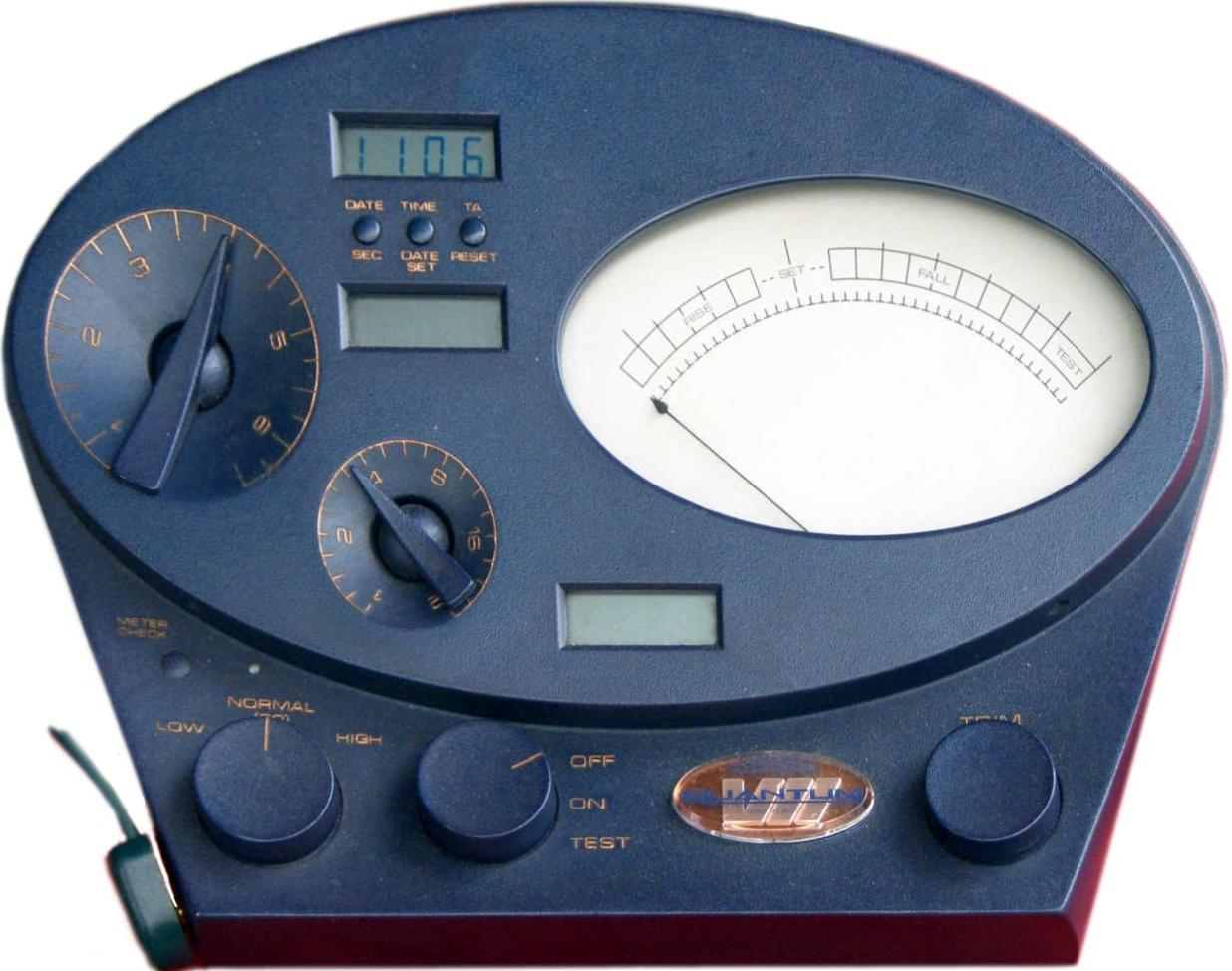
- A Scientology E-meter device
- Type: Instrument used in Scientology auditing
- Description: A device that measures changes in electrical resistance
- Role: To guide auditing sessions
- Key texts: E-meter technical and procedural manuals
- Associated controversies: Regulatory actions, medical claims, disputes over scientific validity

The E-meter (also electropsychometer and Hubbard Electrometer) is an electronic device used by the Church of Scientology during a counseling practice known as auditing. It consists of a low-voltage circuit, a pair of handheld electrodes, and an analog meter that displays changes in the electrical resistance of the subject's skin. Scientology teaches that needle movements on the meter's dial reflect changes in the subject's mental state, including helping identify which topics contain emotional or spiritual distress, and when a procedure is completed.

Outside Scientology, the device is regarded as a type of skin galvanometer that measures variations in skin resistance. It is not considered a scientific instrument, and its use and interpretation are not supported by evidence in psychology or medicine. The E-meter became the subject of legal and regulatory actions in the United States, most notably a 1963 Food and Drug Administration raid and subsequent court case that restricted its use to religious counseling and required specific labeling indicating it is not useful for the diagnosis, treatment or prevention of any disease.

== History ==
=== Mathison ===
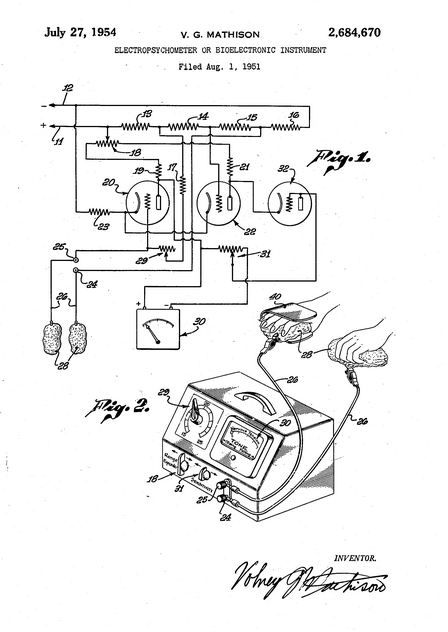
Illustration provided by Volney Mathison in the original 1951 patent application for the E-Meter, registered as U.S. patent 2,684,670

Volney Mathison built an Electrodermal activity meter based on a Wheatstone bridge, (Note: Quotation: "Technically it is a specially developed 'Wheatstone Bridge' well known to electrically minded people as a device to measure the amount of resistance to a flow of electricity." Reproduced and cited in The Kotzé Report, Section III, Chapter 8 § 8.7(b).) a vacuum tube amplifier, and a large moving-coil meter that projected an image of the needle on the wall. He patented his device in 1954 as an electropsychometer or E-meter, and it came to be known as the "Mathison Electropsychometer". In Mathison's words, the E-meter "has a needle that swings back and forth across a scale when a patient holds on to two electrical contacts". Mathison recorded in his book, Electropsychometry, that the idea of the E-Meter came to him in 1950 while listening to a lecture by L. Ron Hubbard:

In 1950 ... I next attended a series of lectures being given by a very controversial figure, who several times emphasized that perhaps the major problem of psychotherapy was the difficulty of maintaining the communication of accurate or valid data from the patient to the therapist.

and

it appeared to me that the psychogalvanometer showed most promise.

Hubbard told of that encounter in a 1952 recorded lecture:

This machine, the electropsychometer, has been acting as a pilot since about the first of January 1952. Very early I wanted a pilot; I had to have some method of metering preclears which was not dependent at all upon opinion or judgment. And I went out and looked at the existing lie detector equipment and I could not find anything which would do a job of work. Now, Volney Mathison out on the Coast heard a talk out there one day, and I mentioned this fact. ... I had one of the fanciest electroencephalographs made and it didn't do anything very much, police detectors didn't do anything very much, and Mathison went to work and he floated a current within a current. This machine is relatively simple, but it's a current floating inside another current ... And I am, by the way, very much indebted to Mathison just on this basis of all of a sudden having a pilot.

Mathison began working with L. Ron Hubbard in 1951 and that year filed application for his first E-meter patent, U.S. Patent 2,684,670. After the partnership broke up in 1954, Mathison continued improving his E-meters with additional patents (U.S. patent 2,736,313, U.S. patent 2,810,383), marketing them through his own company and publications, retaining many of the concepts and terms from his time with Hubbard.

=== Hubbard ===
Chronology of e-meter models
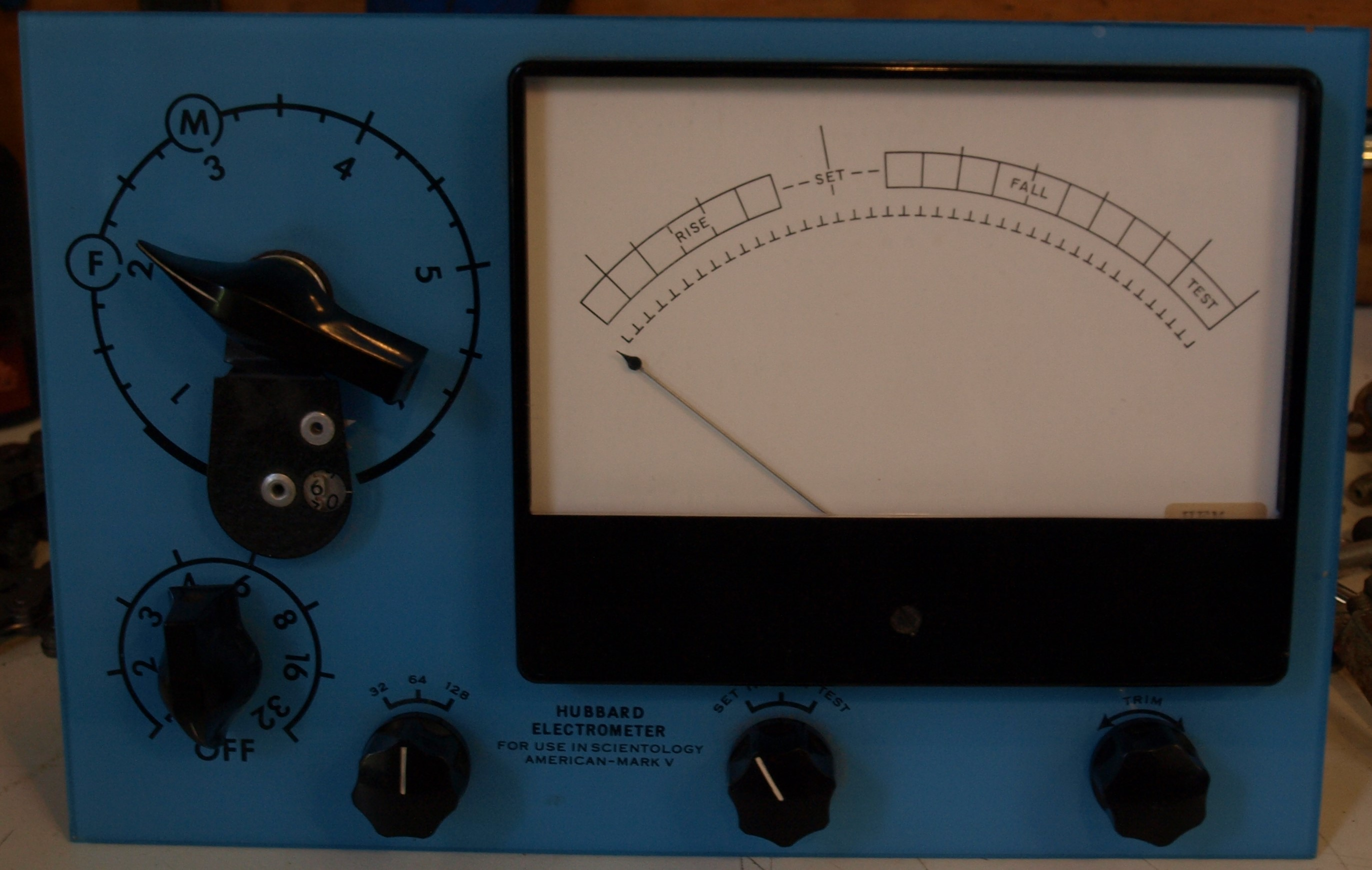
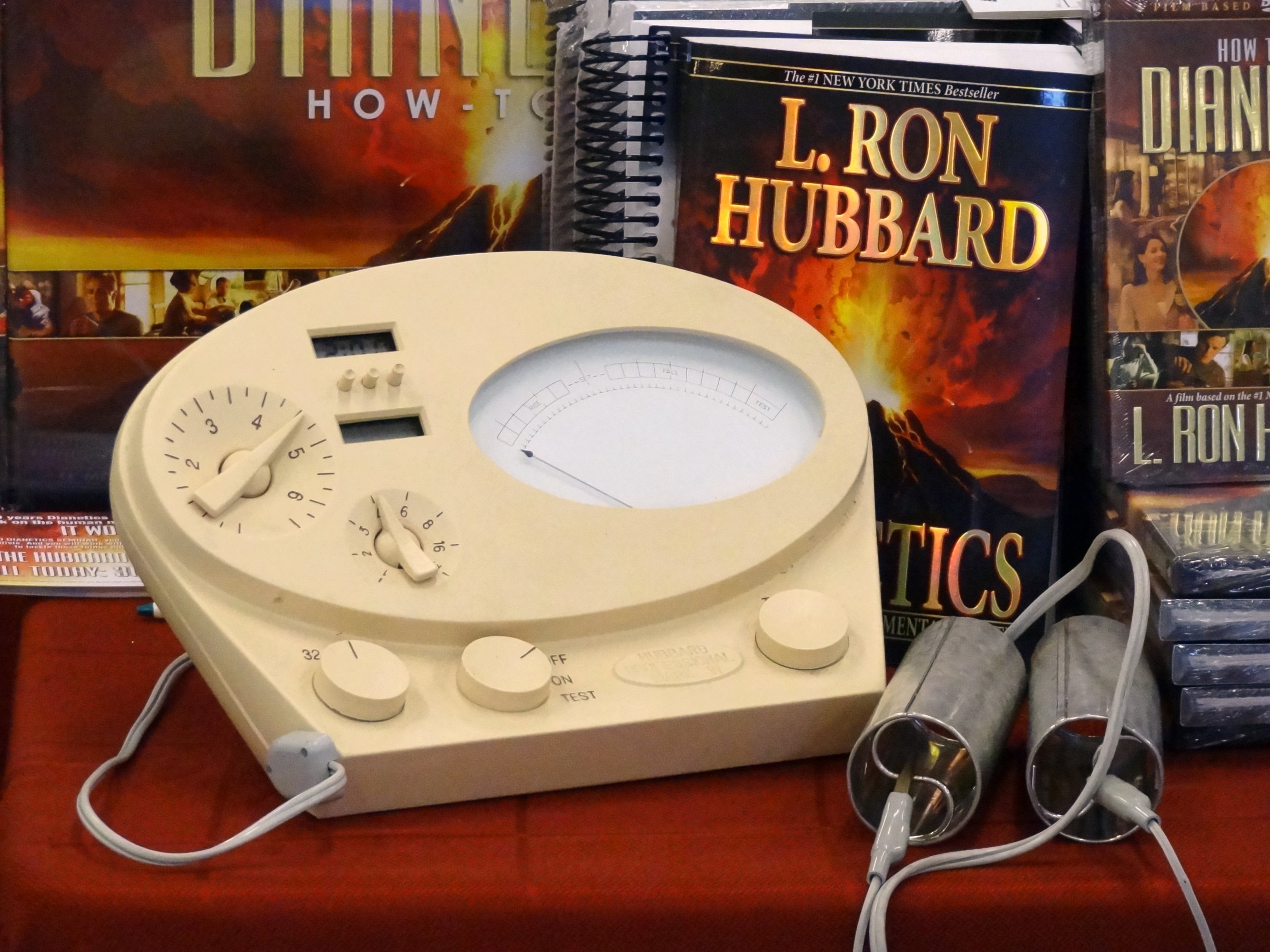
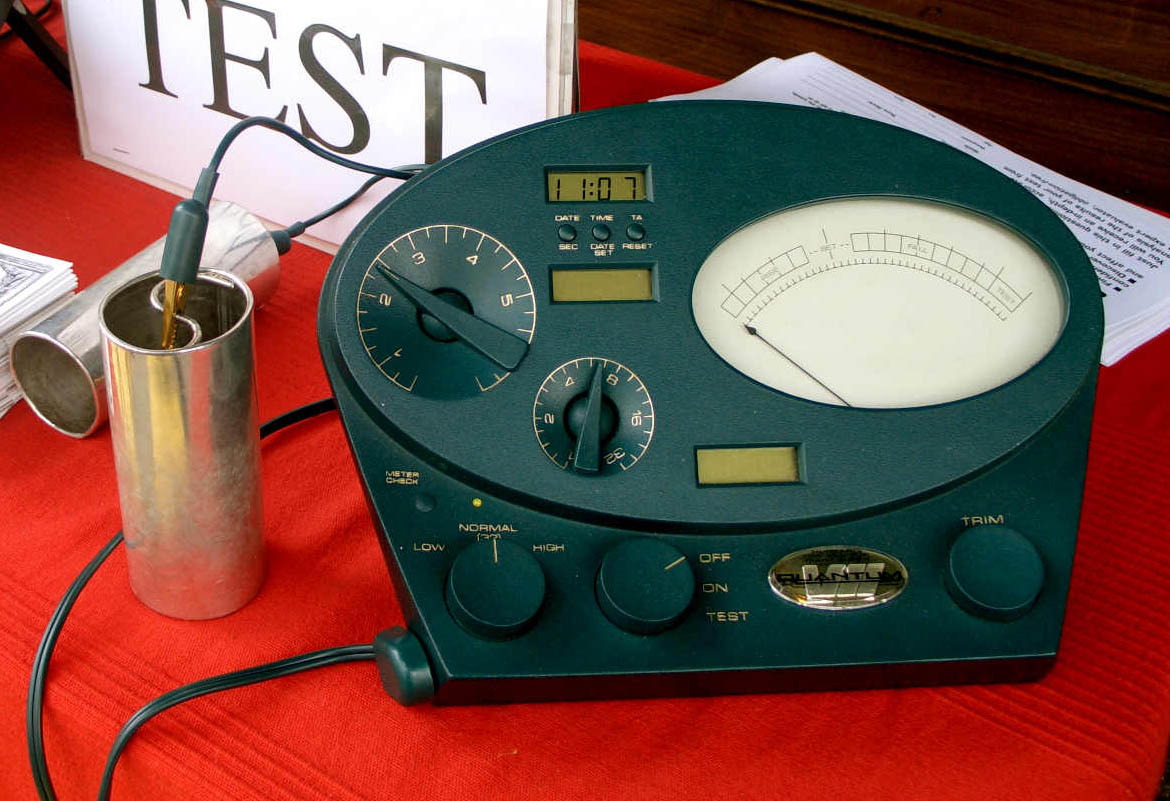
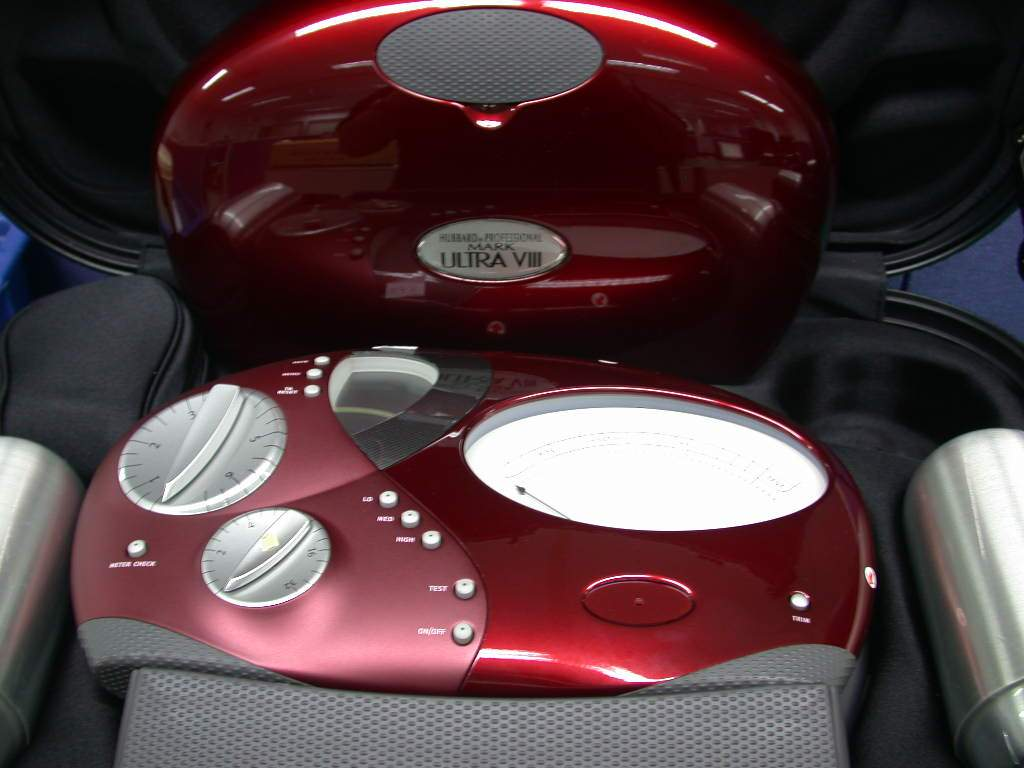
Mark V, Mark VI, Mark Super VII Quantum, and Mark VIII Ultra e-meters

The E-meter was adopted for use in Dianetics and Scientology when Mathison collaborated with Hubbard in 1951. Some sources say the E-meter was "developed by Volney Mathison following Hubbard's designs", or that Hubbard invented it. Hubbard falsely claimed to be the inventor of the E-meter, a claim which is in keeping with the Scientology stance that Hubbard is the "source", or "the only originator of all Dianetics and Scientology material".

The E-meter was not part of the early days of Dianetics and Scientology. Auditing was composed of conversation and not led by a mechanical device. Hubbard introduced an E-meter prototype during the 1952 Philadelphia Doctorate Course but did not introduce his transistorized version until several years later. The E-meter became "the principal material artifact" of Dianetics and Scientology from the 1960s onward.

In the book, L. Ron Hubbard, Messiah or Madman?, Bent Corydon wrote:

In late 1954 the use of the E-meter was discontinued by Hubbard. Wrote Hubbard: "Yesterday, we used an instrument called an E-Meter to register whether or not the process was still getting results so that the auditor would know how long to continue it. While the E-Meter is an interesting investigation instrument and has played its part in research, it is not today used by the auditor ... As we long ago suspected, the intervention of a mechanical gadget between the auditor and the preclear had a tendency to depersonalize the session ..." (Note: Corydon's account was said to be based on the memoirs of Hubbard's son, L. Ron Hubbard, Jr., later known as Ronald DeWolf, but in 1987 DeWolf sued the publisher to prevent publication and swore an affidavit repudiating everything in the book. See Affidavit submitted by DeWolf to a notary in Nevada.)

Though it seemed for a while that Scientology's more advanced techniques would serve without an E-meter, a few months later in May 1955, Hubbard wrote:

And here come E-Meters back into the picture. The HASI is, at this moment, building a new and better E-Meter than has ever been built before, under the trademarked name of Physio-galvanometer, or O-Meter. It has very little in common with the old type E-Meter. Nevertheless, an old type E-Meter can be utilized.

The Scientology meter was smaller, based on transistors rather than vacuum tubes, and powered by a low-voltage rechargeable battery rather than line voltage.

From then on, the E-meter was a required tool for Scientology ministers. The "Hubbard Mark II" E-meter was christened in 1960 and the Hubbard Mark III shortly after. On December 6, 1966, Hubbard won a patent on the Mark V version under the name "Hubbard Electropsychometer". Corydon wrote that the Hubbard E-meter was actually developed by Scientologists Don Breeding and Joe Wallis, though the patent (U.S. patent 3,290,589) does not list other developers.

The Scientology E-meter has been redesigned and re-patented several times since its first introduction to Dianetics (e.g.: U.S. patent 4,459,995, U.S. patent 4,578,635, U.S. patent 4,702,259).

== Technical description ==
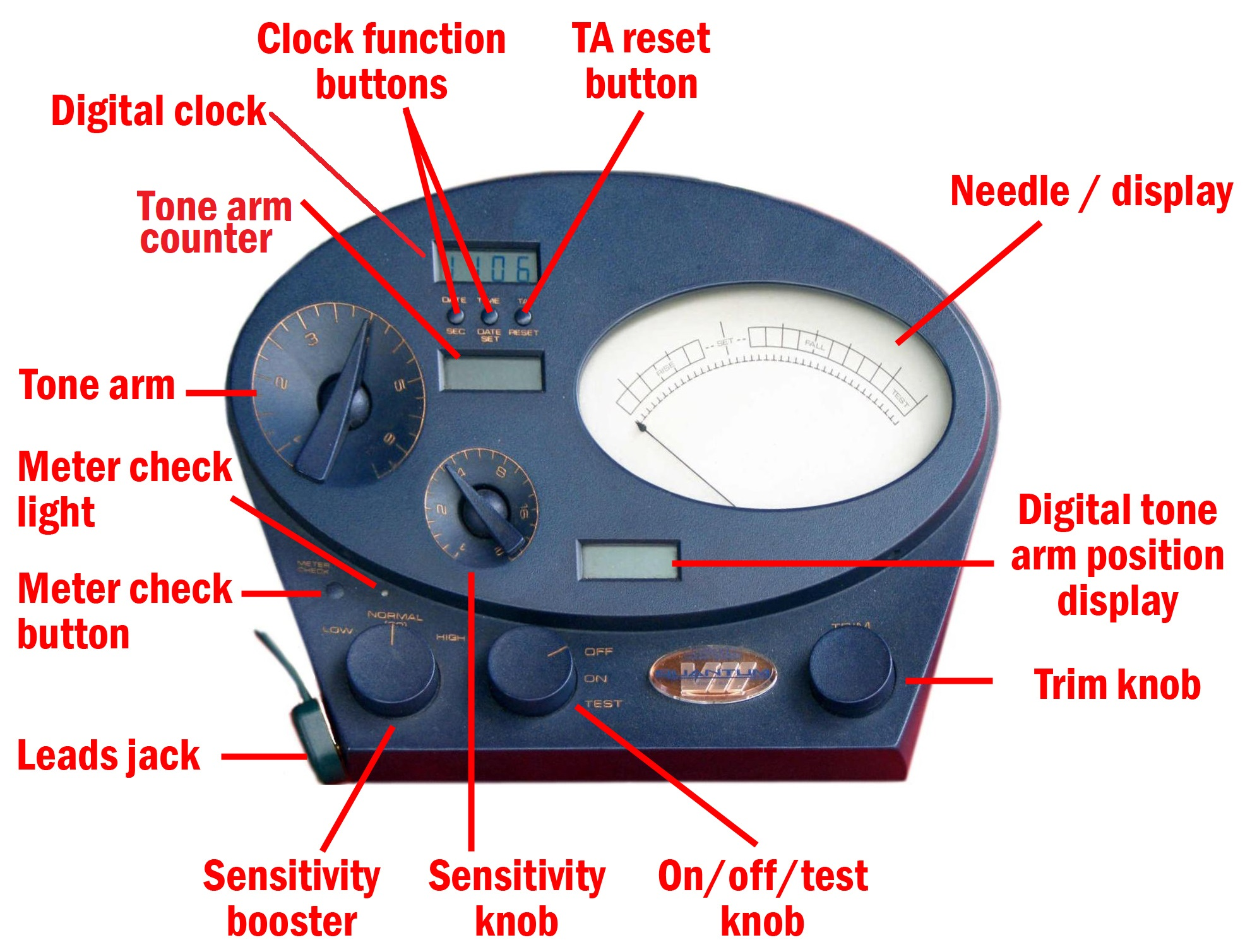
Parts of an e-meter

Most prominent on the face of the e-meter is a display with a needle pointer. There are several dials and knobs, and modern e-meters have several LCD displays. All models have knobs for turning the device on, testing it, setting the sensitivity, and boosting the device. The primary control for the auditor is the tone arm (a rotating lever) which is held throughout auditing and operated by one hand while the auditor writes with their other hand. As the needle on the display moves off the right or left of the dial, the tone arm is used to bring the needle back on the dial. During an auditing session, the auditor writes down questions he has asked the preclear, the preclear's answers, and activity of the e-meter such as needle movements and tone arm settings

There are ten main "needle actions" that an auditor is trained to spot, including a "fall," a smooth needle motion to the right; a "rise," a similar motion to the left; and a "free needle," or more commonly called a "floating needle," which is "a rhythmic sweep of the dial at a slow, even pace... back and forth."

— Harley and Kieffer

=== Electronics ===
One of the E-meter's primary components is a Wheatstone bridge, an electrical circuit configuration invented in 1833 that enables the detection of small differences between two electrical resistances. In the E-meter, one resistance is the subject's body and the other is a rheostat controlled by the operator. A small voltage from the battery is applied to electrodes held in the subject's hands. As the electrical properties of the subject's body change during the counseling session, the resulting changes in the small electric current are displayed in needle movements on a large analog panel meter. The dial face is without numbers because the absolute resistance in ohms is relatively unimportant, while the operator watches primarily for characteristic needle motions. The voltage applied to the electrodes is less than 1.5 V, and the electric current through the subject's body is less than a half a milliampere.

In the Scientology E-meter, the large control known as the "tone arm" adjusts the meter meter bias, while a smaller control adjusts the gain. The operator manipulates the tone arm to keep the needle near the center of the dial so its motion is easily observed.

According to Scientology doctrine, the resistance corresponds to the "mental mass and energy" of the subject's mind, which are claimed to change when the subject thinks of particular mental images (engrams). One account tells about Hubbard using the E-meter to determine whether or not fruits can experience pain, as in his 1968 assertion that tomatoes "scream when sliced".

== Use in Scientology ==
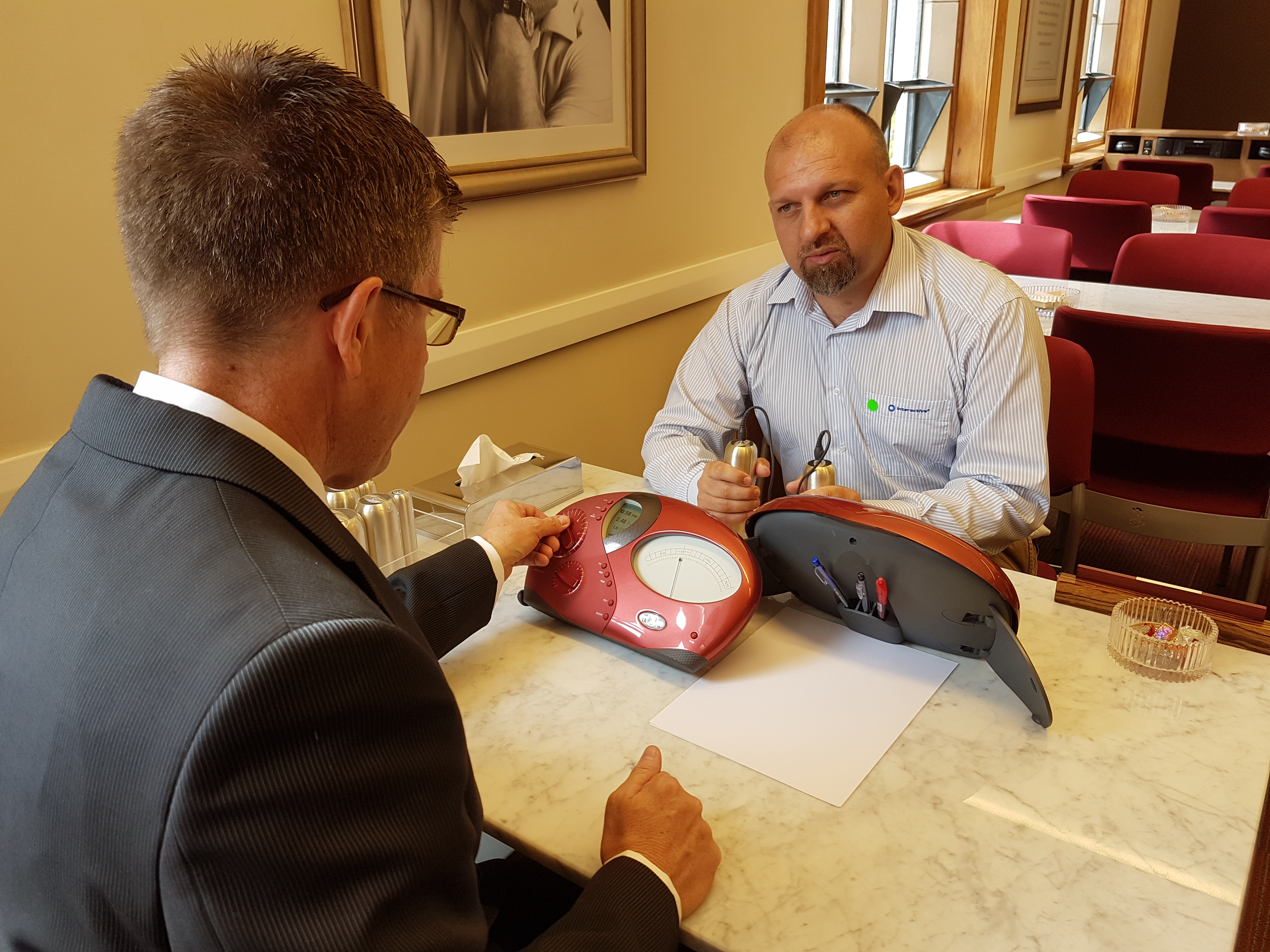
Demonstration of auditing, showing position of e-meter—auditor in foreground, preclear in background

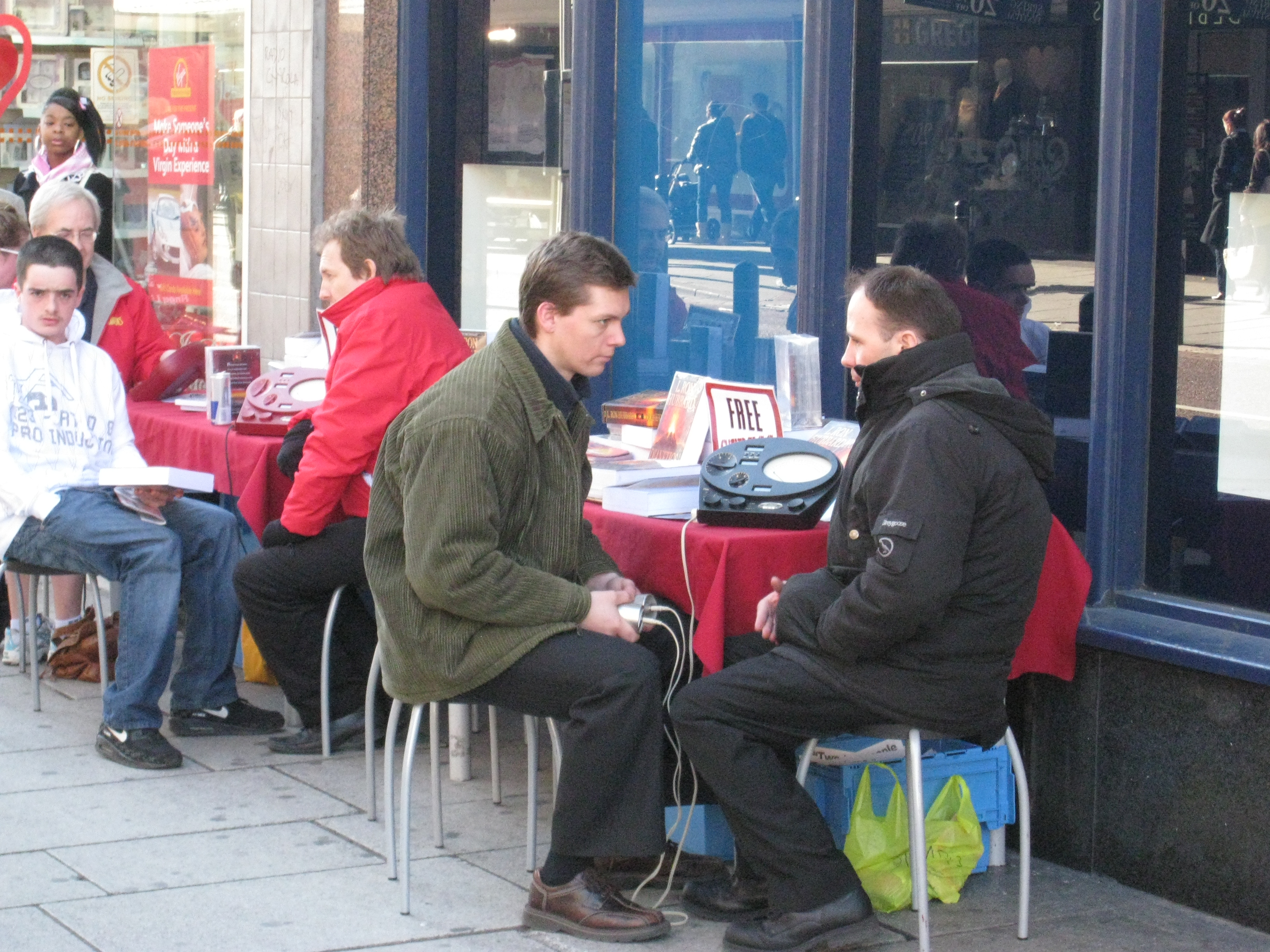
Using an e-meter to perform the stress test, a recruiting tool

E-meters are used by Scientology practitioners known as "auditors". Scientology materials refer to the subject as the "preclear". (Note: The person was originally called a preclear, because the end goal of early auditing was to reach the "State of Clear". However, auditing occurs well beyond the State of Clear while Hubbard's instructions continue to call the person being audited a preclear.) The auditor gives the preclear a series of commands or questions while the preclear holds a pair of cylindrical electrodes ("cans") connected to the meter, and the auditor notes both the verbal response and the activity of the meter. Auditor training includes familiarization with a number of characteristic needle movements, each with a specific significance. Religion scholar Dorthe Refslund Christensen describes the e-meter as "a technical device that could help the auditor locate engrams and areas of change when auditing a preclear".

Scientology concepts associated with the E-meter and its use are regarded by the scientific and medical communities as pseudoscience, as the E-meter has never been subjected to clinical trials as a therapeutic tool.

Scientologists claim that in the hands of a trained operator, the meter can indicate whether a person has been relieved from the spiritual impediment of past experiences. In accordance with a 1974 federal court order, the Church of Scientology asserts that the E-meter is intended for use only in church-sanctioned auditing sessions; it is not a curative or medical device. The E-meters used by the Church were previously manufactured by Scientologists at their Gold Base facility, but were being manufactured in Hong Kong and Taiwan as of 1998.

According to Hubbard, the E-meter is used by the operator for three vital functions:

1. To determine what process to run and what to run it on.
2. To observe how well the process is running.
3. To know when the process should be stopped.

The Church claims that the E-meter can be used to assess the emotional charge of single words, whole sentences, and questions, as well as indicating the general state of the subject when the operator is not speaking. Few users of the E-meter claim that it does anything to the subject. To most, it does no more than suggest to the operator a change of mental, emotional, or autonomic nervous system activity.

New religious movement scholar Douglas Cowan writes that Scientologists cannot progress along the Bridge to Total Freedom without an E-meter, and that Hubbard even told Scientologists to buy two E-meters, in the event that one of them fails to operate. According to anthropologist Roy Rappaport, the E-meter is a ritual object, an object that "stand[s] indexically for something intangible".

== Scientology beliefs and theories ==
Within the Church of Scientology, the early psychoanalysts are credited with first use of the E-meter.

Bob Thomas, senior executive of the Church of Scientology in the United States, described the E-meter ... "Some very early work on this was done by Jung, who used a list of words. I think he combined it with the psycho-galvanometer. By this word association, he was attempting to increase the effectiveness of the free association techniques, which he was not sure about."

Hubbard credited Mathison with recreating the E-meter and bringing him the first model for use in Dianetics. Hubbard set out his theory of how the E-meter works in his book Understanding the E-Meter:

For the meter to be read, the tiny flow of electrical energy through the preclear (person) has to remain steady. When this tiny flow is changed the needle of the E-Meter moves. This will happen if the preclear pulls in or releases mental mass. This mental mass (condensed energy), acts as an additional resistance or lack of resistance to the flow of electrical energy from the E-Meter.

Hubbard claimed that this "mental mass" has the same physical characteristics, including weight, as mass as commonly understood by lay persons:

In Scientology it has been discovered that mental energy is simply a finer, higher level of physical energy. The test of this is conclusive in that a thetan "mocking up" (creating) mental image pictures and thrusting them into the body can increase the body mass and by casting them away again can decrease the body mass. This test has actually been made and an increase of as much as thirty pounds, actually measured on scales, has been added to, and subtracted from, a body by creating "mental energy". Energy is energy. Matter is condensed energy.

This text in Understanding the E-Meter is accompanied by three drawings. The first shows a man standing on a weighing scale, which reflects a weight of "150" (the units are not given). The next shows the man on the same scale, weighed down under a burden of "Mental Image Pictures", and the scale indicates a weight of "180". The last picture shows the man standing upright on the scale, now unburdened by "Mental Image Pictures" and with a smile on his face, while the scale again indicates a weight of "148".

Bob Thomas, senior executive of the church in the early 1970s, gave a prosaic description.

The immediate goal of the E-meter is to enhance communication. In other words, just to take a parallel: if an analyst were allowing his patient to free-associate, and the patient were connected in some way with a galvanometer which showed the analyst what things the patient mentioned were emotionally charged and what things were not emotionally charged, a lot of time would be saved. So it's simply an assist for the practitioner to direct the individual to areas which he himself may not realize are troubled or charged with emotion or are repressed; and to better direct his attention into those areas ... The E-meter is a simple psycho-galvanometer. It's got some increased sensitivity built into it and the myological reactions that you sometimes get in the galvanometer have been damped out by the circuitry, so that the mental reactions, the reactions of the spirit, on the body are emphasized and can be read more clearly. But that's simply the design of the circuitry; it doesn't basically affect the kind of device. It registers what is called, commonly, the psychogalvanomic reflex, which is a reflex that is a poorly understood mechanism of the psyche. The body resistance seems to vary when the individual thinks of a painful or pain-associated or traumatic-associated concept, or word or idea. ... Some very early work was done on this by Jung ...

== Legal issues ==
=== United States ===
The medical establishment had been watching Hubbard's enterprises since 1951, when the New Jersey State Board of Medical Examiners filed a case against the Hubbard Dianetic Research Foundation in Elizabeth, New Jersey for practicing medicine without a license. In 1958, the Food and Drug Administration (FDA) seized and destroyed 21,000 Dianazene tablets from Hubbard's Distribution Center Inc., charging that they were falsely labeled as a treatment for radiation sickness.

On January 4, 1963, acting on a complaint by the Food and Drug Administration (FDA), US marshals raided the Founding Church of Scientology in Washington, D.C., and seized E-meters and Scientology literature. The FDA alleged that the Church was making false medical claims about the device and that the E-meters were misbranded under the Federal Food, Drug, and Cosmetic Act. The Church sued to get the property back, and years of litigation ensued.

At trial in 1967, a jury found that the Church misrepresented the E-meter, and the judge ordered the confiscated materials destroyed. However, in 1969 the US Court of Appeals for D.C. reversed the verdict and ordered a new trial, holding that courts could not evaluate Scientology's religious claims about the E-meter as "false labeling", and that only secular claims could be considered.

At the second trial in 1971, the U.S. District Court for the District of Columbia ruled the E-meter a "misbranded device" under the Federal Food, Drug, and Cosmetic Act. The court condemned the seized meters and Scientology literature, but allowed the Church to reclaim them on the condition that the E-meter be used only for bona fide religious counseling and that all meters and related literature carry a prominent warning stating that the device has no medical or scientific utility.

In 1973, the U.S. Court of Appeals affirmed the misbranding finding but modified the order, removing provisions that required users to file affidavits with the FDA and eliminating mandatory labeling that the device had been "condemned" by a federal court, holding that these requirements created excessive entanglement with religion. The remaining restrictions were upheld, including the mandatory non-medical disclaimer and limitation to religious use.

In his 1973 judgment, District Court Judge Gerhard Gesell ruled that:

Hubbard and his fellow Scientologists developed the notion of using an E-Meter to aid auditing. Substantial fees were charged for the meter and for auditing sessions using the meter. They repeatedly and explicitly represented that such auditing effectuated cures of many physical and mental illnesses. An individual processed with the aid of the E-Meter was said to reach the intended goal of 'clear' and was led to believe that there was reliable scientific proof that once cleared many, indeed most, illnesses would successfully be cured. Auditing was guaranteed to be successful. All this was and is false.

Unable to do more under the mandate from the Court of Appeals, Judge Gesell ordered all the property to be returned to the Church, and thereafter, the E-meter may be used only in "bona fide religious counseling". All meters and referring literature must include a label disclaiming any medical benefits:

The E-Meter is not medically or scientifically useful for the diagnosis, treatment or prevention of any disease. It is not medically or scientifically capable of improving the health or bodily functions of anyone.

The church adopted a modified version of that statement, which it still invokes in connection with the E-meter. The modified statement reads:

The Hubbard Electrometer is a religious artifact. By itself, this meter does nothing. It is for religious use by students and Ministers of the church in Confessionals and pastoral counseling only.

Judge Gesell also ordered the Church to pay all the government's legal fees and warehousing costs for the confiscated property for the nine years of litigation. He also required the church to pay the salaries and travel expenses of FDA agents who might, from time to time, inspect for compliance with the court's order.

=== Australia ===
In 1964, the government of Victoria, Australia, held a Board of Inquiry into Scientology which returned its findings in a document commonly referred to as the Anderson Report. Psychiatrist Ian Holland Martin, honorary federal secretary of the Australian and New Zealand College of Psychiatrists, gave evidence that the E-Meter "used for Scientology" was a "psycho-galvano-meter" and was "dangerous in unqualified hands". He said that if the E-meter "was suggested to possess mysterious powers" to someone who did not understand that it had "been thoroughly discredited as a lie detector" then "that person would be suggestible to ideas foisted on him by the operator". The final report of the inquiry stated that the E-meter enabled Scientology, in his own words,

to assume, intensify and retain control over the minds and wills of preclears. Fears of its abilities keep them in constant subjection. Its use can be so manipulated by cunningly phrased questions that almost any desired result can be obtained, and it is used unscrupulously to dominate students and staff alike. All the evil features of scientology are intensified where the E-meter is involved. When used in conjunction with hypnotic techniques, its evil impact is greatly increased.

This simple electrical device is not, of course, the sole basis for the condemnation of scientology, but without the E-meter scientology would be partly disarmed.

In 1965, Victoria banned the use of the E-meter without a license, with Western Australia and South Australia following suit. In 1969, the High Court of Western Australia ruled the ban illegal. South Australia repealed its law in 1973, and Victoria repealed it in 1982. In 1983, the High Court of Australia ruled that Scientology was a religion and as such had the same rights and protections.

=== Sweden ===
In 1979, a court forbade calling the E-meter "an invaluable aid to measuring man's mental state and changes in it" in an advertisement. The prohibition was upheld by the European Commission of Human Rights in case X. and Church of Scientology v. Sweden.

== See also ==
- Auditing (Scientology)
- Biofeedback
- Ohmmeter
- Thought identification
