= Church of Scientology v. Sweden =

1980 European Commission of Human Rights case

Église de Scientologie c. Suède [Church of Scientology v. Sweden]
- Court: European Court of Human Rights
- Decided: 14 July 1980

Church of Scientology v. Sweden (8282/78) was a case decided by the European Commission of Human Rights in 1980.

== Background ==
In 1975, a Swedish newspaper published certain statements made in the course of lecture by a professor of theology, including that "Scientology in the most untruthful movement there is. It is the cholera of spiritual life. That is how dangerous it is".

Request by the Church of Scientology to start proceedings against the publisher was rejected by the Supreme Court.

== Decision ==
The commission declared the application inadmissible. Concerning Article 9 of the Convention (freedom of religion), it noted that the Commission does not exclude the possibility of criticism or 'agitation' against a church or religious group reaching such a level that it might endanger freedom of religion and where a tolerance of such behaviour by the authorities could engage State responsibility. However, the Commission does not consider that such an issue arises on the facts of the present case.

Concerning Article 6 (access to court), the Commission reaffirmed that the right of an individual to protect his reputation can be regarded as a civil right protected by Article 6, but did not extend this protection to a group, when the national legislation didn't foresee that.

== See also ==
- X. and Church of Scientology v. Sweden
- Scientology and law
