= Greece v United Kingdom =

Greece v United Kingdom may refer to multiple court cases:

- Ambatielos case, a 1952 case regarding state liability
- Greece v United Kingdom (1956), a case heard by the European Commission of Human Rights
