= X. and Church of Scientology v. Sweden =

European court case

X. et Église de Scientologie c. Suède [X and Church of Scientology v. Sweden]
- Court: European Court of Human Rights
- Decided: 5 May 1979

X. and Church of Scientology v. Sweden (7805/77) was a case decided by the European Commission of Human Rights in 1979.

== Facts ==
In 1973, the Church of Scientology of Sweden placed an advertisement for an E-meter in its periodical. The Consumer Ombudsman, acting upon complaints, requested the Market Court place an injunction prohibiting the use of certain passages in the advertisement, namely that it was "an invaluable aid to measuring man's mental state and changes in it". The court granted the injunction, and the Church's petition was rejected by the Supreme Court of Sweden.

== Decision ==
The commission declared the Church's petition inadmissible. Concerning Article 9 of the European Convention on Human Rights (freedom of thought, conscience and religion), it mentioned that "the Market Court did not prevent the Church from selling the E-meter or even advertising it for sale as such" and stated that "the concept, contained in the first paragraph of Article 9, concerning the manifestation of a belief in practice does not confer protection on statement of purported religious belief which appear as selling 'arguments' in advertisements of a purely commercial nature by a religious group", therefore founding no interference with Church's rights.

Concerning Article 10 (freedom of expression), the Commission found an interference with applicant's rights. However, it found the interference necessary in a democratic society, stating that "the test of 'necessity' in the second paragraph of Article 10 should therefore be a less strict one when applied to restraints imposed on commercial 'ideas'" (compared with 'political' ideas).

The case was also significant, since the Commission recognised in its decision the right of a church to petition on behalf of its members, changing the previous practice.

== See also ==
- Church of Scientology v. Sweden
- Scientology and law
