= Sperduti =

Sperduti is an Italian surname. Notable people with the surname include:

- Alessandro Sperduti, Italian actor
- Anthony Sperduti, American businessman
- Giuseppe Sperduti, Italian jurist
- Mauricio Sperduti (born 1986), Argentine footballer
- Paolo Sperduti (1725 – 1799), Italian painter

== See also ==
- Sperduti nel buio, 1947 Italian drama film
