= Constantin Eustathiades =

Greek jurist (1912–1979)

Constantin Eustathiades (Greek: Κωνσταντίνος Ευσταθιάδης; Athens, 1912 – Athens, 29 June 1979) was a Greek jurist. He served on the European Commission of Human Rights from 1954 to 1970 and the International Law Commission from 1967 to 1971.
