= Greece v United Kingdom (1956) =

Greece v United Kingdom (176/1956) was a case before the European Commission of Human Rights in which Greece alleged abuses by the British government in Cyprus.

== Sources ==
- Bates, Ed (2010). "Greece v United Kingdom—Britain held to account for its actions in Cyprus". The Evolution of the European Convention on Human Rights: From Its Inception to the Creation of a Permanent Court of Human Rights. Oxford University Press. pp. 195–199. ISBN 978-0-19-920799-2.
- Simpson, A. W. Brian (2004). "The First Cyprus Case". Human Rights and the End of Empire: Britain and the Genesis of the European Convention. Oxford University Press. pp. 924–987. ISBN 978-0-19-926789-7.
