= Philip O'Donoghue =

Philip O'Donoghue (1896–1987) was an Irish jurist who served on the European Commission of Human Rights (1965–1971) and European Court of Human Rights (1971–1980). He also was a member of the Irish Commission on the Status of Women in 1970.
