= United States v. Hubbard Electrometer =

United States v. An Article Or Device… "Hubbard Electrometer" or "Hubbard E-Meter," etc.
- Court: United States District Court for the District of Columbia
- Decided: July 30, 1971
- Citation: 333 F. Supp. 357

Court membership
- Judge sitting: Gerhard Gesell

United States v. An Article Or Device… "Hubbard Electrometer" or "Hubbard E-Meter," etc., 333 F. Supp. 357 (D.D.C. 1971), was a case decided by the United States District Court for the District of Columbia concerning the E-meter, a device used by the Church of Scientology in its religious practice of auditing.

The case resulted from a 1963 seizure by the Food and Drug Administration of E-meters and related literature from the Founding Church of Scientology on grounds that the devices qualified as "misbranded" under the Federal Food, Drug, and Cosmetic Act. Judge Gerhard Gesell ruled that, while the E-meter could not be lawfully marketed or used with medical or scientific claims, it could continue to be used as part of bona fide religious counseling, subject to an explicit warning disclaimer affixed to the device itself.

Because this is a jurisdiction in rem case, the respondent is an object rather than a legal person.

== Background ==
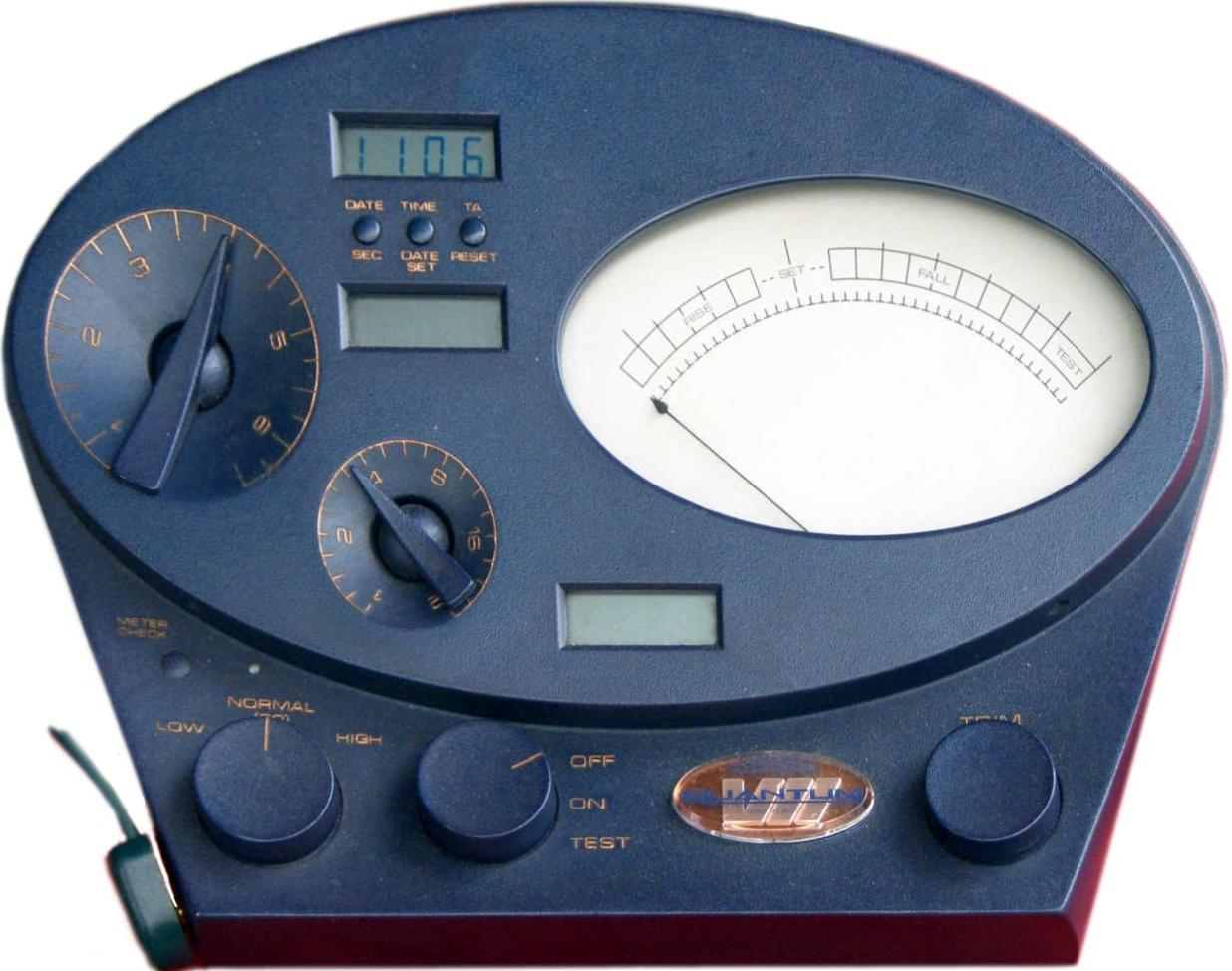
A Scientology E-Meter

L. Ron Hubbard attracted scrutiny from the medical establishment almost immediately upon the success of his 1950 bestselling book Dianetics: The Modern Science of Mental Health. In 1951, the New Jersey State Board of Medical Examiners filed a case against the Hubbard Dianetic Research Foundation in Elizabeth, New Jersey for practicing medicine without a license. In 1958, the Food and Drug Administration (FDA) seized and destroyed 21,000 Dianazene tablets from Hubbard's Distribution Center Inc., charging that they were falsely labeled as a treatment for radiation sickness.

On January 4, 1963, acting on a complaint by the Food and Drug Administration (FDA), US marshals raided the Founding Church of Scientology in Washington, D.C., and seized more than 100 E-meters and roughly 200 copies of Scientology literature. The FDA alleged that the Church was making false medical claims about the device and that the E-meters were misbranded under the Federal Food, Drug, and Cosmetic Act, arguing that the e-meter was a "device" within the meaning of the act, and that it was misbranded because it was sold and used with false or misleading claims that it could diagnose, treat, or cure physical and mental illness. The Church sued for the return of the seized articles, and years of litigation ensued.

The e-meter is a skin galvanometer, resembling one channel of a polygraph.

== Ruling ==
Judge Gesell found that the seized literature distributed with the E-meter made explicit, non-religious representations that auditing could diagnose and cure a wide range of physical and psychosomatic illnesses:

Hubbard and his fellow Scientologists developed the notion of using an E-Meter to aid auditing. Substantial fees were charged for the meter and for auditing sessions using the meter. They repeatedly and explicitly represented that such auditing effectuated cures of many physical and mental illnesses. An individual processed with the aid of the E-Meter was said to reach the intended goal of 'clear' and was led to believe that there was reliable scientific proof that once cleared many, indeed most, illnesses would successfully be cured. Auditing was guaranteed to be successful. All this was and is false.

Judge Gesell found these secular claims to be false and scientifically unsupported, and concluded that a single such false, non-religious claim was sufficient to support a finding of misbranding under the Act. However, Gesell also recognized that the Founding Church of Scientology was a bona fide religion, and that auditing was a central religious practice of that faith. Balancing the requirements of the Food, Drug, and Cosmetic Act against the protections of the First Amendment, the court held that it lacked authority to order the outright forfeiture and destruction of the E-meter, as the government had requested, because doing so would improperly interfere with the Church's religious practice. Under mandate from the Court of Appeals, Judge Gesell ordered all the property to be returned to the Church. Judge Gesell also ordered the Church to pay all the government's legal fees and warehousing costs for the confiscated property over nine years of litigation, and required the church to pay the salaries and travel expenses of FDA agents to inspect for compliance with the court's order.

== Subsequent developments ==
As a result of this case, e-meters used by the Church of Scientology bear the following disclaimer:

By itself, this meter does nothing. It is solely for the guide of Ministers of the Church in Confessionals and pastoral counseling. The Electrometer is not medically or scientifically capable of improving the health or bodily function of anyone and is for religious use by students and ministers of the Church of Scientology only…

Similar text also appears in Church materials describing the e-meter and its use.

The case is frequently cited in later litigation involving the Church of Scientology, as part of background establishing the Church's recognition as a religion for First Amendment purposes, and the legal limits on claims made for Scientology auditing, including Christofferson v. Church of Scientology (Or. Ct. App. 1982) and Church of Scientology Flag Service Organization v. City of Clearwater (11th Cir. 1993). It was also cited by the United States Court of Appeals for the Seventh Circuit in a decision upholding a ban on the Toftness device.
