= Centre on Housing Rights and Evictions =

Swiss international non-governmental organization

The Centre on Housing Rights and Evictions (COHRE) was a non-governmental organisation set up by Scott Leckie in 1991. It was incorporated in 1994 and based in the Netherlands. It later moved headquarters to Geneva, Switzerland and had satellite offices in Australian, Brazil, Cambodia, Ghana, Sri Lanka and the USA. COHRE focused on human rights regarding housing, sanitation and water. It worked globally; a report estimated that around 7 million people had experienced forced evictions in 60 countries, between January 2001 and December 2002. It closed down in 2014.
