= Interstate human rights case =

In International human rights law, an interstate case occurs when one state party to a human rights treaty brings a lawsuit against another state, alleging violations of human rights.

== See also ==
- International legal system

== Sources ==
- Leckie, Scott (1988). "The Inter-State Complaint Procedure in International Human Rights Law: Hopeful Prospects or Wishful Thinking?". Human Rights Quarterly. 10 (2): 249–303. doi:10.2307/762144. ISSN 0275-0392. JSTOR 762144.
- Risini, Isabella (2018). The Inter-State Application under the European Convention on Human Rights: Between Collective Enforcement of Human Rights and International Dispute Settlement. Brill Publishers. ISBN 978-90-04-35726-6.
