= Admission =

Admission may refer to:

== Arts and media ==
- "Admissions" (CSI: NY), a 2008 television episode
- "Admissions" (Dawson's Creek), a 2001 television episode
- Admission (film), a 2013 comedy film
- Admission (album), a 2019 album by Florida sludge metal band Torche
- Admission (novel), a 2020 novel by Julie Buxbaum

== Legal proceedings ==
- Admission (law), a statement that may be used in court against the person making it
- Acceptance of admissible evidence in court
- The process of official inclusion in a state, the opposite of secession

== Status granted to a person ==
- University and college admission
- Admission to the bar, change in status allowing an applicant to become part of a profession

== Other uses ==
- The process by which patients enter into inpatient care
- Admittance, the inverse of impedance

== See also ==
- Admissibility (disambiguation)
- List of U.S. states by date of admission to the Union
