= Admissibility =

Admissibility may refer to:

== Law ==
- Admissible evidence, evidence which may be introduced in a court of law
- Admissibility (ECHR), whether a case will be considered in the European Convention on Human Rights system

== Mathematics and logic ==
- Admissible decision rule, in statistical decision theory, a rule which is never dominated
- Admissible rule, in logic, a type of rule of inference
- Admissible heuristic, in computer science, is a heuristic which is no more than the lowest-cost path to the goal
- Admissible prime k-tuple, in number theory regarding possible constellations of prime numbers
- Admissible set, in mathematical logic, a transitive set satisfying the axioms of Kripke-Platek set theory
- Admissible representation, in mathematics, is a particular kind of a representation.
