= Edwin Busuttil =

Maltese politician

Professor Edwin Busuttil (1923–2009) was a Maltese politician, son of Paul and Therese (Spiteri) Busuttil. He served as Head of Department of Public Law and Criminal Law, as well as Dean of the Faculty of Law and Pro-Rector at the University of Malta.

== Education ==
Royal University of Malta: BA 1943; LLD (law doctorate) 1946; Oxford: BLitt 1949, MA 1952.

== Career ==
(1960–1961), he was Research fellow, NATO Paris, Kentucky, United States. 1962-1987 professor public law University Malta.

Busuttil was deputy leader of Malta's Constitutional Party and was a member of Parliament between 1952 and 1953, as well as speaker of the House of Representatives. He served as a member of the University Senate, the University Council, the Medical Council, chairman of the Broadcasting Authority, chairman of the Disciplinary Board of the Public Service Commission and Electoral Commissioner. Busuttil served on the European Commission of Human Rights for 32 years and the European Commission's Delegate to Human Rights Conferences all over the world. He carried the post of government consultant on the Ratification of International Treaties. Busuttil was vice-president of the Centro Internazionale di Ricerche, Studi Sociologici, Penali e Penitenziari of Messina, Italy.

He is the author of publications and articles in legal publications. He was a Rhodes Scholar at Christ Church, Oxford from 1942.

== Personal life ==
Busuttil died on 20 December 2009, and was survived by his wife Emma and three sons, Clarence, Graham, and Trafford.

He is buried at the cemetery of Santa Maria Addolorata ("Our Lady of Sorrows") in Paola, the largest graveyard of the country.
