= Tahsin Bekir Balta =

Turkish politician

Tahsin Bekir Balta (1902–1970) was a Turkish politician and member of the European Commission of Human Rights from 1963 to 1969.
