= Adolf Süsterhenn =

German lawyer and politician (1905–1974)

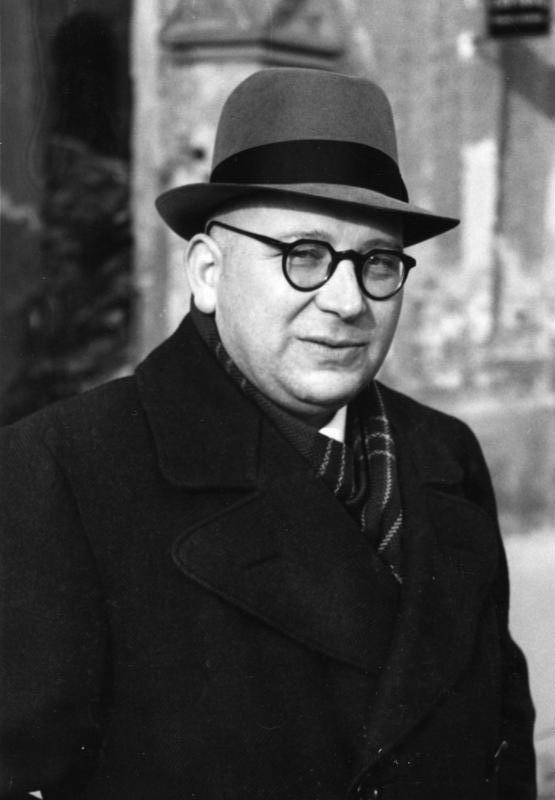
Adolf Süsterhenn in 1949

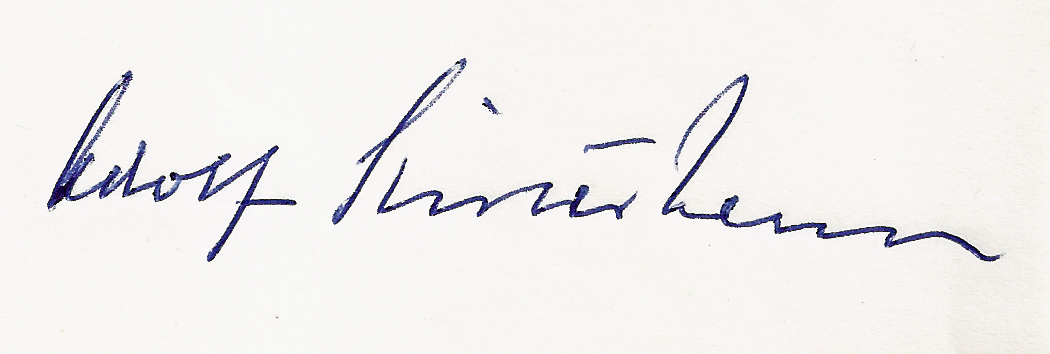
Süsterhenn’s signature, 1959

Adolf Süsterhenn (1905–1974) was a German constitutional lawyer and politician. He worked on the state constitution for Rhineland-Palatinate and was on the Parlamentarischer Rat, which drafted the Basic Law for the Federal Republic of Germany. He was born on 31 May 1905 in Cologne and was Minister for Culture and Justice in Rhineland-Palatinate between 1946 and 1951 for Christian Democratic Union of Germany. He also served on the European Commission of Human Rights from 1954 to 1973. He died in Cologne on 24 November 1974 at the age of 69.

Süsterhenn, along with Franz-Josef Wuermeling, had been one of the leading advocates of continuing the criminalization of homosexuality in West Germany according to the 1935 version of Paragraph 175 introduced under Nazism. In 1968, he relaxed his stance on the issue, commenting that many Catholic moral theologians no longer saw homosexuality as something that must be punished by the state.
