= Michalakis Triantafyllides =

Cypriot jurist

Michalakis Antoniou Triantafyllides (Greek: Μιχαλάκης Αντωνίου Τριανταφυλλίδης; 1927–2005) was a Cypriot jurist who served as president of the Supreme Court of Cyprus (1971–1988) and Attorney General of Cyprus (1988–1995). He also served on the European Commission of Human Rights from 1963 to 1989.
