= Giuseppe Sperduti =

Giuseppe Sperduti (Giuliano di Roma 1912 – Rome 1993) was an Italian jurist. Professor of International law at University of Pisa, he served on the European Commission of Human Rights from 1960 to 1992.
