= Admissibility (ECHR) =

Under the European Convention on Human Rights, admissibility governs whether an individual or inter-State application will be accepted for consideration on the merits and progress to a full case. Normally, all domestic legal remedies must be exhausted before an application will be considered by the European Court of Human Rights. Inter-State cases are subject to more lenient admissibility rules than applications by individuals.
