= Scott Leckie =

Scott Leckie (born 1962) is an international human rights and global housing advocate in the field of economic, social and cultural rights. He established several human rights organisations and remedial institutions.

== Career ==
Scott Leckie is the Director of Displacement Solutions, a Geneva-based NGO working to assist people who are displaced from their homes due to conflict or climate change. He is also Director of Oneness World Foundation, an organisation that identifies practical, peaceful and evolutionary ways to establish a post-nation-state world governed on the basis that all humans are equal citizens of Earth, rather than exclusively citizens of individual nation-states.

Leckie founded the Centre on Housing Rights and Evictions (COHRE) and was executive director from 1991 to 2007.

He has worked with the Centre for Human Settlements of the University of British Columbia, the Panos Institute, the International Institute for Environment and Development (IIED) and the Netherlands Institute of Human Rights (SIM).

From 1989 to 1999 he acted as Legal Counsel and United Nations Representative for Habitat International Coalition.

He was born in Los Angeles, California and holds citizenship in the Netherlands. He resides in Australia.

=== 1998 ===
- Prepared a Plan of Action on behalf of UNHCR for the possible return of refugees and Internally Displaced Persons (IDPs) in the Republic of Georgia and South Ossetia, including a draft Law on Housing and Property Restitution of the Republic of Georgia.

=== 1999 ===
- Designed the UN Mission in Kosovo (UNMIK) Housing and Property Directorate, which to date has settled over 29,000 restitution claims in the territory.

=== 2002 ===
- With the support of the OSCE and the World Bank, he developed a legal reform plan in Albania to facilitate the restitution of properties illegally seized during the period of dictatorship and provided legal analysis of the draft Law on Return and Compensation for Property of Former Owners.

== Publications ==
- 2003 – Returning Home: Housing and Property Restitution Rights of Refugees and Displaced Persons was published by Transnational Publishers.
- 2007 – Housing, Land and Property Restitution Rights of Refugees and Displaced Persons: Laws, Cases and Materials was also published by CUP.
- 2007 – Handbook on the Implementation of Housing, Land and Property Rights for the Internal Displacement Division of the UN's Office for the Coordination of Humanitarian Affairs (OCHA).
- 2008 – Cambridge University Press (CUP) published his edited volume Housing, Land And Property Rights in Post-Conflict United Nations And Other Peace Operations: A Comparative Survey & Proposals For Reform.

== Guest editor ==
- April 2000 Oxford University's Forced Migration Review
- 2000 UNHCR's Refugee Survey Quarterly (2000)
