= Ed Bates =

British academic

Ed Bates is a scholar of human rights and international law at the University of Leicester.

== Works ==
- Bates, Ed (2010). The Evolution of the European Convention on Human Rights: From Its Inception to the Creation of a Permanent Court of Human Rights. Oxford University Press. ISBN 978-0-19-920799-2.
- Harris, David John; O'Boyle, Michael; Bates, Ed; Buckley, Carla (2014). Law of the European Convention on Human Rights. Oxford University Press. ISBN 978-0-19-960639-9.
