= Human Rights Quarterly =

- Discipline: Political science, policy studies, law
- Language: English
- Edited by: Bert B. Lockwood

Publication details
- History: 1979–present
- Publisher: Johns Hopkins University Press (United States)
- Frequency: Quarterly
- Impact factor: 0.841 (2014)

Standard abbreviations
- Bluebook: Hum. Rts. Q.
- ISO 4: Hum. Rights Q.

Indexing
- ISSN: 0275-0392 (print); 1085-794X (web)
- OCLC no.: 33418941

Links
- Journal homepage; Online access

Human Rights Quarterly (HRQ) is a quarterly academic journal founded by Richard Pierre Claude in 1982 covering human rights. The journal is intended for scholars and policymakers and follows recent developments from both governments and non-governmental organizations. It includes research in policy analysis, book reviews, and philosophical essays. The journal is published by the Johns Hopkins University Press and the editor-in-chief is Bert B. Lockwood, Jr. (Urban Morgan Institute for Human Rights, University of Cincinnati College of Law).

According to the Journal Citation Reports, the journal has a 2014 impact factor of 0.841, ranking it 68th out of 161 journals in the category "Political Science" and 23rd out of 41 journals in the category "Social Issues".

== See also ==
- Universal Declaration of Human Rights
- International human rights law
