= European Commission of Human Rights =

Former body of the Council of Europe

- Established: 1954
- Dissolved: 1998
- Location: Strasbourg, France
- Authorised by: European Convention on Human Rights

The European Commission of Human Rights (ECmHR) was a special body of the Council of Europe. From 1954 to the 1998 entry into force of Protocol 11 to the European Convention on Human Rights, individuals did not have direct access to the European Court of Human Rights; they had to apply to the commission, which if it found the case to be well-founded would launch a case in the Court on the individual's behalf. Protocol 11 which came into force in 1998 abolished the commission, enlarged the Court, and allowed individuals to take cases directly to it.

== Role and formation ==
Commission members were elected by the Committee of Ministers and would hold office for six years (during which time they were to act independently, without allegiance to any state). Their role was to consider if a petition was admissible to the Court. If so, the Commission would examine the petition to determine the facts of the case and look for parties that could help settle the case in a friendly manner. If a friendly settlement could not take place, the Commission would issue a report on the established facts with an opinion on whether or not a violation had occurred. A Committee of three people determined the admissibility of a petition. For difficult decisions, however, a Chamber consisting of seven people handled it.

== List of cases ==
- Communist Party of Germany v. the Federal Republic of Germany
- Greek case
- W.P. v. United Kingdom
- Jagmail Singh Cheema v. France
- Dehwari v. The Netherlands
- Berke v. France
- Hatami v. Sweden
- Dabhi v. United Kingdom
- M.A.R. v. United Kingdom
- George Ganchev v. Bulgaria
- Slepcik v. The Netherlands
- Choudry v. United Kingdom
- Harron and Alayo v. Sweden
- Paez v. Sweden
- Arrowsmith v. United Kingdom
