= A, B and C v Ireland =

Case of the European Court of Human Rights on the right to privacy under Article 8

Decided 16 December 2010
- ECLI: ECLI:CE:ECHR:2010:1216JUD002557905
- Chamber: Grand Chamber
- Language of proceedings: English, French, Turkish, Russian, Armenian, Ukrainian, Croatian, Azerbaijani, Romanian, Georgian, Macedonian, Icelandic, Italian, German
- Nationality of parties: Irish, Lithuanian

Ruling
- Irish law prohibiting abortion in all cases except risk to life of the mother does not violate Article 8 of the ECHR. Ireland did violate the Article 8 rights of the third plaintiff by failing to provide a mechanism by which she could determine whether she could legally obtain an abortion in a situation where she believed her life might be at risk. Judgment against the first two plaintiffs but for the third.

Court composition
- President; Jean-Paul Costa
- Judges: Christos Rozakis; Nicolas Bratza; Françoise Tulkens; Josep Casadevall; Giovanni Bonello; Corneliu Bîrsan; Elisabet Fura; Alvina Gyulumyan; Khanlar Hajiyev; Egbert Myjer; Päivi Hirvelä; Giorgio Malinverni; George Nicolaou; Luis López Guerra; Mihai Poalelungi; Mary Finlay Geoghegan

Instruments cited
- European Convention of Human Rights

Legislation affecting
- Eighth Amendment of the Constitution of Ireland, Protection of Life During Pregnancy Act

Keywords
- (Art. 35) Admissibility criteria; (Art. 35-1) Exhaustion of domestic remedies; (Art. 8) Right to respect for private and family life; (Art. 8-1) Respect for private life, (Art. 8-2) Interference; (Art. 8-2) Necessary in a democratic society; (Art. 8-2) Protection of morals; (Art. 8-2) Prescribed by law; Margin of appreciation; Positive obligations; Proportionality; (Art. 41) Just satisfaction-{general}; Privacy; Abortion; right to a family life

Case opinions
- Majority: Costa, Bratza, Bonello, Bîrsan, Gyulumyan, Hajiyev, Myjer, Nicolaou
- Concurrence: López Guerra, Casadevall
- Concurrence: Finlay Geoghegan
- Dissent: Rozakis, Tulkens, Fura, Hirvelä, Malinverni, Poalelung

A, B and C v Ireland is a landmark 2010 case of the European Court of Human Rights on the right to privacy under Article 8. The court rejected the argument that article 8 conferred a right to abortion, but found that Ireland had violated the European Convention on Human Rights by failing to provide an accessible and effective procedure by which a woman can have established whether she qualifies for a legal abortion under current Irish law.

== Facts ==
Three anonymous women, recorded in the case as "A, B and C" travelled to the United Kingdom to have abortions, because abortions were unlawful in Ireland.

=== A ===
A, thinking her partner was infertile, had become pregnant unintentionally. She was unmarried, unemployed, living in poverty, with an alcohol addiction and had four children, all in foster care and one disabled. At risk of post-natal depression and feeling a fifth child would risk her progress in becoming sober, she borrowed €650 from a money lender at a high-interest rate to pay for travel and a private clinic in the UK, arriving secretly in the UK without telling her family or social workers or missing a contact visit with her children. On the returning train from Dublin she began bleeding profusely, was taken to hospital for a dilation and curettage and suffered pain, nausea and bleeding for weeks thereafter but did not seek further medical advice. After the claim was made to the ECHR, she became pregnant again and gave birth to a fifth child, while struggling with depression. However, she regained custody of two of her children.

=== B ===
B became pregnant after her "morning-after pill" failed. Two different doctors advised there was a risk of an ectopic pregnancy, although she had found it was not. She borrowed a friend's credit card to book flights to the UK. To ensure her family would not find out, she listed nobody as her next of kin once in the UK and travelled alone. The clinic in the UK advised her to tell the Irish doctors she had had a miscarriage. Two weeks after returning to Ireland she began to start passing blood clots, and sought follow-up care in a clinic in Dublin related to the English clinic, rather than attending an ordinary doctor because of her uncertainty of abortion's legality in Ireland.

=== C ===
C had been undergoing chemotherapy for cancer for three years. She had wanted children, but advice from doctors indicated that a foetus could be harmed during any ongoing chemotherapy. The cancer went into remission and she unintentionally became pregnant. While consulting her general practitioner on the impact of the pregnancy on her health and life and tests for cancer on the foetus, she alleged that she received insufficient information due to the chilling effect of the Irish legal framework. She researched the issues on the internet alone. Because she was unsure about the risks, she decided to go to the UK for an abortion. She could not find a clinic for a medical abortion, since she was a non-resident and would need a follow-up, so she needed to wait a further eight weeks for a surgical abortion. The abortion was incompletely performed. She suffered prolonged bleeding and infection, and alleged the doctors provided inadequate medical care, and her general practitioner failed to refer to the fact after subsequent visits that she was no longer visibly pregnant.

=== Irish law ===
Article 40.3.3° of the Constitution of Ireland, as inserted by the Eighth Amendment in 1983, provided that "the State acknowledges the right to life of the unborn and, with due regard to the equal right to life of the mother, guarantees in its laws to respect, and, as far as practicable, by its laws to defend and vindicate that right". This was interpreted by the Supreme Court in the X Case (1992) as permitting abortion only where the continuation of a pregnancy would put a woman's life (not merely health or other interests) at risk. Attorney Julie F. Kay argued on behalf of three women identified as "A, B and C" that the restrictions violated their right to not be subject to degrading and humiliating treatment under article 3, their right to respect for their private lives under article 8, a right to an effective national remedy for these rights under article 13 and equal treatment in relation to Convention rights under article 14. C further alleged her right to life, given the danger resulting from prohibiting abortions, was violated under article 2. The Irish government chose to defend the case, its Attorney General Paul Gallagher, pointing out that Ireland's laws had been endorsed in three referendums. He requested the dismissal of the case because no domestic remedies had been sought by A, B or C and that there was no evidence that they interacted with verifiable legal or medical personnel or institutions in Ireland. The women were supported by a host of pro-choice charities, while various anti-abortion groups intervened to support Ireland.

== Judgment ==
The Court held that "Article 8 cannot ... be interpreted as conferring a right to abortion". It nevertheless considered that Ireland had violated article 8 with regard to the third applicant, C, because it was uncertain and unclear whether she could have access to abortion in a situation where she believed that her pregnancy was life-threatening. Rather than information being unavailable, the problem was that there was nowhere C could go to secure a legally authoritative determination of what her rights were in her situation. In this regard it noted the "significant chilling" effect of Irish legislation. All other complaints were dismissed. All of A, B and C's arguments that article 3 (right against inhuman and degrading treatment) as well as C's additional argument that article 2 (right to life) were violated were dismissed as "manifestly ill founded". The claims of A and B on the basis of article 8 were dismissed, because although it recognised the "serious impact of the impugned restriction on the first and second applicants" and that there was consensus 'amongst a substantial majority of the Contracting States' regarding the legality of abortion, the Court did "not consider that this consensus decisively narrows the broad margin of appreciation of the State." Thus Ireland had a broad margin of appreciation to maintain its existing laws where they were sufficiently clear. The Court did not consider it necessary to examine the applicants' complaints separately under Article 14 of the convention.

== Significance ==
Contrary to the hopes or fears of various campaign groups that the case might become a pan-European clone of the US Supreme Court's landmark ruling in the case Roe v Wade, the European Court of Human Rights emphasised there is no straightforward right to an abortion under the convention, and that member states have a broad margin of appreciation to prohibit abortion. However, given the violation of applicant C's right to privacy, the result placed pressure on Ireland to further clarify whether and under which circumstances an abortion may be performed to save the life of a pregnant woman.

== Resolution ==
The Irish government convened an expert group to address the implications of the judgement. The expert group reported to the Department of Health the night before news of the Death of Savita Halappanavar broke.

In 2013, Ireland passed the Protection of Life During Pregnancy Act which the Committee of Ministers of the Council of Europe found closed the case.

== See also ==
- European Convention on Human Rights
- Article 8 of the European Convention on Human Rights
- Roe v Wade 410 U.S. 113 (1973)
- Protection of Life During Pregnancy Act 2013
- Sheila Hodgers
- Eighth Amendment of the Constitution of Ireland
- Abortion in the Republic of Ireland
- Death of Savita Halappanavar
- Attorney General v. X
- D v Ireland
- PP v. HSE
