= Armani Da Silva v United Kingdom =

2010 European Court of Human Rights case

Decided 30 March 2016
- Case: 5878/08
- ECLI: ECLI:CE:ECHR:2016:0330JUD000587808
- Chamber: Grand Chamber

Ruling
- The majority ruled that there was no violation of Article 2.

Court composition
- President; Guido Raimondi
- Judges: Dean Spielmann; Işıl Karakaş; Josep Casadevall; Luis López Guerra; Mark Villiger; Päivi Hirvelä; George Nicolaou; Ledi Bianku; Nebojša Vučinić; Vincent A. De Gaetano; Linos-Alexandre Sicilianos; Paul Mahoney; Krzysztof Wojtyczek; Dmitry Dedov; Branko Lubarda; Yonko Grozev

Legislation affecting
- Offences under the Health and Safety at Work etc. Act 1974

Case opinions
- Majority: Raimondi, Spielmann, Casadevall, Villiger, Hirvelä, Nicolaou, Bianku, Vučinić, De Gaetano, Sicilianos, Mahoney, Lubarda, Grozev.
- Dissent: Karakaş, Wojtyczek, Dedov,
- Dissent: Guerra

Armani Da Silva v United Kingdom is a 2010 European Court of Human Rights case. It concerned the shooting of Jean Charles de Menezes and the right to life.

The Grand Chamber held on a majority of 13 to 4 that there was no violation of Article 2.

== Background ==
Jean Charles de Menezes was a Brazilian electrician that while travelling to work, was shot and killed by officers of the London Metropolitan Police Service at Stockwell station. This was due to the police failing to identify Menezes correctly, believing him to be involved with undetonated bombs that had been found the previous day.

The applicant was Ms Da Silva, the cousin of Jean Charles de Menezes. The case was brought to the European Court of Human Rights since none of the police officers involved in the shooting were prosecuted. To this day, no officers involved in shooting have been prosecuted.

== Judgement and Reasoning ==
The majority ruling of the Court stated that the definition of self-defence in England and Wales was similar to the definition the Court recognised. The Court applied the McCann and Others test in whether the person had an honest and genuine belief that the use of force was necessary.^{para. 248}

The Court could not find across the signatories of the ECHR a suitable evidential burden in deciding whether to prosecute. Therefore, the Court ruled this as within the state's margin of appreciation. The Court followed the decision in Brecknell that states that prosecution is not required when there is no prospect for success.^{para. 271} They upheld previous case law in Gurtekin, which states that even though a crime is particularly serious that does not mean it requires prosecution.^{para. 266} The Court concluded that spending resources on a trial that is likely to fail and not lead to a conviction would undermine public confidence in the state.^{para. 95}

The Court concluded that "it cannot be said that the domestic authorities failed to consider, in a manner compatible with the requirements of Article 2 of the Convention, whether the use of force by Charlie 2 and Charlie 12 was justified in the circumstances."^{para 256} Considering the events at Stockwell happened in a "matter of seconds" and that there "was some independent evidence that supports the officers' accounts that they feared Jean Charles might detonate a bomb"^{para 254}

The Court concluded:

The decision not to prosecute any individual officer was not due to any failings in the investigation or the state's tolerance of or collusion in unlawful acts. Rather, it was due to the fact that, following a thorough investigation, a prosecutor had considered all the facts of the case and concluded that there was insufficient evidence against any individual officer to prosecute.^{para 284}

There were four judges who dissented from the majority in two separate opinions, Judges Karakas, Wojtyczek and Dedov focused on a different standard of self-defence, surrounding strict necessity and unavoidability.

The three dissenting judges considered the majority had erred by "putting the emphasis on the objective element". They argued that established case law rested on a subjective condition – an honest belief which subsequently turns out to be mistaken in addition to an objective element. They highlighted a worry that similar application in this case would result in "de facto immunity from prosecution"

Another judge, Judge Lopez Guerra, also dissented, focusing on the fact that no individual responsibility has been derived, even though institutionalised criminal responsibility was declared in the IPCC report.

== Criticism ==
This decision has been criticised. It has been argued that the Court "watered down the objective tenet of the McCann test" as the test originally required "an honest belief which is perceived for good reasons." Here, the Court stated that "existence of good reasons should be determined subjectively.^{para 245}" It also suggested that it never regarded "reasonableness as a separate requirement but rather as a relevant factor in determining whether a belief was honestly and genuinely held."^{para 246} This test has been argued as being inappropriate for determining the responsibility of the State and allow them to escape culpability.

The dissenting opinion has also been criticised in that the requirement of "absolute necessity" would often leave an impossible burden for the police to overcome. If police officers could only take action when absolutely certain, it would often be too late and other members of the public may be killed or injured.
