= Oršuš and Others v. Croatia =

- Court: European Court of Human Rights
- Decided: 16 March 2010

Case history
- Prior actions: CC of Croatia judgment in favour of government; ECtHR Chamber judgment in favour of applicants on article 6, in favour of government on article 14 and P1-2

Court membership
- Judges sitting: Jean-Paul Costa, Nicolas Bratza, Françoise Tulkens, Josep Casadevall, Karel Jungwiert, Nina Vajić, Anatoly Kovler, Elisabeth Steiner, Alvina Gyulumyan, Renate Jaeger, Egbert Myjer, David Thór Björgvinsson, Ineta Ziemele, Isabelle Berro-Lefèvre, Mirjana Lazarova Trajkovska, Işıl Karakaş, Nebojša Vučinić

Case opinions
- Majority: Costa, Bratza, Tulkens, Casadevall, Steiner, Björgvinsson, Ziemele, Trajkovska, Karakaş; Joint partial dissent: Jungwiert, Vajić, Kovler, Gyulumyan, Jaeger, Myjer, Berro-Lefèvre, Vučinić

Keywords
- Right to education, language, discrimination

Oršuš and Others v. Croatia (15766/03) was a case heard before the European Court of Human Rights, concerning activities of Roma-only classes in some schools of Croatia, which were held legal by the Constitutional Court of Croatia in 2007 by a decision no. U-III-3138/2002.

== Chamber judgment ==
On 17 July 2008, the Chamber of Court's First Section found unanimously both that there had been a violation of Article 6 of the European Convention on Human Rights on account of the excessive length of the proceedings, and that there had not been a violation of Article 2 of Protocol No. 1 (right to education) taken alone or in conjunction with Article 14 of the Convention (ban of discrimination).

== Grand Chamber judgment ==
On 16 March 2010, the court delivered the judgment, finding a violation of Article 6, unanimously, and a violation of Article 14 of ECHR read in conjunction with Article 2 of Protocol No. 1, by nine votes to eight. The majority has considered that the schooling arrangements for Roma children were not sufficiently attended by safeguards that would ensure that, in the exercise of its margin of appreciation in the education sphere, the State had sufficient regard to their special needs as members of a disadvantaged group and as a result of the arrangements the applicants were placed in separate classes where an adapted curriculum was followed, though its exact content remains unclear. Owing to the lack of transparency and clear criteria as regards transfer to mixed classes, the applicants stayed in Roma-only classes for substantial periods of time, sometimes even during their entire primary schooling (Para. 182).

Judges Jungwiert, Vajić, Kovler, Gyulumyan, Jaeger, Myjer, Berro-Lefèvre and Vučinić have filed a joint partly dissenting opinion, finding no violation of Articles 14 and P1-2. They referred to interests of Croatian-speaking children (Para. 9) and right of minority to preserve diversity (para. 17), pointing that:

- applicants agreed they lacked the required level of language proficiency (Para. 4),
- the Roma-only classes were not established as a rule (Para. 6),
- the slow linguistic development and progress in the applicants' case was to a large degree due to their very poor school attendance (Para. 7),
- pupils who at times or during their entire primary education attend Roma-only classes and successfully complete final grade also receive the same standard final certificate which in no way indicates that they attended some special, separate classes (para. 11).

== Aftermath ==
According to ERRC evaluation after a visit to Croatia in June 2010, "The situation in the schools remains the same; the majority of Romani children continue to attend Roma-only classes. The ERRC even identified one more school in the village of Podturen where Romani children are attending Roma-only classes. The situation for applicants in the Oršuš case themselves is little improved and they have been reportedly threatened with the possibility of having their social benefits cut because of their damages award. The only positive development was an initiative coming from the directors of the primary schools at the heart of the case which asked Medjimurje county authorities and the Ministry of Education to introduce three-year, free of charge pre-school programmes for Romani children to help these children to overcome language barriers before beginning their primary education".

In March, 2011, Amnesty International has filed a submission to the Committee of Ministers of the Council of Europe concerning implementation of the judgment, where it found several shortcomings.

== See also ==
- List of Romani rights cases before international courts and quasi-judicial bodies
