= A. and Others v. the United Kingdom =

2009 European Court of Human Rights case

Decided 19 February 2009
- Case: 3455/05
- ECLI: ECLI:CE:ECHR:2009:0219JUD000345505
- Chamber: Grand Chamber

Ruling
- The majority found a violation of Article 5 (1), (4) and (5) regarding some of the applicants of the case.

Court composition
- President; Jean-Paul Costa
- Judges: Christos Rozakis; Nicolas Bratza; Françoise Tulkens; Josep Casadevall; Giovanni Bonello; Ireneu Cabral Barreto; Elisabeth Steiner; Lech Garlicki; Khanlar Hajiyev; Ljiljana Mijović; Egbert Myjer; Davíd Thór Björgvinsson; George Nicolaou; Ledi Bianku; Nona Tsotsoria; Mihai Poalelungi

Legislation affecting
- Part 4 of the 2001 Anti-Terrorism, Crime and Security Act

Case opinions
- Majority: Costa, Rozakis, Bratza, Tulkens, Casadevall, Bonello, Barreto, Steiner, Garlicki, Hajiyev, Mijović, Myjer, Björgvinsson, Nicolaou, Bianku, Tsotsoria, Poalelungi

A. and Others v United Kingdom is a human rights case decided on 19 February 2009 by the European Court of Human Rights. It unanimously held that holding prisoners indefinitely under the Anti-terrorism, Crime and Security Act 2001 was incompatible with Article 5.

== Background ==
In the aftermath of the September 11 attacks, eleven men were detained in HMP Belmarsh under the Anti-terrorism, Crime and Security Act 2001. They were alleged to be involved in extreme Islamic terrorist groups and were suspected of financially supporting them. Given that deporting them would give rise to ill-treatment, they were detained without trial. Eight of the applicants remained in Belmarsh until the Act was repealed by Parliament in 2005.

== Judgment and reasoning ==
Following the decision in the House of Lords, the applicants were still kept in detention and therefore applied to the European Court on Human Rights. Scholars have argued that the House of Lords judgment prepared the ground for the judgment of the European Court of Human Rights.

The Court unanimously ruled that the applicant's detention did not fall within the exception to the right of liberty set out in Article 5 (1)(f) as it was not possible to deport them. The Government argued that Article 5 allows a balance between the right to liberty and the protection of national security from a terrorist threat. The Court stated that the derogating circumstances under Article 15 are judged based on the exigencies of the situation. Much like the House of Lords, the Court considered these measures were disproportionate and discriminatory to non-nationals, as the Act only applied to non-British nationals and in principle the terrorist threat is posed equally by nationals and non-nationals. The Court, therefore, found a violation for nine of the applicants.

The Court also found a violation of Article 5(4) in regarding four of the applicants, since due process was not satisfied during the proceedings. Some of the evidence used against the applicants was not disclosed to them and the advocates of the Special Immigration Appeals Commission could not communicate with their clients.

The Court also found a violation of Article 5(5), in providing compensation for unlawful detention, for all the applicants, except two.

As the applicants had domestic remedies to complain about their detention conditions, but did not make use of them, the Court found no violation of Article 3.

== Significance ==
This case has been argued as being "pivotal and an important statement on how far we can treat suspected foreign terrorists differently from criminal suspects." It also highlighted the importance of the judiciary assessing the legality of the government decisions. Lord Hope stated that the judiciary holding the government to account is "a cardinal feature of the modern democratic state."

The Anti-terrorism, Crime and Security Act 2001 was replaced by the Prevention of Terrorism Act 2005, which was then later repealed by the Terrorism Prevention and Investigation Measures Act 2011.

== Books ==
- Dothan, Shai (2014). Reputation and Judicial Tactics: A Theory of National and International Courts. Cambridge University Press. ISBN 978-1-107-03113-5.
