= Case of Hirsi Jamaa and Others v. Italy =

2012 European Court of Human Rights case

Decided September 2012
- Full case name: Hirsi Jamaa and Others v. Italy
- Case: 27765/09
- ECLI: https://hudoc.echr.coe.int/sites/eng/?i=001-109231
- Chamber: Grand Chamber
- Language of proceedings: English
- Nationality of parties: Italian, Somali, Eritrean

Ruling
- The Italian Government infringed the principle of prohibition on inhuman or degrading treatment, prohibition of collective expulsion, and the right to an effective remedy. The court required Italy to pay those affected 1,600 Euros.

Court composition
- President; Nicolas Bratza
- Judges: Jean-Paul Costa; Françoise Tulkens; Josep Casadevall; Nina Vajić; Dean Spielmann; Peer Lorenzen; Ljiljana Mijović; Dragoljub Popović; Giorgio Malinverni; Mirjana Lazarova Trajkovska; Nona Tsotsoria; Işıl Karakaş; Kristina Pardalos; Guido Raimondi; Vincent A. De Gaetano; Paulo Pinto de Albuquerque

Keywords
- Violation of Article 3 of the Convention; Violation of Article 4 of Protocol Number 4; Inhuman or degrading treatment; Article 13; Right to an effective remedy

In the case of Hirsi Jamaa and Others v. Italy (application no. 27765/09), before the European Court of Human Rights, the Grand Chamber of the Court found in February 2012 that by returning migrants to Libya, without examining their case, the state of Italy exposed the migrants to the risk of ill-treatment and amounted to a collective expulsion. The case concerned 24 migrants from Somalia end Eritrea that were travelling from Libya to Italy that were intercepted at sea by Italian authorities who sent them back to Libya.

== Background ==
The case of Hirsi Jamaa and Others v. Italy concerned eleven Somali nationals and thirteen individuals from Eritrea which were part of a larger group of approximately two hundred migrants that left from Libya, headed towards Italy, on three boats in the spring of 2009. The boats were intercepted by Italian flagged vessels of the Italian customs and coastguard, while within the jurisdiction of Maltese maritime search and rescue region, on 6 May 2009. Passengers of the boats were transferred by Italian military vessels to Tripoli, Libya, where they were handed over to local authorities. Applicants of the case claimed that while travelling back to Tripoli, they had not been informed by the Italian authorities where they were being taken. Neither were the identities of passengers checked by the Italian authorities according to the applicants.

Before the Court, applicants of the case and their representatives claimed that the Italian authorities had put them in the risk of being sent back to Somalia or Eritrea, their countries of origin, which also would put them at risk of ill-treatment in their native countries. The applicants also put forward complaints before the court, regarding that they had been subject to collective expulsion which is prohibited by Article 4 of Protocol No. 4. Lastly, the applicants of the case complained that they had not had effective remedy in Italy against the alleged violations of Article 3 of the Convention and of Article 4 of the before mentioned Protocol.

Hearing of the case took place before the Grand Chamber of the European Court of Human Rights on 22 June 2011. Several third parties were invited to attend the hearing, amongst which were organisations such as the United Nations High Commissioner for Human Rights, Amnesty International and Human Rights Watch.

== Judgement ==
The Grand Chamber of the European Court of Human Rights reached a unanimous conclusion in September 2012 on several grounds in the case of Hirsi Jamaa and Others v. Italy. Firstly, the Grand Chamber found that the applicants fell within the jurisdiction of Italy according to Article 1 of the European Convention of Human Rights. Secondly, the Grand Chamber found that two violations had been made of Article 3 of the convention, on the prohibition of inhuman or degrading treatment, as the applicants had been exposed to a risk of ill-treatment in Libya and the risk of repatriation to the countries of Eritrea and Somalia. Thirdly, Article 4 of Protocol Number 4 on the prohibition of collective expulsion had been violated. Finally, the Grand Chamber also found that Article 13, on the right to an effective remedy, had also been violated when taken in conjunction with Article 3 and 4 of the before mentioned protocol.

In addition to the before mentioned, Italian authorities were held to pay 15,000 Euros to each of the applicants concerned, in respect of non-pecuniary damage, and an additional amount of close to 1,600 Euros to be paid jointly to the applicants, to cover costs and expenses. The judgement, which was final, was made on 23 February 2012 in the Grand Chamber of the ECHR in Strasbourg. The judgement was given by seventeen judges of the Grand Chamber, of which Nicolas Bratza from the United Kingdom was president. One judge, Pinto de Albuquerque, expressed a concurring opinion.

== Grounds for the Courts' findings ==
Amongst the grounds on which the court based its judgement was that the migrants, the applicants of the case, were without doubt within Italian jurisdiction when their pushback to Libya was made. The court did not accept the description of the exercise that was made by the Italian government, which claimed it was a "rescue operation in the high seas". On the contrary, the individuals were according to the courts' findings, under the jurisdiction of Italian authorities, even though the authorities exercised their control and authority over the applicants outside of Italian territory. Secondly, the Court found that Italian authorities should have known that the migrants would be exposed to ill-treatment. This was for example based on the observation of the Court which found that domestic law and ratification of international treaties, that are meant to guarantee respect for fundamental human rights, were not sufficient in Libya.

Thirdly, the court also found that the applicants might have been exposed to ill-treatment, both in Libya and in their countries of origin. The court found that there was "widespread insecurity" in Somalia and in Eritrea where individuals might be faced with torture and other inhumane treatment and conditions, as a result of having left the country irregularly. Furthermore, the court also found that there was no form of protection system for asylum seekers in Libya, in addition to the fact that the Geneva Convention had not been ratified by Libyan authorities. Therefore, the applicants might just as well be at risk of ill-treatment in Libya, according to The Courts' findings.

Regarding the complaint of expulsion, The Court found that as a result of the pushback to Libya having been exercised outside of the national territory of Italy, The Court found that the exercise of the Italian government did indeed take the form of collective expulsion. In addition, The Court found that despite the "special nature" of the maritime environment, the act did not take place in an area outside the law. Finally, The Court found that Italian authorities had not carried out a check of the identities or individual circumstances of the applicants, resulting in Italian authorities' actions to be of collective nature towards the migrants, which is in breach of Article 4 of Protocol No. 4.

== Reactions ==
In a press conference on 7 May 2009, Italian minister of the interior, claimed that the action carried out by the Italian authorities the day before were in accordance with bilateral agreements between the two countries of Italy and Libya that had come into force earlier the same year. Almost two years later, on 26 February 2011, the Italian minister of defence declared that the before mentioned bilateral agreements would be suspended as a result of change of events in Libya.

The ruling of the ECHR Grand Chamber in the Case of Hirsi Jamaa and Others v. Italy has been phrased by human rights activists as a great victory. Amnesty International for example, claimed in a press release that the judgment was "historic" and that it "upholds migrants' rights". Since the judgment of The Court, major human rights organisations have continued to document human rights abuses made against refugees and migrants in Libya. Human Rights Watch and Amnesty International have for example condemned Italy's and the EU's cooperation with Libyan authorities and the EU's support to the Libyan government to tackle matters of migration. Others have highlighted that Hirsi Jamaa and Others v. Italy is the very first case in which the ECHR delivers a judgment on interception-at-sea and have claimed that the case was crucial for the rights of irregular migrants.

Furthermore, the case has raised the attention of scholars, for example regarding the matter of jurisdiction. It has for example been argued that the duties of Italy under ECHR were triggered only because the vessel of migrants came under the control of Italian official agents. Had that not been the case, Italy's duty towards the migrants might not have been invoked. The case has also been said to be of significant value to European jurisprudence on subjects such as the extraterritorial application of human rights as well as the rules of governing interdiction of persons at the high seas. Furthermore, scholars have claimed that, that with its judgement, it appears that the European Court of Human Rights has clarified the law of maritime interdiction and non-refoulement in the European Union, making the case an important milestone in regards to the obligations of European countries' obligations towards the human rights of migrants.
