= Hirsi =

Hirsi is a surname and given name. Notable people with the name include:

== Surname ==
- Aden Ibrahim Aw Hirsi (born 1978), Somali politician and author
- Bader Ben Hirsi (born 1968), English playwright and director
- Daud Abdulle Hirsi (1925–1965), Somali police and military officer
- Isra Hirsi (born 2003), American environmental activist
- Nur Farah Hirsi, Somali politician

== Given name ==
- Ayaan Hirsi Ali (born 1969), Somali-born Dutch-American writer
- Hirsi Ali Magan (1935–2008), Somali scholar
- Hirsi Bulhan Farah, Somali politician
- Hirsi Said Farah Gataa, (1950–2017), Somali general
- Ridwan Hirsi Mohamed, Somali politician

== See also ==
- Case of Hirsi Jamaa and Others v. Italy, 2012 European Court of Human Rights case
