= O'Halloran and Francis v. United Kingdom =

2007 European Court of Human Rights case

Decided 29 June 2007
- Full case name: O'HALLORAN AND FRANCIS v. THE UNITED KINGDOM
- ECLI: [2007] ECHR 545, (2008) 46 EHRR 21
- Chamber: Grand Chamber
- Language of proceedings: English
- Nationality of parties: British

Ruling
- Automobile owners do not have the right to remain silent when asked by police to identify a speeding driver

Court composition
- President; Jean-Paul Costa
- Judges: Luzius Wildhaber; Christos Rozakis; Nicolas Bratza; Boštjan Zupančič; Rıza Türmen; Volodymyr Butkevych; Josep Casadevall; Matti Pellonpää; Snejana Botoucharova; Stanislav Pavlovschi; Lech Garlicki; Javier Borrego Borrego; Alvina Gyulumyan; Ljiljana Mijović; Egbert Myjer; Ján Šikuta

Instruments cited
- Article 6

O'Halloran and Francis v. United Kingdom was a 2007 European Court of Human Rights case. The case revolved around a challenge to a requirement in the United Kingdom's Road Traffic Act 1988 that owners of a speeding vehicle provide police with the name of the driver. The plaintiffs, two British citizens, argued that the requirement was a violation of Article 6 of the European Convention on Human Rights, under which there exists an implied right to remain silent. In a departure from previous rulings on the issue, the court ruled in a 15–2 majority that the Road Traffic Act requirement was not unreasonable and that there was therefore no Human Rights violation.

== Background ==
The cars of Gerard O'Halloran and Idris Francis were caught speeding in 2000 and 2001 respectively, with Francis' vehicle caught doing 47 mph in a 30 mph zone, and O'Halloran's doing 69 mph in a temporary 40 mph zone on the M11 motorway. Both violations were captured via speed cameras. Under section 172 of the Road Traffic Act 1988, the two were obliged to provide the names and addresses of the drivers when the police enquired of them via a notice of intended prosecution. Francis claimed he had the right to remain silent to avoid self-incrimination under European law and refused to provide the information. O'Halloran confirmed he was driving but later attempted to withdraw his confession at the Magistrates' court under Article 6 of the European Convention on Human Rights.

Both were convicted and fined. The magistrate refused to allow O'Halloran's confession to be withdrawn and he was fined a total of £250 including costs with six penalty points put on his driving licence. He applied for a judicial review but this was denied. Francis was convicted and fined a total of £1,000 including costs with three penalty points added to his licence.

== Case ==
Both car owners appealed to the European Court of Human Rights asserting they had an absolute right to silence under European law. The British government opposed, on grounds previously outlined by the country's Judicial Committee of the Privy Council, that any implied right to silence in Article 6 must be balanced against the need to discourage dangerous driving.

The court ruled in favour of the government, reasoning that vehicle owners and drivers had implicitly agreed to comply with legal regulations relating to motoring. They did rule that was compatible as the Road Traffic Act did allow for the defence that the accused would be able to show they did not know who was driving providing they had carried out due diligence in attempting to identify them. In terms of the individual cases, the court ruled that O'Halloran's statement being admitted was lawful as prosecutors still had to prove beyond reasonable doubt that the offence was committed and the defendant was still entitled to call witnesses and supply their own evidence to counter it. In Francis' case, the court ruled that his refusal to make a statement constituted the offence itself, so the question of his refusing to make the statement could not be used as evidence in the case.

In summing up, the court dismissed the appeal on the grounds that drivers agreed to comply with regulations when they drove and that the information the police sought was minimal, thus there was no right to remain silent. 14 judges agreed with this with Judge Borrego Borrego concurring but arguing the case judgment should have been shorter. Judges Pavlovschi and Myjer filed separate dissents. Pavlovschi argued that there was a breach of Article 6 and the appeal should have been upheld, arguing people would be forced to walk or use bikes in order to avoid risking a breach of their rights under the law. Myjer concurred with the dissent and elaborated upon them arguing that the state did not have a right to compel people to provide information in exchange for the right of driving a vehicle.
