= Oliari and Others v. Italy =

Decided 21 July 2015
- Nationality of parties: Italian

Ruling
- Same-sex couples have a positive right under the Convention to have their relationships recognized by the State

Court composition
- President; Päivi Hirvelä
- Judges: Guido Raimondi; Ledi Bianku; Nona Tsotsoria; Paul Mahoney; Faris Vehabović; Yonko Grozev

Instruments cited
- Article 8

Oliari and Others v. Italy (Application nos. 18766/11 and 36030/11) is a case decided in 2015 by the European Court of Human Rights (ECtHR) in which the Court established a positive obligation upon member states to provide legal recognition for same-sex couples.

== Background ==
The ECtHR previously held in Schalk and Kopf v. Austria (2010) that the Convention does not oblige member states to open marriage to same-sex couples, but if there is a different type of partnership scheme, same-sex couples may not be excluded per Vallianatos and Others v. Greece (2013).

Same-sex marriage is not legal in Italy, nor did the country at the time of the case provide any other type of recognition for either opposite-sex or same-sex couples.

The applicants were three same-sex couples who submitted their cases in 2011 after Italian courts rejected their requests to have their marriage recognized.

== Judgment ==
The Court held that Italy, by not legally recognizing same-sex relationships, violated Article 8 of the European Convention on Human Rights ("Right to respect for private and family life").

In the review of relevant law, the Court also referenced Obergefell v. Hodges, a United States Supreme Court ruling legalising same-sex marriage, which was published just a few days before the ECtHR deliberated in Oliari and Others v. Italy.

However, the ECtHR found that, despite the evolution of states in favour of legalising same-sex marriage, there was no violation of Article 12 (right to marry), and thus confirmed its previous ruling in Schalk and Kopf v. Austria (2010).

== Aftermath ==
In May 2016, almost one year after the Court's ruling, the Italian Parliament passed a civil unions law, which grants same-sex couples all of the legal protections enjoyed by opposite-sex married couples. The law came into effect in June of the same year.

== See also ==
- Recognition of same-sex unions in Europe
- Recognition of same-sex unions in Italy
- List of LGBT-related cases before international courts and quasi-judicial bodies
