= Article 15 of the European Convention on Human Rights =

Provision of human rights code

Article 15 of the European Convention on Human Rights allows contracting states to derogate from certain rights guaranteed by the Convention in a time of "war or other public emergency threatening the life of the nation".

Article 15 of the ECHR states:

1. In time of war or other public emergency threatening the life of the nation any High Contracting Party may take measures derogating from its obligations under this Convention to the extent strictly required by the exigencies of the situation, provided that such measures are not inconsistent with its other obligations under international law.
2. No derogation from Article 2, except in respect of deaths resulting from lawful acts of war, or from Articles 3, 4 (paragraph 1) and 7 shall be made under this provision.
3. Any High Contracting Party availing itself of this right of derogation shall keep the Secretary General of the Council of Europe fully informed of the measures which it has taken and the reasons therefore. It shall also inform the Secretary General of the Council of Europe when such measures have ceased to operate and the provisions of the Convention are again being fully executed.

== Conditions ==
Permissible derogations under article 15 must meet three substantive conditions:

1. there must be a public emergency threatening the life of the nation;
2. any measures taken in response must be "strictly required by the exigencies of the situation"; and
3. the measures taken in response to it must be in compliance with a state's other obligations under international law.

In addition to these substantive requirements, the derogation must be procedurally sound. There must be some formal announcement of the derogation and notice of the derogation and any measures adopted under it, and the ending of the derogation must be communicated to the Secretary-General of the Council of Europe.

=== "War or other public emergency threatening the life of the nation" ===
While the Court has not explicitly interpreted the term "war", any substantial violence or unrest, even falling short of full-scale war, is likely to qualify under a "public emergency threatening the life of the nation". Several cases have been crucial to the interpretation of Article 15. The phrase "public emergency threatening the life of the nation" was initially defined in the landmark case of Lawless v. Ireland (no. 3) (1961), and further elaborated upon in subsequent jurisprudence, notably “the Greek case”, which established key criteria for qualifying an emergency as a "public emergency". These criteria, drawn from case law and the Court's definitions, provide a comprehensive framework for understanding the scope and limitations of Article 15. Accordingly, for a derogation itself to be valid, the emergency giving rise to it must be:

- actual or imminent, although states do not have to wait for disasters to strike before taking preventive measures;
- involve the whole nation, although a threat confined to a particular region may be treated as "threatening the life of the nation" in that particular region;
- threaten the continuance of the organised life of the community;
- exceptional such that measures and restriction permitted by the convention would be "plainly inadequate" to deal with the emergency.

Additionally, in cases like Ireland v. the United Kingdom (1978), the Court held that the situation of terrorism in Northern Ireland constituted a public emergency threatening the life of the nation, justifying derogations from certain Convention rights. Similarly, in Aksoy v. Turkey (1996), the Court recognized the PKK terrorist activity in South-East Turkey as meeting the threshold of a public emergency. Moreover, the aftermath of the 9/11 attacks in the United States, as seen in A. and Others v. the United Kingdom (2009), was considered an imminent threat justifying derogations, even though it went on to find that measures taken by the United Kingdom under that derogation were disproportionate. While the Court generally accords a wide margin of appreciation to national authorities in determining the existence of an emergency, it maintains supervisory oversight to ensure compliance with Convention standards.

=== "Measures ... strictly required by the exigencies of the situation" ===
While states hold primary responsibility for determining the existence of a public emergency and the necessary derogations from human rights, the Court has the authority to assess if these measures are strictly required and consistent with international law obligations. This principle is underscored in cases such as Ireland v. the United Kingdom (1978) and Mehmet Hasan Altan v. Turkey (2018), where the Court clarified the margin of appreciation granted to states while also ensuring the protection of democratic values. Factors such as the nature of the rights affected, the circumstances leading to the emergency, and its duration are considered in the Court's evaluation, as demonstrated in cases like Brannigan and McBride v. the United Kingdom (1993) and A. and Others v. the United Kingdom (2009).

=== "Not inconsistent with [the High Contracting Party’s] other obligations under international law" ===
The ECtHR ensures compliance with international legal standards regarding derogations from human rights during emergencies. As affirmed in Lawless v. Ireland (no. 3) (1961), the Court has the authority to independently review Article 15 § 1 derogations, ensuring compliance with international legal standards. In Brannigan and McBride v. the United Kingdom (1993), the ECtHR clarified that derogations need not always entail formal proclamation, recognizing "official statements" as sufficient indication. Marshall v. the United Kingdom (dec.) (2001) established that prolonged emergency measures do not per se violate international legal obligations. Hassan v. the United Kingdom [GC] (2014) demonstrated the ECtHR's flexibility in interpreting Convention provisions in alignment with principles of international humanitarian law, even in the absence of formal derogations. Georgia v. Russia (II) [GC] (2021) outlined the ECtHR's methodical approach to reconciling ECHR obligations with international humanitarian law in armed conflict situations.

== Invocations of Article 15 ==
Most recently, Ukraine invoked Article 15, following Russia's full-scale aggression in 2022 and establishment of martial law in the country. On 4 April 2024, as part of its regular communication with the Council of Europe regarding this matter, Ukraine significantly reduced the derogation and notified the Secretary General that it will no longer cover Articles 4.3 (related to forced or compulsory labor), 9 (freedom of thought, conscience and religion), 13 (right to an effective remedy), 14 (prohibition of discrimination) and 16 (restrictions on political activity of aliens) of the ECHR.

The COVID-19 pandemic has led to a significant but uneven invocation of Article 15, with ten new derogations: Latvia, Romania, Armenia, the Republic of Moldova, Estonia, Georgia, Albania, North Macedonia, Serbia, and San Marino. It is worth noting that while many states have introduced similar measures to tackle the pandemic, only 10 states have derogated, with Eastern European states predominating. This could be due to differences in domestic legal systems, as some are better aligned with international law.

As of 2024, eight additional States parties to the ECHR – Albania, Armenia, France, Georgia, Greece, Ireland, Turkey, and the United Kingdom – have exercised their right of derogation. Among them, Greece, Ireland, the United Kingdom, and Turkey have been required to provide justifications for the measures implemented, ensuring compliance with Convention standards.

== Cases ==
The following cases are relevant to Article 15 ECHR:

- Greece v. the United Kingdom (1958)
- Lawless v. Ireland (no. 3) (1961)
- Denmark, Norway, Sweden and the Netherlands v. Greece (“The Greek Case”) (1969)
- Ireland v. the United Kingdom (1978)
- Cyprus v. Turkey (1983)
- Brannigan and McBride v. the United Kingdom (1993)
- Aksoy v. Turkey (1996)
- A. and Others v. the United Kingdom (2009)
- Hassan v. the United Kingdom (2014)
- Şahin Alpay v. Turkey and Mehmet Hasan Altan v. Turkey (2018)
- Pişkin v. Turkey (2020)
- Dareskizb Ltd v. Armenia (2021)

== Reception ==
The Court's permissive approach to emergencies has raised criticism in academic scholarship, arguing that it should give more scrutiny to the validity of derogations in order to prevent their use as an escape clause for human rights.
