= Full court =

Court of law with a greater than normal number of judges

A full court (less formally, full bench) is a court of law sitting with a greater than normal number of judges. In Europe, this practice is often referred to as the Grand Chamber. For a court which is usually presided over by one judge, a full court has three or more judges; for a court which, like many appellate courts, normally sits as a bench of three judges, a full court has a bench of five (or more) judges.

The expression originated in England but seems largely to have fallen into disuse there, and instead the technical term "divisional court" is used when referring to a multi-judge panel in the High Court of England and Wales.

However, the term is still used in Scotland, such as in the Court of Criminal Appeal, and in many other Commonwealth jurisdictions, such as Australia, (Note: See, for example, the Judiciary Act 1903, section 19, in relation to the High Court of Australia.) New Zealand, (Note: See the Senior Courts Act 2016, sections 47, 50.) South Africa, India, Pakistan, etc. Although possible, a full court typically does not involve the participation of all the judges of the court, a practice known in the United States as the court sitting en banc. An example of an exception, where the participation of all the appointed judges is the usual composition for main hearings, is the High Court of Australia.

The term reflects the practice, before permanent appeal courts were established, of appeals from decisions of trial courts being heard by several judges of the same court (usually excluding the judge who handed down the original decision). Technically, a judgment of a full court is at the same level of the judicial hierarchy as the decision appealed from and may, depending on how the doctrine of precedent applies to that particular court, not bind future courts at that level. However, the greater number of judges involved, and the fact that it is an appeal, may make it almost as persuasive, in practice, as a judgment of the same number of judges in a higher court.

A recent comparative law scholarship suggests that convening a full court enhances the legitimacy of a court’s rulings by ensuring the quality and consistency of its jurisprudence and by signalling collective judicial agreement on matters of major importance.

The historical trend to create separate courts of appeal, with permanent rather than ad hoc appellate judges, has reduced the need for the use of full courts. However, they are still sometimes found in cases of great significance for which there is no possibility or likelihood of a further appeal. (Note: Recent (rare) examples at the level of the House of Lords include the second Pinochet extradition case and the challenge to the use of evidence obtained by torture, in both of which a panel of seven judges sat rather than the usual five. The UK Supreme Court, which in 2009 succeeded to the judicial functions of the House of Lords, has adopted a more frequent practice of sitting as a bench of seven or even nine judges in important cases, but it does not appear to use the term "full court" to refer to that practice. Exceptionally, in R (Miller) v the Secretary of State for Exiting the European Union and in Cherry and Ors v Lord Advocate, the Supreme Court sat with 11 justices. This is the largest panel convened by a British court in recent history.)

== See also ==
- Judicial panel
