= A v Secretary of State for the Home Department =

UK human rights case

A v SS for Home Department
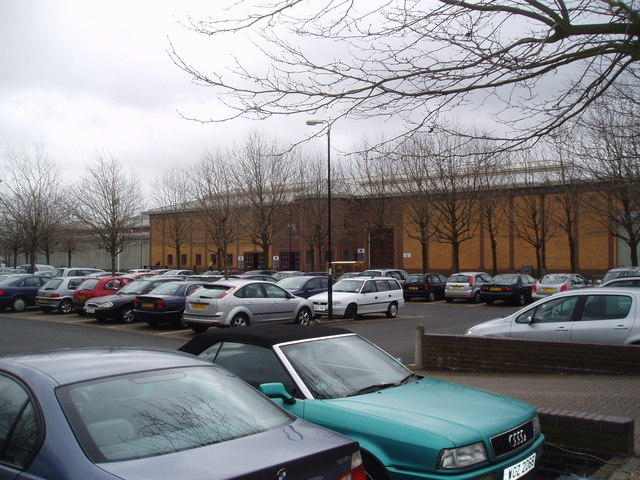
- Court: House of Lords
- Full case name: A and others v Secretary of State for the Home Department; X and another v Secretary of State for the Home Department
- Citation: [2004] UKHL 56

Keywords
- Indefinite detention, right to trial

A and others v Secretary of State for the Home Department [2004] UKHL 56 (also known as the Belmarsh 9 case) is a UK human rights case heard before the House of Lords. It held that the indefinite detention of foreign prisoners in Belmarsh without trial under section 23 of the Anti-terrorism, Crime and Security Act 2001 was incompatible with the European Convention on Human Rights.

The case should not be confused with the case A v Secretary of State for the Home Department (No 2) [2005] UKHL 71, which relates to the use of evidence obtained by torture in British courts.

== Facts ==
The case began with nine men who challenged a decision of the Special Immigration Appeals Commission to eject them from the country on the basis that there was evidence that they threatened national security.

Of the nine appellants, all except two were detained in December 2001; the others were detained in February and April 2002 respectively. All were detained under the Anti-terrorism, Crime and Security Act 2001. Part 4 of the Act provided for their indefinite detention without trial and deportation. However, the power was only applied to non-British nationals. Under section 25 of this Act, they had the right to appeal to the Special Immigration Appeals Commission against their detention.

== Judgment ==
The House of Lords held by a majority (Lord Bingham of Cornhill, Lord Nicholls of Birkenhead, Lord Hope of Craighead, Lord Scott of Foscote, Lord Rodger of Earlsferry, Baroness Hale of Richmond and Lord Carswell) that, whilst their detention was lawful under the ATCSA 2001, section 23 was incompatible with the articles of the European Convention on Human Rights. As a consequence, the House of Lords made a declaration of incompatibility under section 4 of the Human Rights Act 1998, and allowed the appeals.

Lord Bingham said in relation to the application of Art.15 ECHR and whether there was a public emergency threatening the life of the nation:

29. The more purely political (in a broad or narrow sense) a question is, the more appropriate it will be for political resolution and the less likely it is to be an appropriate matter for judicial decision. The smaller, therefore, will be the potential role of the court. It is the function of political and not judicial bodies to resolve political questions.

Lord Hoffmann dissented in strong terms, but agreed that the appeals should be allowed. Whereas the majority argued that the 2001 Act was contrary to the ECHR because it discriminated between nationals and foreign nationals (Art.14 ECHR), Lord Hoffmann stated that the whole scheme was incompatible with the United Kingdom's constitution, and its commitment to human rights. He dismissed the government's argument that under the ECHR and HRA it was possible to derogate from the ECHR's general provisions. His view was that the test – that there was a "threat to the life of the nation" – was not fulfilled.

96. This is a nation which has been tested in adversity, which has survived physical destruction and catastrophic loss of life. I do not underestimate the ability of fanatical groups of terrorists to kill and destroy, but they do not threaten the life of the nation. Whether we would survive Hitler hung in the balance, but there is no doubt that we shall survive Al-Qaeda. The Spanish people have not said that what happened in Madrid, hideous crime as it was, threatened the life of their nation. Their legendary pride would not allow it. Terrorist violence, serious as it is, does not threaten our institutions of government or our existence as a civil community.
97. For these reasons I think that the Special Immigration Appeals Commission made an error of law and that the appeal ought to be allowed. Others of your Lordships who are also in favour of allowing the appeal would do so, not because there is no emergency threatening the life of the nation, but on the ground that a power of detention confined to foreigners is irrational and discriminatory. I would prefer not to express a view on this point. I said that the power of detention is at present confined to foreigners and I would not like to give the impression that all that was necessary was to extend the power to United Kingdom citizens as well. In my opinion, such a power in any form is not compatible with our constitution. The real threat to the life of the nation, in the sense of a people living in accordance with its traditional laws and political values, comes not from terrorism but from laws such as these. That is the true measure of what terrorism may achieve. It is for Parliament to decide whether to give the terrorists such a victory.

Lord Walker of Gestingthorpe also dissented, but would have dismissed the appeal. In his opinion, the discrimination was justified due to "sound, rational grounds for different treatment". While the indefinite detention provisions were a "grave concern", they were "necessary" and accompanied by "several important safeguards against oppression". He therefore held that Part 4 of the 2001 Act was "proportionate, rational and non-discriminatory".

== Significance ==
Parliament decided to replace Part 4 of ATCSA 2001 with the Prevention of Terrorism Act 2005. This allows anyone of any nationality to be subjected to a control order.

This case was eventually appealed to the European Court of Human Rights. That case was also decided in favour of the applicants.

== Notes ==
- A v Secretary of State for the Home Department [2004] UKHL 56, on whether persons can be detained indefinitely without reasons being given for that detention.
