= Right to silence in England and Wales =

Protection during criminal proceedings

The right to silence in England and Wales is the protection given to a person during criminal proceedings from adverse consequences of remaining silent. It is sometimes referred to as the privilege against self-incrimination. It is used on any occasion when it is considered the person being spoken to is under suspicion of having committed one or more criminal offences and consequently thus potentially being subject to criminal proceedings.

In most cases, these suspects should be given a caution with the following wording (or the Welsh version) as specified in PACE Code C:

You do not have to say anything. But it may harm your defence if you do not mention when questioned something which you later rely on in court. Anything you do say may be given in evidence.

== History ==
In England and Wales, the right of suspects to refuse to answer questions during their actual trial (the "right to silence", or the right to remain silent as it is now known) was well established at common law from the 17th century. The defendant was considered "incompetent" to give evidence and attempts to force defendants to provide answers, such as the efforts of the Star Chamber, were judged unlawful. Being unable to speak at their own trial, the practice of defendants giving an unsworn statement was introduced and was recognised in law in 1883. Defendants testifying in their own defence was also introduced in the 1880s (and extended to all offences by 1898) although the right to silence was clearly protected. As the right to testify was extended the possibility of unsworn statements was withdrawn.

However the right of suspects to refuse to answer questions before trial was not codified as Judges' Rules until 1912. Prior to 1912, while torture had been banned, the mistreatment of silent suspects to induce a confession was common and the refusal to answer questions was used as evidence against them. The intermingling of the investigative and judicial roles was not formally divided until 1848, when the interrogation of suspects was made solely a police matter, with the establishment of the modern police forces.

Defendants giving evidence in court became commonplace to such an extent that, by 1957, it was actually a shock when a defendant did not give evidence. When, during his trial for murder, Dr John Bodkin Adams decided, on the advice of his lawyer, not to give evidence, the prosecution, the gallery and even the judge, Baron Devlin, were surprised. In the view of Melford Stevenson, junior counsel in the prosecution (and later a prominent judge), speaking in the early 1980s: "It should be possible for the prosecution to directly examine an accused ... It was a clear example of the privilege of silence having enabled a guilty man to escape."

The Judges' Rules, with the inclusion of a caution on arrest of the right to silence, were not taken in by the government until 1978. However the rights were already well established by case law as was the necessity of no adverse comments, the principle being that the defendant does not have to prove his innocence – the burden of proof rests on the prosecution.

However the right to remain silent "does not denote any single right, but rather refers to a disparate group of immunities, which differ in nature, origin, incidence and importance". Lord Mustill identified six rights contained within the umbrella term:

1. A general immunity, possessed by all persons and bodies, from being compelled on pain of punishment to answer questions posed by other persons or bodies.
2. A general immunity ... from being compelled on pain of punishment to answer questions the answers to which may incriminate them.
3. A specific immunity, possessed by all persons under suspicion of criminal responsibility whilst being interviewed by police officers or others in similar positions of authority, from being compelled on pain of punishment to answer questions of any kind.
4. A specific immunity, possessed by accused persons undergoing trial, from being compelled to give evidence, and from being compelled to answer questions put to them in the dock.
5. A specific immunity, possessed by persons who have been charged with a criminal offence, from having questions material to the offence addressed to them by police officers or persons in a similar position of authority.
6. A specific immunity ... possessed by accused persons undergoing trial, from having adverse comment made on any failure (a) to answer questions before the trial, or (b) to give evidence at the trial.

=== Modifications and uniform wording ===
There were a number of projects to modify the law, such as the 1972 Criminal Law Revision Committee. The committee recommended that inferences should be drawn from silence, but the committee report was strongly opposed. Certain changes were introduced with the Police and Criminal Evidence Act 1984 (commonly known as PACE), deriving from the Royal Commission on Criminal Procedure report of 1981; these introduced a right to have a legal representative during police interrogation and improved access to legal advice.

The right to silence during questioning and trial was changed substantially in the 1990s. The right had already been reduced for those accused of terrorist offences, or questioned by the Serious Fraud Office or the Royal Ulster Constabulary, but in 1994 the Criminal Justice and Public Order Act modified the right to silence for any person under police questioning in England and Wales. Before the Act, the caution issued by the police varied from force to force, but was along the lines of:

You do not have to say anything unless you wish to do so, but anything you do say will be taken down and may be given in evidence.

This is similar to the right to silence clause in the Miranda warning in the US. PACE Code C, one of the codes of practice issued under PACE, was modified to specify a uniform wording for the caution, namely:

You do not have to say anything. But it may harm your defence if you do not mention when questioned something which you later rely on in court. Anything you do say may be given in evidence.

In some circumstances, particularly if a suspect has requested legal advice but has not been allowed the opportunity to consult a solicitor, no adverse inferences may be drawn. In this scenario, the appropriate caution is amended to omit this possibility:

You do not have to say anything, but anything you do say may be given in evidence.

Equivalent cautions are specified in Welsh.

The 1994 Act, in addition to the amended codes of practice, was based on the 1972 Criminal Law Revision Committee report and the Criminal Evidence (Northern Ireland) Order 1988. It rejected the reports of the 1991 Royal Commission on Criminal Justice and the Working Group on the right to silence. The supporters of the proposed Act argued that the existing law was being exploited by "professional" criminals, while innocent people would rarely exercise their right. Changing the law would improve police investigations and adequate safeguards existed to prevent police abuse. Opponents claimed that innocent people may reasonably remain silent for many reasons, and that changing the law would introduce an element of compulsion and was in clear conflict with the existing core concepts of the presumption of innocence and the burden of proof.

== Right to remain silent ==
A defendant in a criminal trial has no obligation to answer any questions, but may choose whether or not to give evidence in the proceedings. Furthermore, there is no obligation to assist the police with their investigation.

Although certain financial and regulatory investigatory bodies have the power to require a person to answer questions and a penalty if a person refuses, if a person gives evidence in such proceedings, the prosecution cannot use such evidence in a criminal trial.

== Adverse inferences from silence ==
At common law, adverse inferences could be drawn from silence only in limited circumstances in which an accusation of guilt was made. It was necessary that the accused be on even terms with the person making a charge and that it was reasonable to expect the accused to answer immediately the charge put to him (although it was not clear if the rule applied where the accusation was made by or in the presence of police officers).

The Criminal Justice and Public Order Act 1994 provides statutory rules under which adverse inferences may be drawn from silence.

Adverse inferences may be drawn in certain circumstances where before or on being charged, the accused:

- fails to mention any fact which he later relies upon and which in the circumstances at the time the accused could reasonably be expected to mention;
- fails to give evidence at trial or answer any question;
- fails to account on arrest for objects, substances or marks on his person, clothing or footwear, in his possession, or in the place where he is arrested; or
- fails to account on arrest for his presence at a place.

Where inferences may be drawn from silence, the court must direct the jury as to the limits to the inferences which may properly be drawn from silence. There may be no conviction based wholly on silence. Further it is questionable whether a conviction based mainly on silence would be compatible with the European Convention on Human Rights. If there has been a breach of the PACE Codes of Practice, the evidence is more likely to be excluded under s. 78 of the Police and Criminal Evidence Act 1984. The Code envisages, amongst other things, recorded police interviews taking place at a police station, where the accused has access to legal advice and after the caution in the following terms has been given:

You do not have to say anything, but it may harm your defence if you do not mention when questioned something which you later rely on in court. Anything you do say may be given in evidence.

=== Facts later relied upon ===
Adverse inferences may be drawn in certain circumstances where before or on being charged, the accused fails to mention a specific fact that he later relies upon and which in the circumstances at the time the accused could reasonably be expected to mention. If this failure occurs at an authorised place of detention (e.g. a police station), no inferences can be drawn from any failure occurring before the accused is allowed an opportunity to consult a legal advisor. Section 34 of the 1994 act reverses the common law position that such failures could not be used as evidence of guilt.

A person relies on a fact if he relies upon it in his own testimony or his counsel puts forward a positive case.

What it is reasonable for an accused to mention depends on all of the circumstances, including the accused's "age, experience, mental capacity, state of health, sobriety, tiredness, knowledge, personality and legal advice". If a defendant states that he remained silent on legal advice, the question for the jury is whether silence can only be attributed to the accused having no satisfactory answer to the charge against him.

The section is primarily directed at circumstances where a defendant refuses to reveal his defence until trial, ambushing the prosecution.

=== Direction to the jury ===
In appropriate cases, the judge should direct the jury as to the proper limits of the inference of silence. The Judicial Studies Board have provided a specimen direction, which has been accepted by the European Court of Human Rights. The specimen direction is now included in the Crown Court Compendium. Failure to give a valid direction, does not, however, render a conviction automatically unsafe.

== European Convention on Human Rights ==
The concept of a right to silence is not specifically mentioned in the European Convention on Human Rights but the European Court of Human Rights has held that:

the right to remain silent under police questioning and the privilege against self-incrimination are generally recognised international standards which lie at the heart of the notion of a fair procedure under Article 6.

In the 2007 case of O'Halloran and Francis v. United Kingdom, the European Court of Human Rights held that the right to silence did not extend to motorists who refused to provide information about who was driving a speeding car when asked by the police.

== Exceptions ==
- The Regulation of Investigatory Powers Act 2000 s.49 and s.53 make it a criminal offence (with a penalty of two years in prison, or five years with regards to child sex offences) to fail to disclose when requested the key to any encrypted information.
- When a vehicle is alleged to have been involved in an offence, section 172 of the Road Traffic Act 1988, as amended by section 21 of the Road Traffic Act 1991 enables the police to require the vehicle's registered keeper, or any other relevant person, to provide information as to the identity of the vehicle's driver. A special warning is given indicating that refusal to do so constitutes an offence in itself.
- Under the Police Reform Act 2002 a person failing to provide a constable in uniform or designated person their name and address where they are suspected of having behaved or behaving in an anti-social manner is a criminal offence.

== See also ==
- Mute of malice, a defendant in a criminal case who willfully chooses not to speak
- Fifth Amendment to the United States Constitution
