= Urbanormativity =

Urbanormativity is the general view of urban areas as normal and real, and rural areas as abnormal, unreal, or deviant. The term is used in sociology, anthropology, cultural studies, and education to refer to the cultural dominance of urban institutions in complex societies.

In critical rural theory, scholars assume that cities rely on the resources, such as food, fuel, and raw materials, of rural communities in order to exist. The reliance of urban populations on rural resources is referred to as urban dependency. As terms of exchange between urban settlements and rural communities tend to become unequal over time, urbanormativity develops over time as the culture of cities takes on a cultural power that outweighs that of the countryside. This culture serves to justify the continued exploitation of the rural through the promotion of urbanormative stereotypes that deprioritize, sentimentalize, or ignore rural places and people.

In critical rural theory, "urban" refers to the cultural and economic dominance of metropolitan areas as a whole, and not specifically to cities. In this view, suburbs are considered to be politically distinct quarters of metropolitan areas that allow for resources to be retained within the suburb or for the exclusion of residents of other municipalities (such as school segregation) within a metropolitan area. In contrast, residents of rural communities frequently suffer disadvantages in access to healthcare, legal services, and police protection.
