= Operation Hera =

Maritime operation managing influx of African migrant into Europe

Operation HERA
- Part of FRONTEX
- Location: Spain (Canary Islands), Senegal, Mauritania, Cape Verde, Western Sahara
- Objective: Combating irregular migration
- Date: 19 July 2006 – Ongoing
- Executed by: Spain, Senegal, Mauritania, Norway and EU member states

Operation HERA is a joint maritime operation by the European Union established to manage migration flows and stop irregular migrants along the Western African Route, from the western shores of Africa to the Canary Islands, Spain. The operation was implemented following an increase in migrants arriving at the Canary Islands in 2006. It remains an annual operation managed by Spain and the European Border and Coast Guard Agency (FRONTEX).

== Background ==
Operation HERA was initiated after a sharp increase of migrants arriving at the Canary Islands in 2006. Spain and Mauritania maintained an ongoing bilateral agreement due to pre-existing use of the 'Western African Route'. In 2006, the Spanish government also requested assistance from the European Union and the then newly established European Border and Coast Guard Agency, FRONTEX. The Spanish government used article 8 of the European Council Regulation 2007/2004, which concludes that a member state can request support when faced with an issue regarding the external borders of the EU.

The EU responded by introducing operation HERA with the dual aim of identifying migrants arriving at the Canary Islands and conducting joint sea patrols along the western coast of northern Africa to stop vessels from leaving the shore. The patrols have been both aerial and maritime and have been conducted within and outside the territorial waters of Mauritania, Senegal, Morocco, and Cape Verde. Since its implementation, additional bilateral agreements between the governments of Spain, Mauritania and Senegal have been introduced. The results from the bilateral agreements have been used as tools by FRONTEX in operation HERA.

The operation is considered a success by FRONTEX. By 2007, thousands of migrants had been identified, and the number of migrants using the Western African Route had declined. In 2020, the number of illegal border-crossings along the Western African route again increased rapidly, see table below.

The operation can be divided into four distinct modules or periods. They are HERA I, HERA II, HERA III, and the following annual implementations of the operation. These are outlined in more detail below. The last official report on the mission was published in 2019 and is about Joint Operation (JO) HERA 2018.

== HERA I ==
The first module of operation HERA, called HERA I, was requested by Spain on 24 May 2006. The Government of the Canary Islands then claimed that a total of 31,863 irregular migrants arrived at the islands and requested support from the EU and FRONTEX. The operation began on 19 July 2006 and lasted until 31 October 2006, 105 days. It overlapped with the following module, HERA II, by several months. By implementing HERA I, the EU sought to increase border security and protect Spain from irregular migrants.

HERA I employed experts from various EU member states and Norway to identify and interview migrants arriving via maritime routes. According to FRONTEX, a total of 18,987 irregular migrants landed in the Canary Islands during HERA I and until 10 December 2006. FRONTEX further claims to have identified all migrants' countries of origin. The interviews were also seen as helpful in the identification of people involved in the business of migrant smuggling. Scholars have questioned the authenticity that all migrants could be identified and argue that not every migrant had been.

The experts participating in HERA I came from Germany, France, Italy, the Netherlands, Norway, Portugal, and the United Kingdom and were deployed in three different areas of the Canary Islands. HERA I did not use any physical assets, such as vessels or helicopters, but relied on experts conducting interviews with migrants. The total budget was 370,000 Euros.

According to FRONTEX, before HERA I had ended, they were able to see a decrease in migrants arriving at the Canary Islands. Between June and October, 6,076 irregular migrants were returned to their countries of origin. Most migrants came from Morocco, Senegal, Mali, Gambia, and Guinea.

HERA I differed from the following modules in that it solely focused on experts interviewing and identifying irregular migrants. HERA II, and the other modules, also implemented joint operations at sea to stop vessels carrying migrants from leaving African shores.

== HERA II ==
On 28 June 2006, before the primary implementation of HERA I, Spain requested further assistance from the European Union and FRONTEX regarding irregular migration in the Canary Islands. The second module, HERA II, started on 11 August 2006 and lasted until 15 December 2006, 127 days.

The activities conducted during HERA II focused on intercepting and diverting vessels carrying migrants that tried to reach the Canary Islands. Through joint sea patrols, using both vessels and aerial transport, the aim was to enhance operational cooperation and manage the border. Participating member states patrolled the maritime borders of Senegal, Mauritania, Cape Verde, and the Canary Islands. According to FRONTEX, the operation also had a humanitarian aim to reduce deaths and save more people attempting to cross the ocean.

HERA II further utilised bilateral agreements Spain had made with Senegal and Mauritania. Both countries agreed to accept the returns of those diverted, even if these individuals were not of Senegalese or Mauritian nationality. If vessels were discovered 24 miles or further from the African shore, they would be escorted to the Canary Islands.

Preventing a vessel from leaving Africa has been seen by scholars as a practice that presupposes individuals' legal status before having established whether they are asylum-seekers or not. There is more information regarding the issue under 'Critique'.

EU member states participating in HERA II were Austria, Spain, Finland, Italy, Latvia, Poland, and Portugal. It also included cooperation with authorities in Senegal and Mauritania. The module had 3 vessels, 1 helicopter and 2 aircraft as operational capabilities and a total budget of 3.2 million Euros.

According to a FRONTEX report, 20,192 irregular migrants were intercepted on their journey to Europe and 3,625 (about 18%) were diverted back to Senegal or Mauritania. The report does not contain information about where these individuals have been diverted.

== HERA III ==
A third request by Spanish authorities for assistance with migration flows resulted in HERA III. The module was implemented on 12 February 2007 and lasted two months, to 12 April 2007, a total of 60 days.

HERA III had two main activities, encompassing the previous modules, HERA I and II. First, experts were employed to conduct interviews and identify migrants arriving at the Canary Islands. Second, the module implemented joint maritime and aerial patrols along the coasts of Western Africa. The module's goal was similar to the previous two and aimed at intercepting and diverting irregular migrants trying to reach Europe. FRONTEX has further claimed that it also aimed to reduce the number of deaths at sea.

Six European member states and authorities from Senegal participated in HERA III. Experts from Germany, Italy, Luxembourg, and Portugal arrived to conduct interviews and identify migrants. Further, joint maritime operations were conducted by Spain, France, Italy, and Luxembourg together with Senegal. HERA III had the operational means of 3 vessels, 1 helicopter, and 3 aircraft. The total budget was 2.745 million euros.

HERA III intercepted 2,020 irregular migrants and diverted back 1,559 (roughly 77%) to African shores. About 585 migrants reached the Canary Islands. The majority of migrants came from Senegal, Gambia, and the Ivory Coast.

Sequels of HERA III were implemented throughout 2007 and saw the beginning of the annual JO HERA.

== JO HERA 2007, 2008, 2018 and the current situation ==
FRONTEX continues to publish reports annual reports on its operation in the Canary Islands. There are issues with accessing official reports and documents that show the available data of all years the operation has been active. As of 2021, operation HERA is still ongoing but not considered one of FRONTEX's main operations. Operation HERA was last mentioned in an official report from 2019, covering the joint operation 2018. As can be seen in FRONTEX's data on migration, it is clear that migrants still use the Western African Route.

=== JO HERA 2007 ===
HERA 2007 coordinated the EU member states participating in the operation to manage irregular migrants arriving at the Canary Islands. HERA 2007 was implemented in two stages. First, between 23 April 2007 and 15 June 2007. The second stage was implemented between 12 July 2007 and November 2007. The final date has not been confirmed.

The first stage of HERA 2007 employed 3 vessels, 4 fast patrol boats, 1 helicopter, and 1 aircraft as operational resources. The second employed 5 vessels, 4 fast patrol boats, 2 helicopters, and 3 aircraft. Both stages utilised experts for interviews and identification of migrants. The total budget of HERA 2007 was 3.5 million euros.

HERA 2007 managed to intercept 4,953 migrants, out of which 2,507 (roughly 50%) were diverted back to African shores.

=== JO HERA 2008 ===
HERA 2008 was implemented between February and December 2008. The main objective was to tackle the flows of migrants arriving at the Canary Islands from western Africa.

HERA 2008 diverted 5,969 migrants back to African shores.

=== JO HERA 2018 ===
JO HERA 2018 was implemented on 16 August 2018 and lasted until 15 November 2018. The area covered was the Canary Islands, its territorial waters, and the Exclusive Economic Zone and the corresponding airspace of Senegal. France was the only participating member state from the EU.

JO HERA 2018 maintained one local coordination centre in Las Palmas de Gran Canaria, where officers from Morocco, Mauritania, and Senegal also participated. An international coordination centre was headquartered in Madrid, from where JO HERA and JO Indalo 2018 were managed.

FRONTEX claims that no migrants were intercepted during JO HERA 2018. The operation engaged in several search & rescue missions, the apprehension and identification of irregular migrants landing on the Canary Islands, and the seizure of smuggled goods and drugs.

Approximately 1,500 migrants were registered on the Western African Route to the Canary Islands during 2018. But different FRONTEX sources claim different definitive numbers. Most migrants came from Morocco or Senegal.

=== The current situation, FRONTEX and JO HERA in 2021 ===
Since 2018, the regulation under which FRONTEX operates has changed, and their mandate has been expanded. In Spain, FRONTEX employs roughly 180 officers across several operations. Apart from JO HERA, operations Minerva (summer months) and Indalo (all year round) also concern maritime border control in Spain, specifically in the Mediterranean Sea.

As of January 2025, the last available updates on monthly detections of migrants using the Western African Route were from November 2024, when 7,718 illegal border-crossings were detected.

Number of detections of illegal border-crossings on the Western African Route (not the number of intercepted or diverted migrants)
Year	Number detected
2009	2244
2010	196
2011	326
2012	113
2013	264
2014	231
2015	690
2016	583
2017	399
2018	1279
2019	2007
2020	20655
2021	19959
2022	14994
2023	34983
2024 up to Nov	41916

For comparison, the Canary Islands population was estimated in 2021 to be 2,172,944, and the islands received approximately 14Million tourists in 2023.

== Criticism ==
Critical voices have been raised against FRONTEX and practices used during operation HERA. Major criticisms have often fallen under three related categories.

Practices of intercepting and diverting vessels carrying migrants have been criticised for violating human rights, specifically as the individuals on the vessels are deemed irregular migrants before their legal status as possible refugees have been established. Practices used during operation HERA have been implemented in other countries and have had differing results and consequences for the EU. In 2009, refugees from Libya were diverted by Italian authorities acting under a bilateral agreement similar to that of Spain and Senegal and Mauritania. Under the so-called 'Hirsi Judgement', the practice between Italy and Libya was established as violating human rights

There is also a lack of publicly available information and reports, resulting in a lack of transparency. As of May 2021, the last publicly available news release regarding operation HERA was published in 2009. The lack of transparency has also impacted the criticism regarding human rights violations, as complete statistics and information concerning the operation are lacking, making it difficult to scrutinise possible violations

The operation has been accused of engaging in a practice termed 'externalisation' of the European border, wherein the EU administers checks and controls over entry to the region outside its own territory. The externalisation has been criticised for increasing the risks of human rights violations and for the lack of transparency as it stops possible refugees and asylum-seekers from entering the EU, since it is challenging to scrutinise practices and documents in countries outside the EU

== Sources ==
FRONTEX, (2015). "Frontex' Annual Report on the implementation on the EU Regulation 656/2014 of the European Parliament and of the Council of 15 May 2014 establishing rules for the surveillance of the external sea borders", Warsaw, accessed 5 May 2021

FRONTEX, (2016), "Operations in Spain", accessed 5 May 2021

FRONTEX, (2018). "Programming Document 2019-2021", accessed 5 May 2021

FRONTEX, (n.d). "Key Documents: Single Programming Documents", accessed 5 May 2021

Gauci, Jean-Pierre and Mallia, Patricia, (2016). "The Migrant Smuggling Protocol and the Need for a Multi-faceted Approach: Inter-sectionality and Multi-actor Cooperation", in 'Boat Refugees' and Migrants at Sea: a Comprehensive Approach: Integrating Maritime Security with Human Rights, edited by Violeta Moreno-Lax and Efthymios Papastavridis, BRILL, 2016. ProQuest Ebook Central, accessed 5 May 2021

Rukyte, M., (2014). "The European Union Agency's FRONTEX mandate and operations in the framework of transparency and human rights", Master Thesis International and European Public Law: Tilburg University, accessed 6 May 2021
