= Saadet Yüksel =

Turkish judge at the European Court of Human Rights

Judge at the European Court for Human Rights
- Incumbent
- Assumed office July 2019
- Preceded by: Ayşe Işıl Karakaş

Personal details
- Born: Saadet Yüksel; 7 December 1983 (age 42) Istanbul, Turkey
- Education: Istanbul University (LLB, LLM, PhD); Harvard Law School (LLM)
- Occupation: Jurist; lawyer; lecturer
- Institutions: Istanbul University; Harvard Law School; Koç University; Hamad Bin Khalifa University

Saadet Yüksel (born 7 December 1983) is a Turkish judge at the European Court of Human Rights.

== Education ==
Yüksel entered the faculty of Law of the Istanbul University in September 2000, where she obtained a Bachelor of Laws in 2004 and a Master of European Laws in 2006. Yüksel is a member of the Istanbul Bar Association and worked in Turkey from 2005 onwards as a lawyer, including on human rights issues. In 2011, Yüksel obtained an additional Master of Laws from the Harvard Law School. She then returned to Turkey where she obtained a Ph.D at the Istanbul University in 2012.

== Professional career ==
Following she worked as a lecturer at Istanbul University, where she became associate professor of constitutional law in 2016. In 2017 she took over a chair for constitutional law. During her career she has been a visiting lecturer at Harvard, the Koç University and the Hamad Bin Khalifa University in Qatar.

In April 2019, Yüksel was elected judge at the European Court of Human Rights by the Parliamentary Assembly of the Council of Europe (PACE) after having been put forward as one of the three candidates by the Turkish Government, replacing Ayşe Işıl Karakaş. Her tenure as a judge of the ECtHR, which is expected to last until 2028 began in July 2019.

=== Controversies ===
She accompanied Róbert Ragnar Spanó on his trip to Turkey in September 2020. During his stay in Turkey, Spano received an honorary doctorate by the Istanbul University, which drew criticism by Turkish academics like Mehmet Altan and politicians of the Peoples' Democratic Party. Following Yüksel’s appointment, human rights observers expressed concern over her impartiality given the close relations between Turkey’s ruling Justice and Development Party (AKP) and the judge. Not only was her brother Cüneyt Yüksel a former AKP lawmaker and deputy chairman, but Yüksel herself was affiliated with conservative foundations supported by the Erdoğan government. She was also an assistant to and student of the late Prof. Dr. Burhan Kuzu, an advisor to President Erdoğan.

== Personal life ==
Her brother is Cüneyt Yüksel, a former member of parliament of the Justice and Development Party and a professor at the Istanbul University.
