= Gabriele Kucsko-Stadlmayer =

Austrian judge

Gabriele Kucso-Stadlmayer
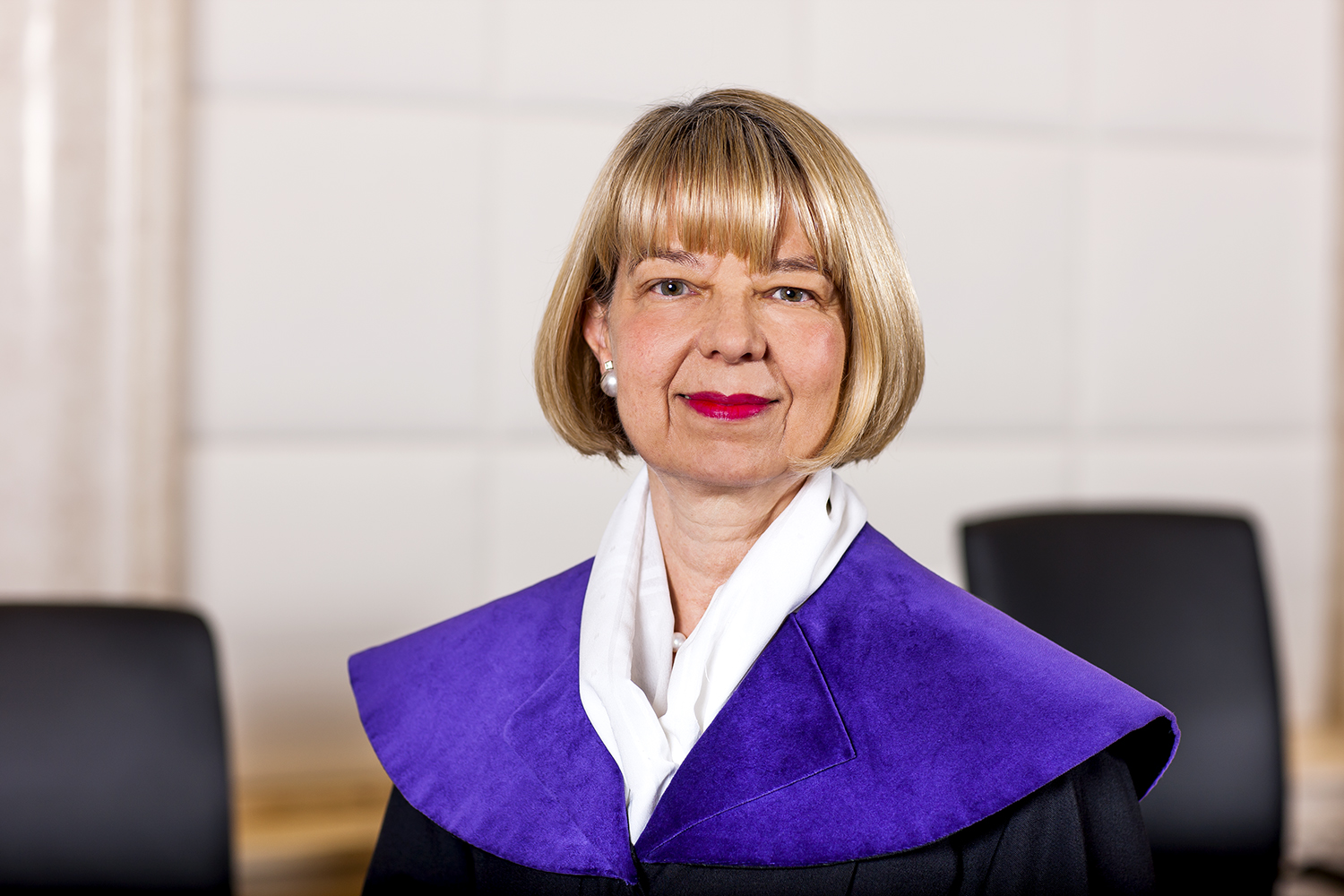

Judge of the European Court of Human Rights
- Assuming office 2015
- Succeeding: Elisabeth Steiner

Personal details
- Born: 19 December 1955 (age 70) Vienna, Austria
- Education: University of Vienna

Gabriele Kucsko-Stadlmayer (born 19 December 1955, Vienna) is a jurist and was judge of the European Court of Human Rights for Austria.

== Education ==
In 1973 she began to study law at the University of Vienna from which she graduated with a doctorate degree in 1977 and following became an assistant to the University. At the same university she obtained a postdoctoral degree in Constitutional Law in 1985.

== Academic career ==
Between 1993 and 2011 she was an associate professor for Constitutional and Administrative Law at the University of Vienna. And in the year 2000 she was a visiting professor at the University of Graz. During her career she was involved in several positions at the University of Vienna such as the head, the deputy head and the spokesperson of the Senate of the University. Between 2013 and 2015 she was also the spokesperson of the senates of the Universities of Austria.

== Offices ==
Between 2005 and 2009 she was a member of the election committee for the European Union Civil Service Tribunal. and from 2006 until 2013 she was the chair of the Arbitration Committee of the University of Vienna. In April 2015, she was elected as a judge of the European Court of Human Rights by the Parliamentary Assembly of the Council of Europe (PACE) and succeeded Elisabeth Steiner. She was elected a section President in the ECHR on 18 May 2022.

As judge of the ECHR, she seated in four cases in which the International Commission of Jurists was a third party. However, this poses the question of a conflict of interest as she is a member of the Austrian commission of Jurists, a national branch of the International Commission of Jurists, since 2000.
