= List of Romani rights cases before international courts and quasi-judicial bodies =

The lists contains cases of alleged violations of rights of Romani people brought before the European Court of Human Rights, European Committee of Social Rights, CJEU and United Nations human rights treaty bodies.

== Chronological lists ==
Month, year	ECHR case (application no.)	Year	Case (UN treaty body)
07.1986	F. v. UK (11862/85)	.	L. R. et al. v. Slovak Republic (CERD)
09.1996.	Buckley v. UK (20348/92)	.	Koptova v. Slovakia (CERD)
10.1998.	Assenov and Others v. Bulgaria (24760/94)	.	Lacko v. Slovakia (CERD)
05.2000.	Velikova v. Bulgaria (41488/98)	.	Dzemajl v. FR Yugoslavia (CAT)
01.2001.	Chapman v. UK (27238/95), Coster v. UK (24876/94), Lee v. UK (25289/94)	.	A.S. v. Hungary (CEDAW)
05.2001.	Cyprus v. Turkey (25781/94)	.	Durmic v. Serbia and Montenegro (CERD)
05.2002.	Conka v. Belgium	07.2010	Georgopoulos v. Greece (HRC)
06.2002.	Anguelova v. Bulgaria (38361/97)	07.2012	Katsaris v. Greece (HRC)
04.2003.	Kitov v. Bulgaria (37104/97)	.	.
03.2004.	G.B. v. Bulgaria (42346/98)	.	.
05.2004.	Connors v. UK (66746/01)	.	.
07.2004.	Balogh v Hungary (47940/99)	.	.
12.2004.	Bojilov v. Bulgaria (45114/98)	.	.
01.2005.	Kehayov v. Bulgaria (41035/98)	.	.
07.2005.	Moldovan and Others v. Romania (41138/98, 64320/01)	.	.
07.2005.	Nachova and Others v. Bulgaria (43577/98, 43579/98)	.	.
12.2005.	Bekos and Koutropoulos v. Greece (15250/02)	.	.
02.2006.	Ognyanova and Choban v. Bulgaria (46317/99)	.	.
02.2006.	Tzekov v. Bulgaria (45500/99)	.	.
02.2007.	Jasar v. Republic of Macedonia (69908/01)	.	.
04.2007.	Kalanyos and Others v. Romania (57884/00)	.	.
04.2007.	Gergely v. Romania (57885/00)	.	.
05.2007.	Šečić v. Croatia	.	.
07.2007.	Angelova and Iliev v. Bulgaria (55523/00)	.	.
07.2007.	Karagiannopoulos v. Greece (27850/03)	.	.
11.2007.	D.H. and Others v. the Czech Republic (57325/00)	Year	ECSR case (no.)
12.2007	Petropoulou-Tsakiris v. Greece (44803/04)	.	.
03.2008.	Stoica v. Romania (42722/02)	.	ERRC v Greece (15/2003)
04.2008.	Dzeladinov and Others v. Republic of Macedonia (13252/02)	.	ERRC v Italy (27/2004)
04.2008.	Sulejmanov v. Republic of Macedonia (69875/01)	.	ERRC v Bulgaria (31/2005)
05.2008.	Kirilov v. Bulgaria (15158/02)	.	ERRC v Bulgaria (46/2007)
05.2008.	Petrov v. Bulgaria (15197/02)	.	ERRC v Bulgaria (48/2008)
06.2008.	Sampanis and Others v. Greece (32526/05)	2009	INTERIGHTS v. Greece (ECSR 49/2008)
07.2008	.	07.2008	Kalamiotis v. Greece (UN HRC 1486/2006)
04.2009.	K.H. and Others v. Slovakia	.	ERRC v France (51/2008)
04.2009.	Tanase v. Romania (62954/00)	.	ERRC v Portugal (61/2010)
06.2009.	Beganović v. Croatia (46423/06)	.	COHRE v. Italy (58/2009)
12.2009.	Sejdić and Finci v. Bosnia and Herzegovina (27996/06, 34836/06)	.	COHRE v. France (63/2010)
12.2009.	Munoz Diaz v. Spain (49151/07)	.	.
01.2010.	Sashov v. Bulgaria (14383/03)	2012	ERTF v. France (64/2011)
03.2010.	Oršuš and Others v. Croatia (15766/03)	2012	FIDH v. Belgium (62/2010)
03.2010.	Paraskeva Todorova v. Bulgaria (37193/07)	2016	ERTF v. Czech Republic (104/2014)
4.2010	Stefanou v. Greece (2954/07)	2020	ERRC and MDAC v. Czech Republic (157/2017).
07.2010.	Carabulea v. Romania (45661/99)	.	.
12.2010.	Mižigárová v. Slovakia (74832/01)	.	.
11.2011.	V. C. v. Slovakia (18968/07)	.	.
02.2012.	Eremiášová and Pechová v. the Czech Republic (23944/04)	.	.
03.2012.	Aksu v. Turkey (4149/04)	.	.
04.2012.	Yordanova and Others v. Bulgaria (25446/06)	.	.
05.2012.	Kleyn and Aleksandrovich v. Russia (40657/04)	.	.
06.2012.	Koky and Others v. Slovakia (13624/03)	.	.
07.2012.	M. and Others v. Italy and Bulgaria (40020/03)	.	.
09.2012.	Fedorchenko and Lozenko v. Ukraine (387/03)	.	.
10.2012.	Molnar v. Romania (16637/06).	.	.
11.2012.	Lacatus and Others v. Romania (12694/04)	.	.
11.2012.	I.G. and Others v. Slovakia (15966/04)	.	.
12.2012.	Sampani and Others v. Greece (59608/09)	.	.
01.2013.	Horvath and Kiss v. Hungary (11146/11)	.	.
30.05.2013.	Lavida and Others v. Greece (7973/10)	.	.
09.07.2013.	Vona v. Hungary (35943/10)	Year	CJEU case (No.)
27.01.2015.	Ciorcan and others v. Romania (29414/09 & 44841/09)	07.2015.	CHEZ v Nikolova (C-83/14)
11.10.2016.	Bagdonavicius and Others v. Russia (19841/06)	.	.
17.11.2016.	V.M. and Others v. Belgium (60125/11)	.	.
17.01.2017.	Király and Dömötör v. Hungary (10851/13)	.	.
28.03.2017.	Škorjanec v. Croatia (25536/14)	.	.
31.10.2017.	M.F. v. Hungary (45855/12)	.	.
06.11.2018.	Burlya and Others v. Ukraine (3289/10)	.	.
16.04.2019.	Lingurar v. Romania (48474/14)	.	.
28.01.2020.	A.P. v. Slovakia (10465/17)	.	.
10.03.2020.	Hudorovič and Others v. Slovenia (24816/14 25140/14)	.	.
14.01.2021.	Terna v. Italy (21052/18)	.	.
21.01.2021.	Jusinova v. North Macedonia (59492/18 )	.	.
21.01.2021.	Redjepovi v. North Macedonia (30415/18 )	.	.
16.02.2021.	Budinova and Chaprazov v. Bulgaria (12567/13)	.	.
01.04.2021.	Pastrama v. Ukraine (54476/14)	.	.
24.06.2021.	Memedov v. North Macedonia (31016/17)	.	.

Ongoing ECHR cases: Mihaylova and Malinova v. Bulgaria (36613/08), V.T. v. Bulgaria (51776/08), Dimov v. Bulgaria (57123/08), Kirilov v. Bulgaria (50292/09). Ongoing ECSR case: European Roma and Travellers Forum (ERTF) v. the Czech Republic (104/2014).

== Lists by issues ==
=== Police, prison ill-treatment ===
- Assenov and Others v. Bulgaria
- Velikova v. Bulgaria
- Anguelova v. Bulgaria
- Ognyanova and Choban v. Bulgaria
- Sashov v. Bulgaria
- Eremiášová and Pechová v. the Czech Republic
- Bekos and Koutropoulos v. Greece
- Petropoulou-Tsakiris v. Greece
- Kalamiotis v. Greece
- Karagiannopoulos v. Greece
- Stefanou v. Greece
- Katsaris v. Greece
- Ciorcan and others v Romania
- Burlya and Others v. Ukraine
- M.F. v. Hungary
- Lingurar v. Romania
- A.P. v. Slovakia
- Jusinova v. North Macedonia
- Redjepovi v. North Macedonia
- Pastrama v. Ukraine
- Memedov v. North Macedonia

=== Lack of protection from racist violence and threats by private persons ===
- Škorjanec v. Croatia
- Király and Dömötör v. Hungary

=== Education ===
- D. H. and Others v. Czech Republic
- Sampanis and Others v. Greece
- Oršuš and Others v. Croatia
- Sampani and Others v. Greece
- Lavida and Others v. Greece
- ERRC and MDAC v. Czech Republic

=== Elections ===
- Sejdić and Finci v. Bosnia and Herzegovina

=== Housing ===
- Buckley v. UK
- Chapman v. UK
- Coster v. UK
- Lee v. UK
- Connors v. UK
- ERRC v. Greece
- Interights v. Greece
- ERRC v. Portugal
- ERRC v. France
- Bagdonavicius and Others v. Russia
- Yordanova and Others v. Bulgaria
- Georgopoulos v. Greece
- Hudorovič and Others v. Slovenia

=== Defamation ===
- F. v. UK
- Molnar v. Romania
- Budinova and Chaprazov v. Bulgaria

=== Sterilizations, family law ===
- K.H. and Others vs. Slovakia
- I.G. and Others v. Slovakia
- V.C. v. Slovakia
- N.B. v. Slovakia
- Z.K. v. Slovakia
- Terna v. Italy

=== Generalising court approach ===
- Paraskeva Todorova v. Bulgaria
