= Dragoljub Popović =

Serbian judge (born 1951)

Judge of the European Court of Human Rights in respect of Serbia
- Incumbent
- Assumed office 26 January 2005
- Preceded by: Attorney-at-law, university lecturer, novelist and a former diplomat. He lives between Lausanne and Belgrade.

Personal details
- Born: 25 July 1951 (age 74) Belgrade

Dragoljub Popović (born 25 July 1951) is a Serbian judge born in Belgrade and currently the Judge of the European Court of Human Rights in respect of Serbia.
