= Nur Farah Hirsi =

Minister of Ports and Marine Transport
- In office 6 February 2015 – 29 March 2017
- President: Hassan Sheikh Mohamud
- Prime Minister: Omar Abdirashid Ali Sharmarke
- Succeeded by: Maryan Aweys

Personal details
- Born: Somalia
- Party: Independent

Nur Farah Hirsi is a Somali politician. He is the former Minister of Ports and Marine Transport of Somalia, having been appointed to the position on 6 February 2015 by the now former Prime Minister Omar Abdirashid Ali Sharmarke.
