= School segregation =

Division of school students into characteristic groups

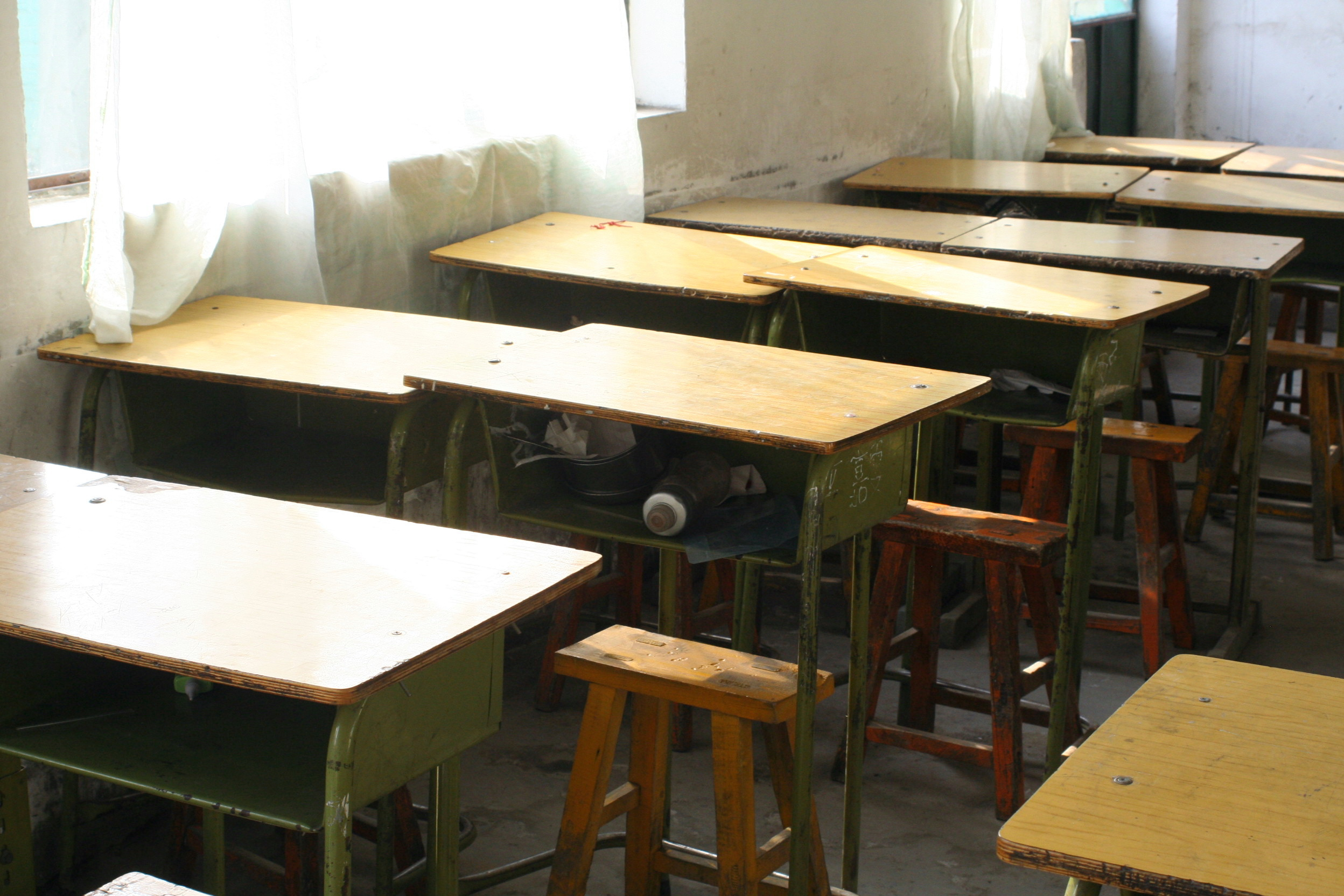
Classroom in a school for migrant students in Beijing, China

School segregation is the division of people into different groups in the education system by characteristics such as race, religion, or ethnicity. As race is a prominent factor in the United States, segregation is also linked with religious separation or ethnic exclusion of groups in other countries such as in Europe.

Before the mid-20th century, racial segregation in public schools was legally enforced in many parts of the United States, particularly in the South. Although the 1954 Supreme Court decision in Brown v. Board of Education ruled that mandated school segregation was unconstitutional, progress toward integration was not immediate. Black/African American students, especially in the South, would continue to attend predominantly Black schools for more than a decade after the ruling, while White students attended schools with a majority of white people. Supreme Court decisions like Green v. County School Board of New Kent County in 1968 started to mandate school desegregation and forced schools to implement measures to accelerate racial integration.

School segregation has also been associated with health disparities in the U.S., often among Black communities. These disparities are often correlated with unequal access to education and economic opportunities, since education could play a larger part in developing future health outcomes.

== Influence on Health Disparities ==
School segregation is one of the various indicators of racial health disparities that holds the strongest predictors of health inequality compared to residential segregation. This stems from different outcomes of school segregation in regards to health, such as homicides, premature deaths, diseases, mental illnesses, as well as infant mortality. The different variables that come into play when discussing the outcomes of school segregation are be due to the inequality in exposure to resources in education, resulting in students who would benefit from those resources to rely on other means.

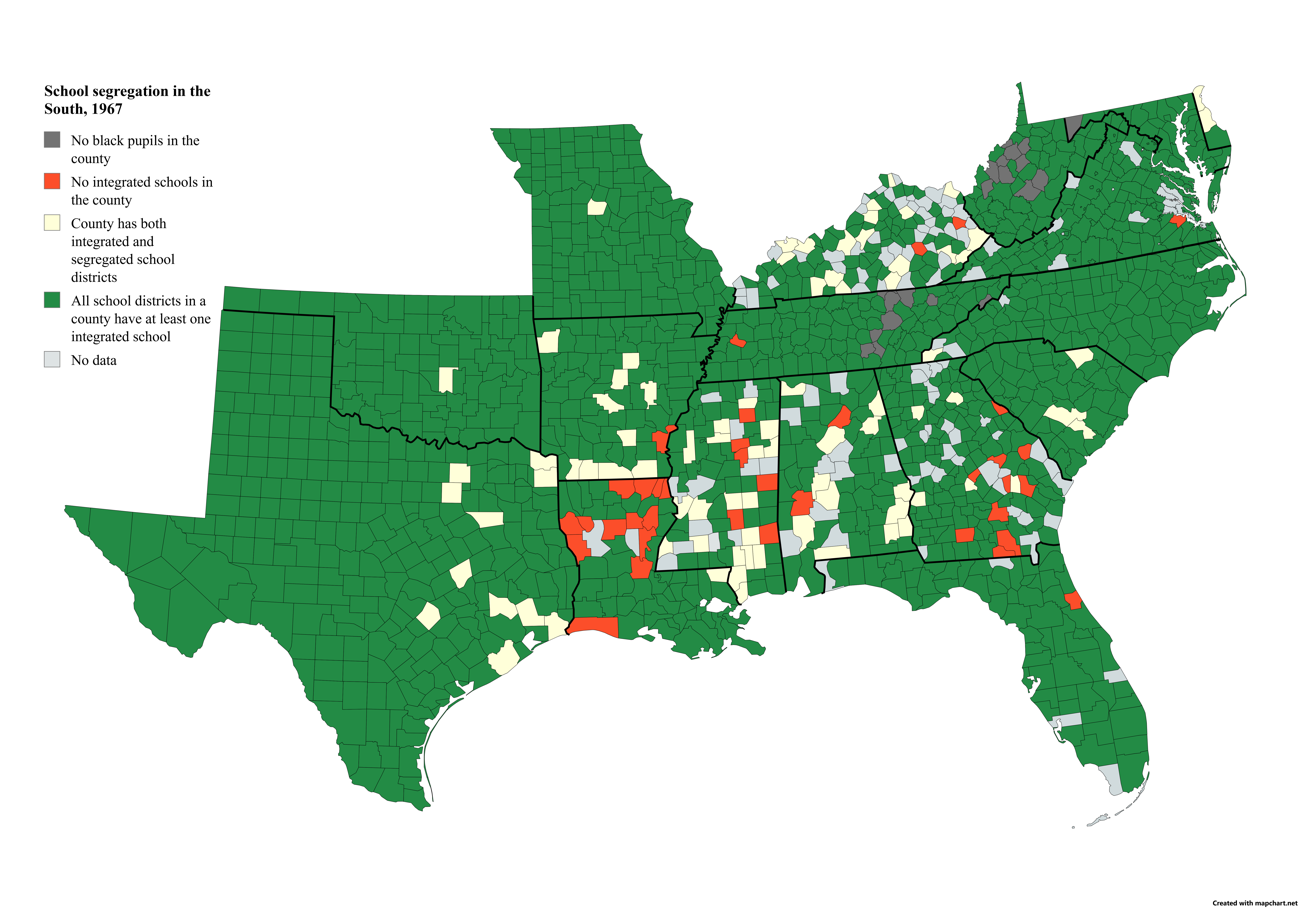
Distribution of Racial Integration Among Schools in the American South, 1967

In Michael Siegel and Vanessa Nicholson-Robinson's article concerning the association between residential and school segregation in racial health disparities, those with higher levels of school segregation are a driver for higher health gaps. Their study found that many countries have stepped away from school desegregation during the 1990s through legal rulings, causing long-term changes that are represented in the health data of those people who are later affected from it.

Research has shown that school segregation has measurable health consequences, where several structural factors, such as systemic financial discrimination, institutional racism, and contingent behaviors, interact to produce various health disparities among populations. These effects appear to occur from individualistic variables like peer prejudice or behavioral norms, but through structural inequality. Education has been linked with life expectancy, where barriers to education would, in turn, result in diminished health and lower life expectancies. Desegregation of schools elevates the education level in black children, which correlates with an association between school segregation and reduced life expectancies. Among the Black population, estimates suggest that completing high school is associated with nearly a decade difference in life expectancy, and that exposure to education in desegregated schools compared to segregated schools was linked to higher chances of graduation.

== See also ==
- D.H. and Others v. the Czech Republic
- Single-sex education
- Educational inequality in the United States

=== By country ===
- School segregation in Canada
- School segregation in the United States
