= Master of European Law =

Specialized Master of Laws degree

Master of European Law (LL.M. Eur) is a specialized Master of Laws (LL.M.) degree, awarded after successful completion of a course of study in the law of the European Union and preparation of subsequent master's thesis within this field.

LL.M. Eur programs are relatively narrow specialization of ordinary LL.M. programs. Usually, such a curriculum would start with general lectures in European Union law and history of European integration, followed with specialized courses, e.g. law governing the fundamental freedoms, competition law, Economic and Monetary Union, and European Procurement. LL.M. Eur programs are international in focus and LL.M. Eur students and graduates often work in an international and sometimes multicultural environment. EU institutions and some international law firms prefer graduates with this kind of diploma.

The oldest LL.M. Eur programme is provided by the Europa-Institut of Saarland University. LL.M. Eur study programmes are also offered by Utrecht University, College of Europe, University of Paris 1 Pantheon-Sorbonne, KU Leuven, Maastricht University, London School of Economics and King's College London.
