= Lawless v. Ireland =

1960 judgment of the European Court of Human Rights

Lawless v Ireland (1957–1961) was the first international court case decision that involved the interpretation of international human rights law and the first one filed against a country. It was referred to the European Court of Human Rights and the judgement by that court was its first.

The case was filed by Gerard Richard Lawless, who had been an IRA member, although he claimed to have left the IRA. He was arrested on 11 July 1957, as he was about to travel to Great Britain from Ireland, and subsequently detained under the special powers of indefinite detention without trial under the Offences against the State (Amendment) Act 1940. The case was filed by Lawless for violation, by the Irish Government, of Articles 5, 6 and 7 of the European Convention of Human Rights, providing rights to liberty and security, fair trial and the principle of "no punishment without law".

The Offences against the State (Amendment) Act 1940 was introduced by the Irish government as a response to a sabotage campaign initiated by the IRA in January 1939. Lawless was an IRA member and had been arrested in 1956 after guns and other weapons were found in County Leitrim; he was subsequently tried and acquitted, but later charged and convicted and sentenced to a month's imprisonment for possessing maps for attacks on British posts on the border between Ireland and Northern Ireland, and possessing documents advocating guerilla attacks on British officials and property; however he was acquitted by the same court on the charge of being a member of the IRA. Lawless was detained under emergency legislation on his third arrest.

The Irish government's case was presented by the Attorney General of Ireland, Aindrias Ó Caoimh, while Lawless was represented by Seán MacBride. The case was dismissed because emergency legislation was used. The verdict was handed down on 14 November 1960.
