= Hirsi Said Farah Gataa =

Hirsi Said Farah Gaataa Hirsi Said Farah Gataa Hirsi Said Farah (Hirsi Gataa)
- Somali
- Born: January 1, 1950; Bosaso Bari Somalia
- Died: 2017; Hargesia
- Spouse: ?
- Relatives: Russian and Italian officers
- Military career
- Allegiance: Somali armed forces
- Branch: SNA and Puntland police force
- Service years: 1969-2017
- Rank: Brigadier general
- Unit: SNA, Puntland police from 1998
- Commands: (1983-1986) Brigadier at SNA; (1998-2002) Puntland police force commander.; (2002-2006) Puntland custodian corps commander; (2016-2017).
- Hogaankii: Multiple wars .
- Awards: ? Medal of heroic
- Other work: senior adviser for troops affairs

Hirsi Said Farah aka (Hirsi Gaataa) was brigadier general at SNA and during post-conflict he became one of first commanders of puntland police force, later became commander of puntland regional custodian corps. he was born in the province of Bari In 1950. He died in Hargeisa In 2017 he was one of the officers in the long-worked, famous.

Hersi was one of the most senior Somali and hard-line officials In the course of their rule, he was the symbol of the rule of law, the protection of the rights of the soldiers and the courage and determination. History of 1947, Koranic and Primary School in the City of Bosasso . High School In Mogadishu, the capital of Somalia, in 1968,

When he graduated from high school, the Somali government sent a Russian military trainer, in 1969, to the Russian Military Academy in Odesa . After the training, Lieutenant Colonel Hirsi returned to the country from 1980 to 1982 a Somaliland regional headquarters in Somaliland .

From 1983 to 1986 at The General Commander of the Armed Forces of Somalia based in the demonstrations in the region. From 1987 to 1990 he was commander of the armed forces in the regions of Bay and Bakool . From 2000 to 2003, the Police Force Commander of Puntland Police . From 2005 to 2008 The Corps of Puntland .

From 08-10-2016 to 12-02-2017 was the Mayor of Waacei . Hersi was an obvious person and has been dealing with security issues for many years. He was a person who made strong decisions and facilitated the tasks assigned to him.
