= Giorgio Malinverni =

Swiss law professor

Giorgio Malinverni is a Swiss law professor at the University of Geneva. On 27 June 2006, he was elected by the Parliamentary Assembly of the Council of Europe as the judge in respect of Switzerland on the European Court of Human Rights. He holds a PhD from the Graduate Institute of International Studies in Geneva.
