= Yonko Grozev =

Judge at European Court of Human Rights

Yonko Grozev (born 27 December 1965, in Sofia, Bulgaria) is a former judge at the European Court of Human Rights with respect to Bulgaria from April 2015 until April 2024.

== Education ==
Grozev attended High School at the First English Language School (FELS, 114th High School) in Sofia. he obtained a Master of Law at the Sofia University “St. Kliment Ohridski” in 1991 and at the Harvard Law School in 1995.

== Career ==
Starting in 1993, Grozev focused as a lawyer in Human Rights litigation before the Bulgarian courts and the European Court of Human Rights. He pushed to implement the rights guaranteed by the European Convention on Human Rights. He progressively extended his field of activity to also work on cases linked with other countries. Before the Constitutional Court of Bulgaria, he also drafted amicus briefs.

He was a member of the National Council of the political party “Bulgaria of Citizens” from July 2012 to August 2014.

== Civil society work ==
Grozev has numerous links with NGOs for having founded and worked with a lot of them on diverse subjects around Human Rights issues. He was notably member of the board of the Open Society Justice Initiative (from 2011 to 2015) and of the Open Society Institute-Sofia (from 2001 to 2004), chair of the board and founding member of RiskMonitor (from 2009 to 2015). Since 2001, participated in the organization of training program for lawyers with the Helsinki Committee and Interights. He is also a founding member of the Bulgarian Helsinki Committee.
