= Elisabeth Steiner =

Austrian jurist

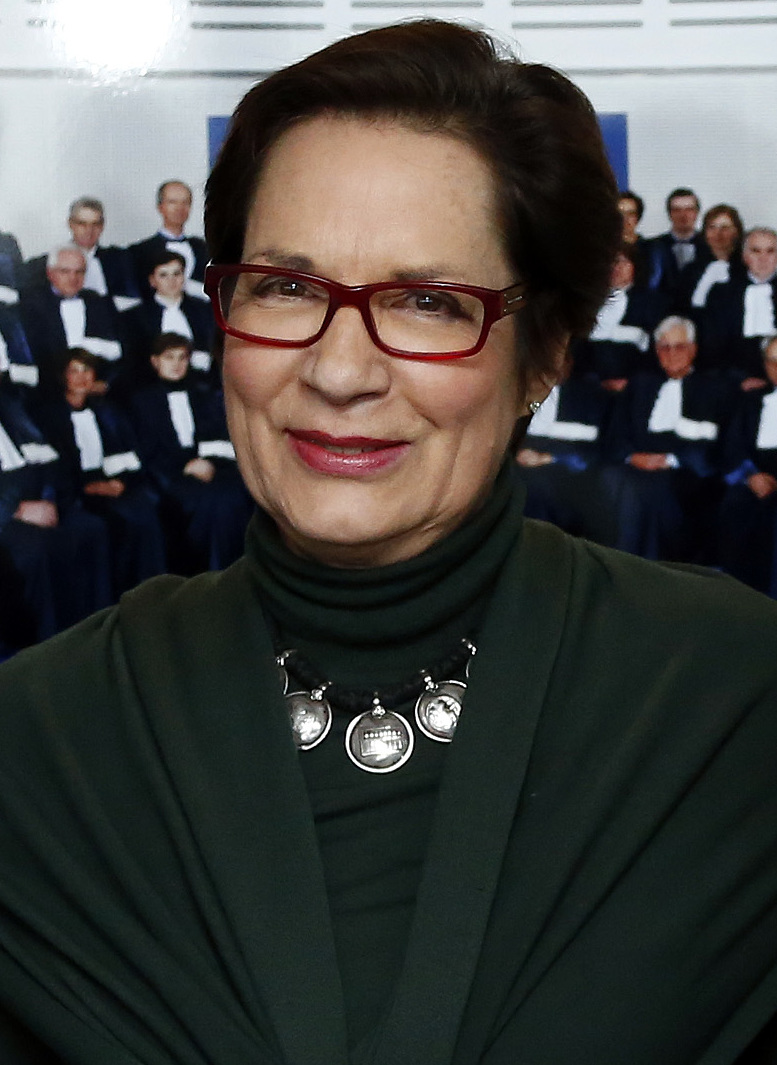
Elisabeth Steiner 2014

Elisabeth Steiner is an Austrian jurist a former Judge at the European Court of Human Rights in Strasbourg.

== Education ==
Born on 21 March 1956 in Vienna, Austria, she graduated from the Academy for Music and the Performing Arts in Vienna in June 1978, and went on to study law at the Faculty of Law, University of Vienna, where she obtained her Doctor of Law degree in 1981. She continued studying at the Economics University (Academy for International Trade) in Vienna for a master's degree (business administration), which she graduated in November 1983, and in January 1985 she received a Doctorate (business administration) from the same school.

== Call to Bar and working life ==
Steiner was admitted to Austrian Bar in December 1987 and established legal practice in Vienna in January 1988. She practiced solo until her appointment as a Judge. Between March 1999 and October 2001 she acted for some 80,000 former slave and forced laborers from Ukraine, Belarus and Russia, which involved extensive fact-finding missions to those countries. She achieved a remarkable success as she obtained reparation for tens of thousands of forced laborers during World War II. Between 1999 and January 2001 she represented Holocaust victims from various countries (USA, Austria, etc.). Judge Steiner places an emphasis on women's rights and maintains contacts with women's rights organizations in China, Nigeria, Bhutan, Nepal, Morocco, Sierra Leone, Algeria, Belarus and Ukraine. In 2001 she took up as a justice at the ECHR, a post she held until 2015 when she was succeeded by Gabriele Kuscso-Stadlmayer. Since 2015 she has been an Attorney at Law at Lansky, Ganzger + partner in Vienna.

In 2018, she was elected the chair of the Austrian section of the International Women's Forum for two years. In 2019, she was also elected into the international Court of Arbitration for Sport (CAS).
