= A v Home Secretary (No 2) =

UK constitutional law case

- Court: House of Lords
- Full case name: A (FC) and others (FC) (Appellants) v. Secretary of State for the Home Department (Respondent) (2004),
- Decided: Thursday 8 December 2005
- Citation: [2005] UKHL 71

Case history
- Prior action: [2004] EWCA Civ 1123

Court membership
- Judges sitting: Lord Bingham of Cornhill, Lord Nicholls of Birkenhead, Lord Hoffmann, Lord Hope of Craighead, Lord Rodger of Earlsferry, Lord Carswell, Lord Brown of Eaton-under-Heywood

Keywords
- Rule of law

A v Home Secretary (No 2) [2005] UKHL 71 is a UK constitutional law case, concerning the rule of law.

== Facts ==
Information obtained through torture of terrorist suspects by US armed forces and passed to UK officials had been presented to the Special Immigration Appeals Commission as part of the Crown's case to justify the indefinite detention in HMP Belmarsh of individuals suspected of offences related to terrorism.

Ten men were certified by the Secretary of State as suspected international terrorists and were detained in the Belmarsh prison in London. The certification was made on the basis of information obtained by torture (infliction of severe pain or suffering on a person in order to obtain information). The men appealed their certification and claimed that the tainted information should not have been admitted.

— Summary at the International Crimes Database

== Judgment ==
The House of Lords held that evidence obtained or likely obtained by torture committed abroad by a foreign state's agents is inadmissible in proceedings before the Special Immigration Appeals Commission. This freed the 10 men from prison if no further evidence could be provided. Lord Bingham said the following.

51. .... it would of course be within the power of a sovereign Parliament (in breach of international law) to confer power on [a tribunal] to receive third party torture evidence. But the English common law has regarded torture and its fruits with abhorrence for over 500 years, and the abhorrence is now shared by over 140 countries which have acceded to the Torture Convention.

— https://publications.parliament.uk/pa/ld200506/ldjudgmt/jd051208/aand.pdf

== See also ==
- United Kingdom constitutional law
