= George Nicolaou =

Cypriot judge

Judge of the European Court of Human Rights in respect of Cyprus
- Incumbent
- Assumed office 1 February 2008

Personal details
- Born: 16 September 1945 (age 81) Larnaca, Cyprus

George Nicolaou (born 16 September 1945) is a Cyprus judge born in Larnaca and currently the Judge of the European Court of Human Rights in respect of Cyprus
