= Päivi Hirvelä =

Päivi Maarit Hirvelä (born 10 December 1954) is a Finnish former judge on the European Court of Human Rights. Hirvelä is on leave from the Finnish state prosecutor's office.

Hirvelä worked as a general legal assistant in Sodankylä and Lahti, Finland 1981-82, referendary of the Kouvola Court of Appeal of 1984–1990 and after a district prosecutor in Lahti, until she was appointed Public Prosecutor in 1999. She has also worked in the European Court of Human Rights Secretariat as a lawyer and a rapporteur of the Parliamentary Ombudsman's Office. She began her post as a judge on the European Court of Human Rights on 1 January 2007 and served to 31 December 2015, including as Vice-President of a Section from 2013 to 2015. Since 2016, she has served as a Justice of the Supreme Court of Finland. Hirvelä was a substitute member of the European Commission for Democracy through Law (Venice Commission) in respect of Finland between 2018 and 2022. She is also an ad hoc judge of the European Court of Human Rights, a member of the Council of Europe Group of Experts on Action against Violence against Women and Domestic Violence (GREVIO), and a practicing lawyer. Hirvelä holds a Doctor of Laws degree from the University of Helsinki.
