= Nona Tsotsoria =

Georgian judge (born 1973)

Judge of the European Court of Human Rights in respect of Georgia
- In office 1 February 2008 – 8 January 2018

Personal details
- Born: 13 April 1973 (age 53) Batumi, Georgia

Nona Tsotsoria (born 13 April 1973) is a Georgian judge from Batumi, Georgia. She served as judge of the European Court of Human Rights in respect of Georgia between 2008 and 2018.
