= Ayşe Işıl Karakaş =

Turkish academic and judge (1958–2024)

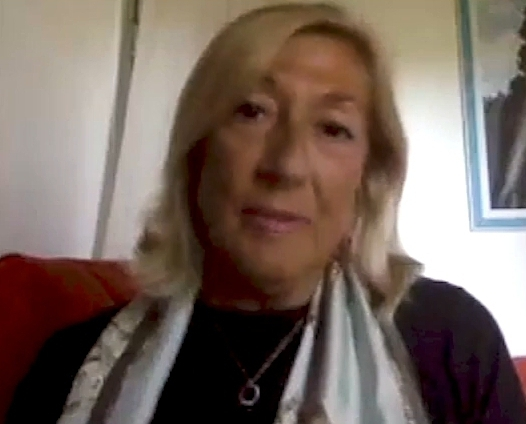
- In 2020
- Born: 8 December 1958; Istanbul, Turkey
- Died: 24 January 2024 (aged 65)
- Education: Galatasaray High School
- Alma mater: Istanbul University (BA, MA, PhD); Nancy II University (MA); Marmara University (LLB)
- Occupations: Academic; judge

Ayşe Işıl Karakaş (8 December 1958 – 24 January 2024) was a Turkish academic, professor of law, and former judge at the European Court of Human Rights in respect of the Republic of Turkey.

== Career ==
In 1983, she graduated from the Department of Political Science of Istanbul University, and between 1984 and 1993, she worked as a research assistant in the same institution. In 1986, she gained her first master's degree in Public Law, Istanbul University. In 1986, she gained her second master's degree in the field of European Law at the Centre Européen Universitaire at the Nancy II University.

In 1990, Karakaş graduated from the Faculty of Law of Marmara University, and was admitted to the Istanbul Bar Association in 1990. In 1992, she received her PhD degree in Public Law at Istanbul University.

Between 1993 and 1999, Karakaş was an associate professor at the Faculty of Political Sciences of Istanbul University. She also worked at the Faculty of Law at the Galatasaray University between 1999 and 2003.

Between 2002 and 2008, Karakaş was the Director of the Research and Documentation Centre on Europe at the Galatasaray University.

Between 2003 and 2008, she worked as a full professor of International Law at the Faculty of Law of the Galatasaray University. She was a visiting professor at the University of Aix-Marseille III, of Reims, of Montpellier II, of Université Robert Schuman, and vice dean of the Faculty of Law at the Galatasaray University between 2004 and 2008.

She was a judge of the European Court of Human Rights in respect of the Republic of Turkey since 1 May 2008. Her term ended in 2017, but due to difficulties in finding a successor, she remained in office on an interim basis until Saadet Yüksel was elected as her successor in 2019.

== Viewpoints ==
Karakaş was a supporter of allowing the hijab in Turkish universities. She took part in the conferences of the 'Abant Platformu' foundation, which has close ties to Fethullah Gülen. Politically she was known as a liberal. She belonged to the 'Second Republicans' (Group with liberal and marxist political views in Turkey), who support the AKP and its political goals like allowing for the hijab at universities.

== Personal life and death ==
Karakaş was born in Istanbul, Turkey on 8 December 1958. She died on 24 January 2024, at the age of 65.
