= Alvina Gyulumyan =

Armenian judge (born 1956)

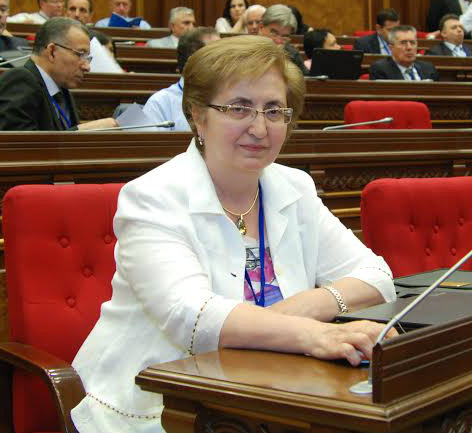

Judge at the Constitutional Court of Armenia
- Incumbent
- Assumed office 2014
- In office 1996–2003

Judge of the European Court of Human Rights in respect of Armenia
- In office 2 April 2003 – 1 November 2014

Personal details
- Born: 20 January 1956 (age 70) Shahumyan, Azerbaijan
- Education: Yerevan State University
- Profession: Lawyer

Alvina Gyulumyan (Armenian: Ալվինա Գյուլումյան, born 20 January 1956) is an Armenian judge born in the village of Shaumyan in Azerbaijan's Dashkesan region and currently Judge at the Constitutional Court of Armenia. From April 2003 to 1 November 2014 she was the Judge of European Court of Human Rights in respect of Armenia. According to the Decree of the President of Armenia on 23 April 1998, Alvina Gyulumyan was awarded The High Judicial Qualification of a Judge. Alvina Gyulumyan is married and has one daughter A.S.

== Early years and education ==
Alvina Gyulumyan was born on 20 January 1956 in Azerbaijan. In 1978 Alvina Gyulumyan graduated from the Law Faculty of Yerevan State University. In 1998 she was awarded The High Judicial Qualification of a Judge, granted by a Decree of the President of Armenia. In 1997 Alvina Gyulumyan got a Certificate from the Training Program at the International Law Institute, Georgetown University in Washington, D.C.

== Professional activities ==
=== Judicial activities ===
- 2003 – 2014 Judge at the European Court of Human Rights elected with respect to Armenia
- 1996–2003 Judge of the Constitutional Court of Armenia
- 1985–1996 Judge of the Supreme Court of Armenia
- 1978–1985 Lawyer, Member of the Armenian Association of Advocates
- 2012–2014 vice-president of the Third Section at the European Court of Human Rights.
- 2014 Judge of the Constitutional Court of Armenia.

=== Non-judicial legal activities ===
- 1998–2001 Member of the State Commission on Constitutional Amendments
- 1997–1999 Member of the State Commission on Judicial Reforms in Armenia

=== Non-legal professional activities ===
- 2001–2003 Lecturer on the human rights at the Yerevan State Linguistic University

== Other activities ==
- 1997–2003 President of the Association of Judges of the Republic of Armenia. Organization of the activities of the Association, participation in the development of the professional expertise and in the training of judges, promotion of guarantees for the protection of rights and freedoms of citizens, etc.
- 1998–2003 Member of the Armenian Association of International Law. Engagement in the research on the expedience of the Republic of Armenia's accession to international treaties, identification and elimination of contradictions between the national legislation and international treaties, elucidation of international legal institutions for human rights protection and procedures.
- 1996–2003 Member of the Constitutional Law Centre of the Republic of Armenia

Raising public awareness of the Constitution of Armenia and participation in professional fora.

== Activities and experience in the field of human rights ==
Participation with making presentations in more than 30 local and international conferences and seminars, in particular:

- July 2013 Yerevan International Conference "The European Legal Standards of Rule of Law and the Scope of Discretion of Powers in the Member-States of the Council of Europe"
- October 2012 Yerevan International Conference "Interaction between Constitutional Court and Other Institutions in Ensuring the Execution of the Constitutional Court Judgments"
- October 2010 Yerevan International Conference "Safeguarding and protection of human constitutional rights in the practice of constitutional justice, taking into account the legal positions of the European Court of Human Rights"*
- January 2007 Paris, Round Table "France – Armenia: common legal heritage"
- September 2005 Yerevan, 10th International Conference "The legal principles and political reality in the exercise of Constitutional control"
- October 2004 Yerevan, 9th International Conference "The principle of the supremacy of law in the practice of Constitutional justice"
- October 2003 Yerevan, International Conference "Basic criteria of the evaluation of the limitation of human rights in the practice of Constitutional justice"
- June 2002 Rome, International Seminar on the resolution of conflicts between the central state and entities with legislative power by the Constitutional Court
- April 2002 Sofia (Bulgaria), International Conference on the electoral law
- September 1998 Yalta (Ukraine), International Conference "Human Rights for Human Development"
- May 1998 Istanbul (Turkey), International Conference on the Interrelation between Constitutional and ordinary courts
- April 1998 Moscow (Russia), International Conference on the protection of human rights by Constitutional Courts
- December 1997 Mexico, IV Congress of National Institutions of Human Rights Protection
- 1997 Yerevan, International Conference on the protection of human rights by Constitutional Courts
1. Speeches in monthly radio-seminars on the national radio, addressed to the population of the Republic, on the human rights issues
2. Participation in the research conducted by the Armenian Association of International Law on the scientific comparative analysis of 45 international treaties on human rights and national legislation.

== Publications and other works ==
1. The Rule of Law principle in the case-law of the European Court of Human Rights (Yerevan, 2004), Yearly Almanac "Constitutional justice in the new millennium".
2. European Court of Human Rights, Collection of Judgments (Armenian translation), (Yerevan 2002 and Yerevan 2003), Scientific editor and the author of the preface.
3. "Protection of electoral rights in Armenia" (Sofia, 2002), Selected materials of the International Conference.
4. "Christian Values in the Armenian Law", (Yerevan, 2001), Collection of reports of the international conference.
5. "The implementation of the rules of International Law in the national legislation of the Republic of Armenia", (Minsk, 2000), Collection of reports of the international seminar.
6. Human Rights in the legislation of the Republic of Armenia and their application (social and economic rights), (Yerevan, 2000), Institute for Democracy and Human Rights – "IDHR".
7. "The legislative guarantees of human rights protection in Armenia", (Yerevan, 1998), Collection of materials on human rights.
8. "Judicial reform and human rights (the example of Armenia)", (Yerevan, 1997), Collection of reports of the international seminar.
9. "The guarantees of the independence of a constitutional review", (Yerevan 1996), in Armenian and English, Collection of reports of the international seminar.
