= Ljiljana Mijović =

Bosnian judge and professor (born 1964)

Judge at the European Court of Human Rights
- In office 2004–2011
- Nominated by: Government of Bosnia and Herzegovina
- Preceded by: Office established
- Succeeded by: Faris Vehabović

Personal details
- Born: 21 April 1964 (age 62) Banja Luka, Yugoslavia
- Education: University of Banja Luka

Ljiljana Mijović (born 21 April 1964) is a Bosnian judge and professor. She was the first judge at the European Court of Human Rights with respect to Bosnia and Herzegovina, an office she held between 2004 and 2011.

== Early life ==
Mijović was born on 21 April 1964 in Banja Luka, Yugoslavia. She graduated in law from the University of Banja Luka in 1988, where she obtained a postgraduate degree in public and private international law in 1997 and a doctorate in law in 2002 with the thesis Tendencies of the International Legal Personality Development. She has taken courses on law and human rights in Sweden, Belgium and the United States.

She began working in 1989 as a professional assistant in a trade union and in 1991 she began as an assistant professor in the international law department of the University of Banja Luka and in 2002 she became a professor.

== Career ==
Between 1997 and 2001, Mijović was also a lecturer at the Police Academy in Banja Luka and has been a lecturer at the European Regional Human Rights Master Studies in Sarajevo and Human Rights Master Studies at the University of Montenegro.

Mijović has subsequently worked in human rights organisations in Bosnia and NGOs such as the Red Cross, Open Society and United Women and directed the Human Rights Centre of the University of Banja Luka.

In 2002 she was appointed member of the High Judicial and Prosecutorial Council of Bosnia.

Mijović was proposed in 2003 as one of the candidates to represent Bosnia and Herzegovina for the first time at the European Court of Human Rights. In January 2004, she was elected after winning the vote in the Parliamentary Assembly of the Council of Europe over the other two candidates and held the office until 2011.

== Personal life ==
She speaks Serbian, Bosnian Croatian, English and understands German.
