= Egbert Myjer =

Dutch judge

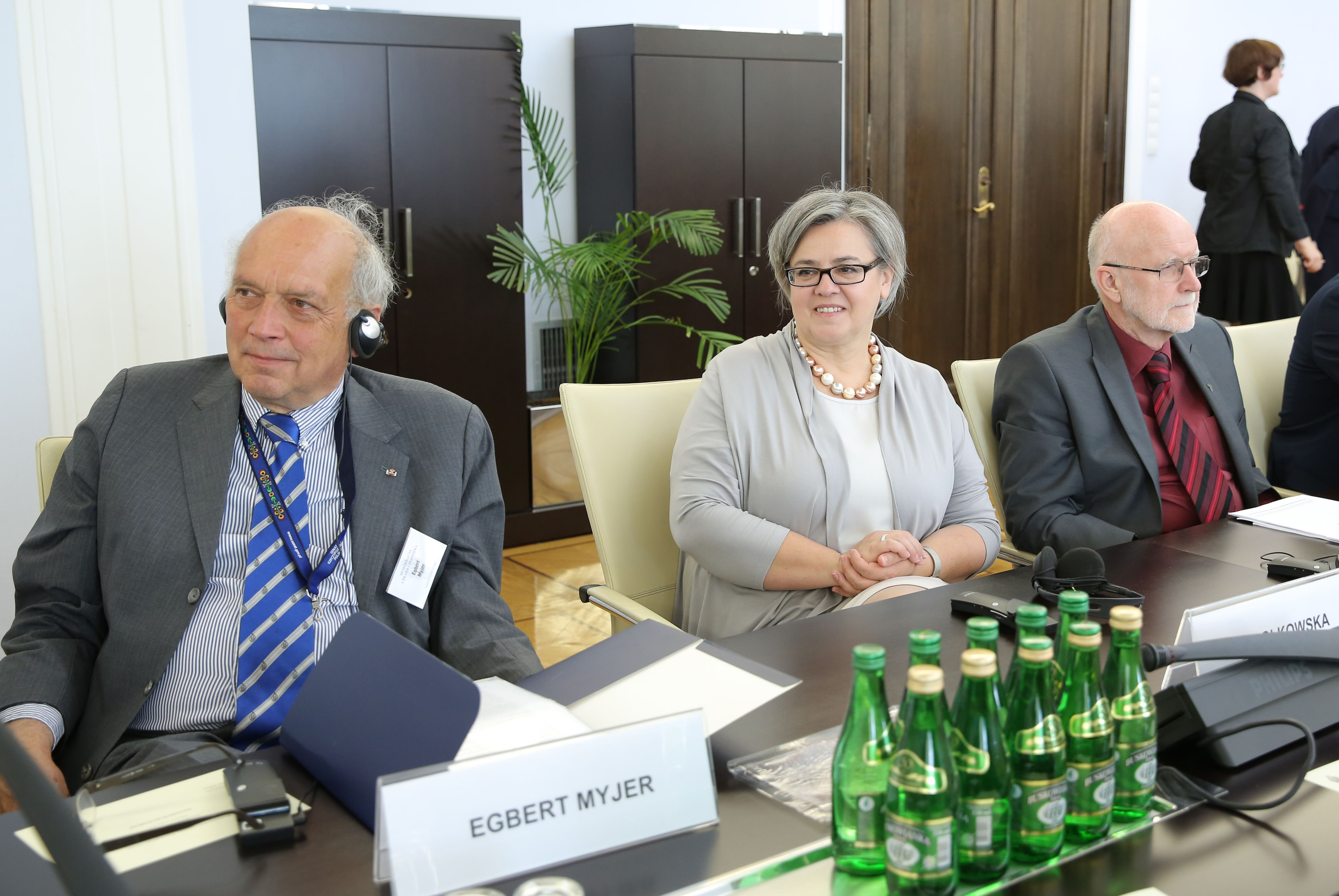
Egbert Myjer (left) at the conference in the Polish Senate (2015).

Egbert Myjer (born 31 July 1947) is a Dutch judge. He served on the European Court of Human Rights, elected in respect of the Netherlands, between 1 November 2004 and 31 October 2012. Since 1 March 2013 he is serving his first five-year term as a Commissioner of the International Commission of Jurists. He was appointed as a board member of the International Service for Human Rights in May 2013.

== Education ==
Egbert Myjer was born in Arnhem on 31 July 1947. He spent his childhood in The Hague where from 1959 till 1966 he attended the gymnasium of the Aloysiuscollege. From 1966 till 1972 he studied law at Utrecht University and specialized in criminal law.

== Career ==
From 1972 till 1979 he was an assistant in criminal law at Leiden University. In 1979 he was appointed vice-dean of the Netherlands National Training and Study Center for the Judiciary at Zutphen. In 1981 he was appointed a judge at the Zutphen District Court, from 1986 onwards as vice-president. In 1991 he made the change from the judiciary to the public prosecution service, and was appointed advocate-general at The Hague Court of Appeals. In 1996 he was appointed deputy procurator-general (later renamed as: chief advocate-general) at the Amsterdam Court of Appeals. In 2000 he was also appointed professor extraordinary in human rights at the Vrije Universiteit Amsterdam. Since 2012 he is professor emeritus.

Myjer is one of the founding editors of the NJCM-bulletin (The Netherlands Human Rights law Review) and remained an editor from 1976 until his election in the European Court in 2004. He wrote many articles and comments on the case-law of the former European Commission of Human Rights and the European Court of Human Rights. He was a member of the executive committee of the International Association of Prosecutors (IAP), and was an author, together with Nicholas Cowdery QC and Barry Hancock, of the IAP Human Rights Manual for Prosecutors (2003), which has been translated into French, Russian, Armenian, Turkish, Arabic, Spanish and Ukrainian. The second English edition appeared in 2009.

Together with Peter Kempees he is the author of a cautionary tale about the European Court of Human Rights: Jack and the Solemn Promise (2010, ISBN 978-90-5850-574-3).

Since December 2012 he has been a member of the Board of the Netherlands section of Amnesty International and the Foundation Universitair Asiel Fonds. He is also a member of the editorial board of the Netherlands Quarterly of Human Rights.

== Honors ==
Myjer was made Officer in the Order of Orange-Nassau in 2000 and Commander of the same order in 2012. He was awarded the Medal of Merit of the Council of Europe in 2001. In 2004 he was awarded with the Certificate of Merit of the International Association of Prosecutors. Since 2011 he is an Honorary Bencher of The Honourable Society of Lincoln's Inn.

== Personal life ==
Myjer is married and has two daughters and one son, comedian Jochem Myjer.
