= Josep Casadevall =

Andorran lawyer

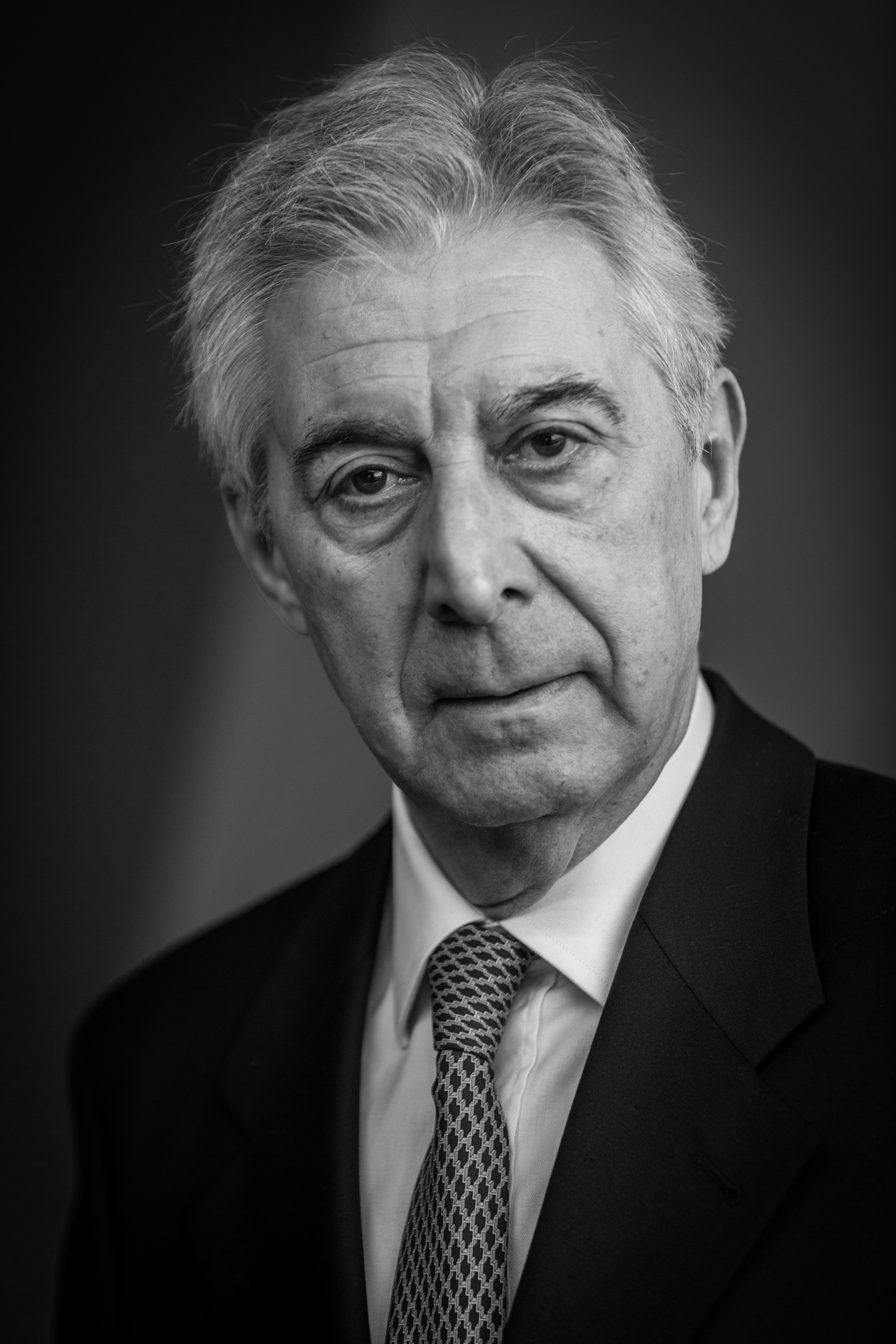
- Josep Casadevall (2015)

Judge of the European Court of Human Rights in respect of Andorra
- In office 1 November 1998 – 31 October 2015
- Preceded by: New appointment
- Succeeded by: Pere Pastor Vilanova

Personal details
- Born: 10 September 1946 (age 79) Girona
- Education: University of Madrid
- Profession: Lawyer

Josep Casadevall (born 10 September 1946) is an Andorran lawyer born in Spain and the judge of the European Court of Human Rights in respect of Andorra.

== Early life ==
Casadevall was born on 10 September 1946 in Girona, a city in the northeast of Catalonia, Spain. From 1970 to 1980, he was Secretary General of Andorra la Vella, the capital of Andorra, the largest and most populous of Europe's five microstates.

== Legal career ==
Casadevall graduated in law from the University of Madrid in 1978 and began practising in Andorra in 1980, becoming Secretary General of the Bar Association in 1984 and President in 1993. From 1985 to 1998, he was Professor of Law in the Spanish National Open University.

Casadevall has been the judge in respect of Andorra at the European Court of Human Rights, a non-permanent court enforcing the European Convention on Human Rights, since 1996. Prior to 1998, appointment as a judge of the Court was a part-time appointment, however in 1998 the Court was recreated as a permanent entity and appointment became full-time. Casadevall is resident in Strasbourg, the seat of the Court. He has been President of the Third Section of the Court since 1 February 2008.

== See also ==
- European Court of Human Rights
- List of judges of the European Court of Human Rights
