= Use of torture since 1948 =

This article describes the use of torture since the adoption of the 1948 Universal Declaration of Human Rights (UDHR), which prohibited it. Torture is prohibited by international law and is illegal in most countries. However, it is still used by many governments.

Torture is widely practiced worldwide: Amnesty International received reports of torture or cruel, inhuman or degrading treatment or punishment in more than 150 countries during the four-year period from 1997 to 2001. These accusations concerned acts against political prisoners in 70 countries and other prisoners and detainees in more than 130 countries. State torture has been extensively documented and studied, often as part of efforts at collective memory and reconciliation in societies that have experienced a change in government. Surveys of torture survivors reveal that torture "is not aimed primarily at the extraction of information ... Its real aim is to break down the victim's personality and identity." When applied indiscriminately, torture is used as a tool of repression and deterrence against dissent and community empowerment.

While many states use torture, few wish to be described as doing so, either to their own citizens or to international bodies. So a variety of strategies are used to circumvent their legal and humanitarian duties, including plausible deniability, secret police, "need to know", denial that certain activities constitute torture, appeal to various laws (national or international), use of a jurisdictional argument, claim of "overriding need", the use of torture by proxy, and so on. Almost all regimes and governments engaging in torture (and other crimes against humanity) consistently deny engaging in it, in spite of overwhelming hearsay and physical evidence from the citizens they tortured. Through both denial and avoidance of prosecution, most people ordering or carrying out acts of torture do not face legal consequences for their actions. UN Special Rapporteur for the Commission on Human Rights, Sir Nigel Rodley, believes that "impunity continues to be the principal cause of the perpetuation and encouragement of human rights violations and, in particular, torture."

While states, particularly their prisons, law enforcement, military and intelligence apparatus, are major perpetrators of torture, many non-state actors also engage in it. These include paramilitaries and guerrillas, criminal actors such as organized crime syndicates and kidnappers.

A recent approach to interrogations has been to use techniques such as waterboarding, sexual humiliation and sexual abuse, and dogs to intimidate or pressure prisoners in a manner claimed to be legal under national or international law. Electric shock techniques such as the use of stun belts and tasers have been considered appropriate provided that they are used to "control" prisoners or suspects, even non-violent ones, rather than to extract information. These techniques have been widely criticized as torture.

== Technology ==
Methods of torture are often quite crude, a number of new technologies of control have been used by torturers in recent years. The Brazilian government devised a number of new electrical and mechanical means of torture during the military dictatorship from 1964 to 1985, and proceeded to train military officials from other right-wing Latin American countries in their techniques.

== Inter-state collaboration ==
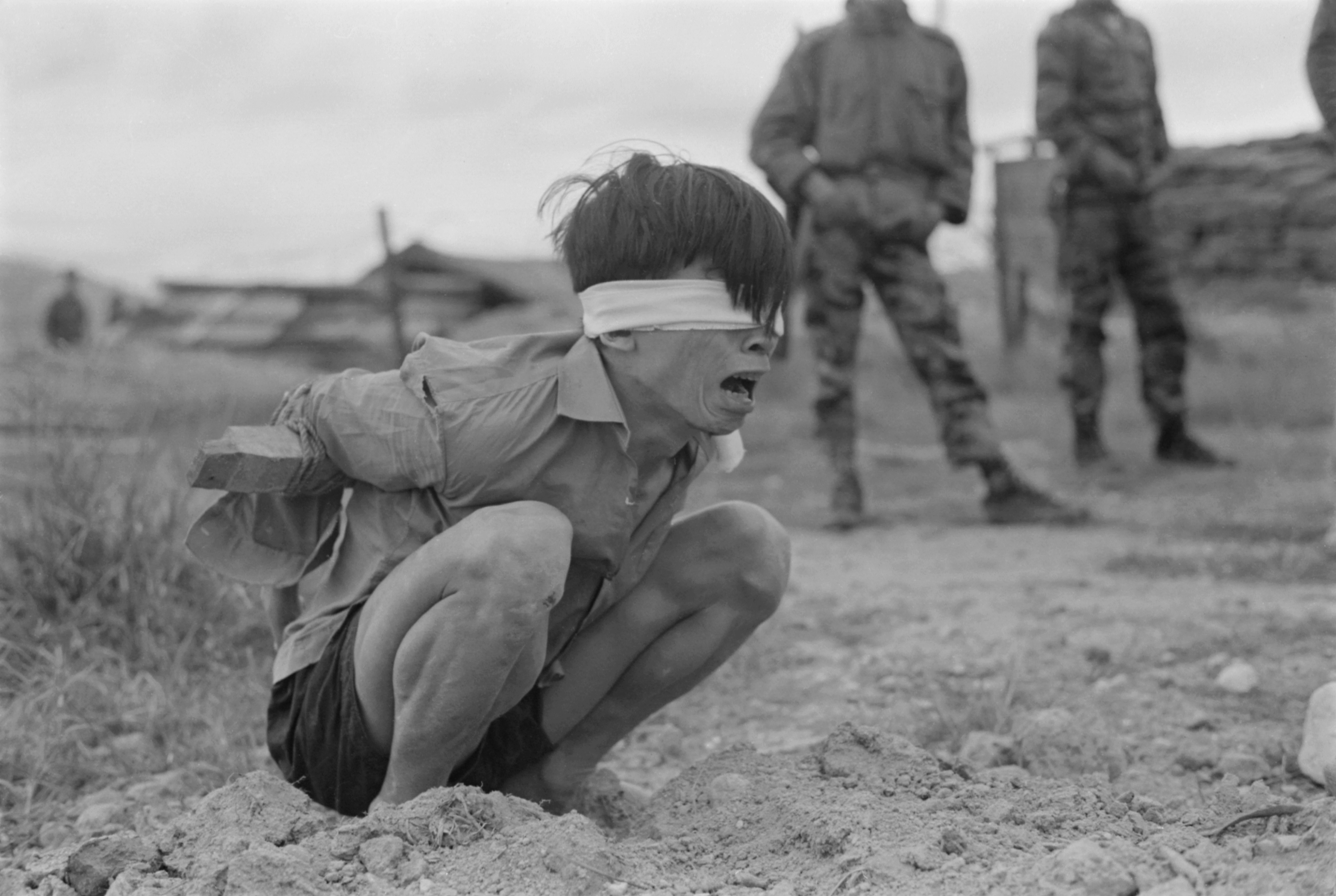
A Viet Cong prisoner captured in 1967 by the U.S. Army awaits interrogation. He has been placed in a stress position by tying a board between his arms.

Substantial cooperation between states in the methods and coordination of torture has been documented. Through the Phoenix Program, the United States helped South Vietnam co-ordinate a system of detention, torture and assassination of suspected members of the National Liberation Front, or Viet Cong. During the 1980s wars in Central America, the U.S. government provided manuals and training on interrogation that extended to the use of torture (see U.S. Army and CIA interrogation manuals). The manuals were also distributed by Special Forces Mobile Training teams to military personnel and intelligence schools in Colombia, Ecuador, El Salvador, Guatemala, and Peru. The manuals have a chapter devoted to "coercive techniques".

The southern cone governments of South America – Chile, Argentina, Uruguay, Bolivia, Paraguay and Brazil – involved in Operation Condor co-ordinated the disappearance, torture and execution of dissidents in the 1970s. Hundreds were killed in coordinated operations, and the bodies of those recovered were often mutilated and showed signs of torture. This system operated with the knowledge and support of the United States government through the State Department, Central Intelligence Agency and the Defense Department.

The United States government has, at least since the Bush administration, used the tactic of legal rendition in which suspected terrorists were extradited to countries where they were to be prosecuted for crimes allegedly committed. In the "war on terror" this has evolved into extraordinary rendition, the delivery of prisoners or others recently captured, including terrorism suspects, to foreign governments known to practice torture are South Africa, Egypt, Jordan, Morocco, and Afghanistan. Human rights activists have alleged that the practice amounts to kidnapping for the purpose of torture, or torture by proxy. A related practice is the operation of facilities for imprisonment, and it is widely believed torture, in foreign countries. In November 2005, the Washington Post reported — citing administration sources — that such facilities are operated by the CIA in Thailand (until 2004), Afghanistan, and several unnamed Eastern European countries. Human Rights Watch reports that planes associated with rendition have landed repeatedly in Poland and Romania.

== Recent instances of torture in selected countries ==
The U.S. and suspected CIA's "black sites" Extraordinary renditions allegedly have been carried out from these countries Detainees have allegedly been transported through these countries Detainees have allegedly arrived in these countries Sources: Amnesty International Human Rights Watch

The use of torture is geographically widespread. A review by Amnesty International, which did not use the United Nations Convention Against Torture as its definition of torture, of its case files found "reports of torture or ill-treatment by state officials in more than 150 countries from 1997 to 2000". These reports described widespread or persistent patterns of abuse in more than 70 countries and torture-related deaths in more than 80.

=== Afghanistan ===
Torture has been reported in Afghanistan under each of its recent governments. Under Najibullah's Soviet-backed regime, beating and electric shocks were widely reported. After the mujahidin victory, Afghanistan fell into a state of chaos, and, according to Amnesty International, "Torture of civilians in their homes has become endemic ... In almost every jail run by the armed political groups, torture is reported to be a part of the daily routine". The Taliban are likewise reported to have engaged in torture. Since the U.S. overthrow of the Taliban, torture has been reported on several occasions, both by Afghan groups and by U.S. troops. In the Herat region, dominated by the warlord Ismail Khan, Human Rights Watch reported extensive torture in 2002. Torture by US troops has been alleged in news reports by The New York Times. In March 2008 the UK Ministry of Defence claimed that they and the Afghan army had uncovered a Taliban torture chamber where two individuals were believed to have been beaten.

=== Albania ===
Under Enver Hoxha's People's Socialist Republic of Albania, torture was widely used by police and prison camp guards. Since the fall of communism, Amnesty International has reported police abuses amounting to torture; the government says it has "made efforts to punish all acts of torture under the Albanian criminal justice system". In 2020 more than 3000 Albanians signed a petition accusing the government of Edi Rama of torture against the Muslim cleric Genci Balla who was isolated under the article 41-bis prison regime in solitary confinement and deprived of halal food.

=== Algeria ===
According to Pierre Vidal-Naquet in "Torture; Cancer of Democracy" and "Les Damnees de la Terre" by Franz Fanon, torture was practiced endemically by the French forces, commanded by General Jacques Massu, bringing together the experience of "Les Paras" in the Indo-China War and German troops in the French Foreign Legion. One of the most notorious methods was the gegène, or generator, in which victims were tied down and electrocuted with a primitive device that delivered electric shocks to the genitalia.

=== Angola ===
In Angola's 27-year civil war, according to Amnesty International, "many were tortured" by both sides. Since that time, AI has also reported that "unarmed civilians are being extrajudicially executed and tortured" in Angola's war against Cabindan separatists.

=== Argentina ===
During the so-called "Dirty War" carried out in the 1970s, in particular, but not only, by the military dictatorship from 1976 to 1983, tens of thousands of Argentines were "disappeared" by the junta, many never to be seen again. The National Commission on the Disappearance of Persons concluded:

In nearly all the cases brought to the attention of the Commission, the victims speak of acts of torture. Torture was an important element in the methodology of repression. Secret torture centres were set up, among other reasons, to enable the carrying out of torture to be carried out undisturbed.

=== Bahrain ===
Torture has been used frequently by the Bahraini government in the 20th century. Notable cases include that of Ian Henderson, a former colonial officer employed in Bahrain who was accused by multiple witnesses of torturing prisoners. Adel Flaifel, a notorious security officer identified by many detainees as having overseen torture, was given immunity under Royal Decree 56 of 2002. Between 1980 and 1998, nine people died in detention as a result of torture, with five more dying shortly after being released as a result of injuries sustained from torture. Reports released by Amnesty International and Human Rights Watch in the 1990s point to the widespread use of torture in Bahraini prisons.

During the Bahraini uprising, torture was described by many human rights reports as widespread and systematic. Up to 1866 who make up 64% of detainees reported cases of torture. Three government agencies, namely the Ministry of Interior, the National Security Agency and the Bahrain Defence Force, were involved in interrogating detainees in relation to the events of the uprising. The NSA and MoI followed a systematic practice of physical and psychological mistreatment, which in many cases amounted to torture. Only four of the individuals who alleged torture were arrested by the BDF. The Bahrain Independent Commission of Inquiry have attributed the deaths of five individuals to torture.

=== Brazil ===
Torture was used regularly by the Brazilian dictatorship regime from 1964 to 1977 against dissidents. It included torturing their children, some of whom were less than 2 years old at the time.

=== Cambodia ===
Torture was used by the Khmer Rouge at the S-21 Prison.

=== Chile ===
The regime of Augusto Pinochet in Chile in the 1970s used torture extensively against political opponents. Chile's National Commission on Political Imprisonment and Torture (Comisión Nacional sobre Prisión Política y Tortura) concluded in 2004 that torture had been a systematically implemented policy of the government, and recommended reparations. The commission heard the testimony of more than 35,000 witnesses, whose testimonies are to be kept secret for fifty years. Among those tortured were future president Michelle Bachelet, who was held along with her mother at the notorious Villa Grimaldi detention center in the capital Santiago.

=== China ===
Although torture was outlawed in China in 1996, a UN investigator found torture to still be widespread in 2005, particularly because the narrow definition of the law, leaving a mark, does not comply with the UN definition.

Torture is reportedly used as part of the indoctrination process at the Xinjiang re-education camps.

=== Cuba ===
People imprisoned by the communist regime are reportedly tortured.

=== East Germany ===
In the socialist German Democratic Republic of divided Germany, torture and inhumane and degrading treatment were systematically used by security forces, including the Stasi secret police, against suspected opponents of the regime.

=== France ===
During the Algerian War of Independence (1954–1962), the French military used torture against the National Liberation Front and the civilian population. The French interrogators were notorious for the use of man-powered electrical generators on suspects: this form of torture was called (la) gégène.

That France has provided a pivotal role in the evolution of western torture practices is the central thesis of the French film Death Squadrons: The French School by Monique Robin. The French had themselves developed practices in defence of its declining empire through the 20th century, setting up torture "universities" at Poulo Condor (now Côn Sơn) – an island off Vietnam (then French Indo-China, subsequently taken over by the United States) and at Philippeville (now Skikda) in Algeria.

Police abuse remains a reality in France today, while France has been condemned by the European Court of Human Rights (ECHR) for the conditions of detention in prisons, including the use of torture on detainees. Although the law and the Constitution prohibits any kind of torture, such practices happen. In 2004, the Inspector General of the National Police received 469 registered complaints about illegitimate police violence during the first 11 months of the year, down from 500 during the same period in 2003. There were 59 confirmed cases of police violence, compared to 65 in the previous year. In April 2004, the ECHR condemned the government for "inhumane and degrading treatments" in the 1997 case of a teenager beaten while in police custody. The court ordered the government to pay Giovanni Rivas $20,500 (15,000 euros) in damages and $13,500 (10,000 euros) in court costs. The head of the police station in Saint-Denis, near Paris, has been forced to resign after allegations of rape and other violence committed by the police force under his orders. Nine investigations concerning police abuse in this police station were carried out in 2005 by the IGS inspection of police. These repeated abuses are said to be one of the causes of the 2005 civil unrest. Conditions in detention centers for illegal aliens have also been widely criticized by human rights NGOs. In 2006 a 20-year-old Serbian woman accused a policeman of attempting to rape her in such a centre in Bobigny, in the suburbs of Paris, the year before.

=== Guatemala ===
During the Guatemalan civil war and the repression by the army against civilians and suspected opponents of the military dictatorship, murder (even genocide), torture, rape and inhumane and degrading treatment was systematically used by the Guatemalan armed forces and police. There is evidence that the CIA, in anticommunist campaigns during the 1980s, was involved in these tortures (in Latin America the threat of communism was often used as justification for dictatorship during the Cold War). Thousands of victims were tortured and murdered. For example, Dianna Ortiz, an American nun who was teaching poor Mayan children in the Guatemala highlands, claims that U.S. personnel were present in interrogation and torture rooms in Guatemala City in 1989 when she was kidnapped, taken to a secret prison and repeatedly raped and tortured by Guatemalan right-wing forces. Ortiz survived because of her American citizenship. Sister Ortiz chronicled her experiences and recovery in a book, The Blindfold's Eyes. "There were other people in the clandestine cell, the clandestine prison, as well, and I could hear terrible screams. Many were killed. I saw some bodies. There were children, as well", wrote Dianna Ortiz.

=== India ===
India has not ratified the UN Convention against Torture. Custodial deaths and extrajudicial killings are on the rise. The Asian Centre for Human Rights released its report, Torture in India 2010, at a press conference in New Delhi. The report stated that, taking 2000 as the base year, custodial deaths have decreased by 41.66% government between 2004–2005 to 2007–2008. This includes 70.72% increase of deaths in prison and 12.60% increase while in police custody. The government has stated that it intends to pass the Anti Torture Act 2010 so it can ratify the UN convention against torture. The bill provides up to a 10-year sentence for physical or mental torture by the police.

=== Iran ===
Article 38 of the constitution of the Islamic Republic forbids "all forms of torture for the purpose of extracting confession or acquiring information" and the "compulsion of individuals to testify, confess, or take an oath." It also states that "any testimony, confession, or oath obtained under duress is devoid of value and credence." The Islamic Republic itself vehemently denies the existence of torture by the government.

Nonetheless, human rights groups and observers, such as Amnesty International, the United Nations, and Human Rights Watch, have complained that torture is frequently used on political prisoners in Iran.

A substantial number of Iranians have been tortured and imprisoned by the religious police. Arya Aramnejad, a singer, was jailed for his song "Ali Barkhiz" where he denounces the Islamic regime's crimes during the 2009 Ashura protests. During his time in prison, he was reportedly tortured (sexually humiliated – photographed naked, laughed at, obliged to walk barefooted on aids' patients blood). Farzad Kamangar was repeatedly tortured in prison. Amnesty International reports that Kamangar was repeatedly beaten, flogged, and electrocuted, and that he now suffers from spasms in his arms and legs as a result of the torture. After she died in the custody of Iranian officials, Zahra "Ziba" Kazemi-Ahmadabadi, an Iranian-Canadian freelance photographer, was found to show obvious signs of torture, including a skull fracture, broken nose, signs of rape and severe abdominal bruising. Ehsan Fatahian, an Iranian Kurdish activist, was tortured for confession before being executed. Zeynab Jalalian, also a Kurdish activist, is currently ill due to prison conditions and torture. She has been sentenced to death. Other notable victims include Behrouz Javid Tehrani, Habibollah Latifi, Houshang Asadi, Saeed Malekpour, Shirkoh (Bahman) Moarefi, Hossein Khezri, and Akbar Mohammadi.

In a study of torture in Iran published in 1999, Iranian-born political historian Ervand Abrahamian included Iran along with "Stalinist Russia, Maoist China, and early modern Europe" of the Inquisition and witch hunts, as societies that "can be considered to be in a league of their own" in the systematic use of torture.

Torture techniques used in the Islamic Republic include:

whipping, sometimes of the back but most often of the feet with the body tied on an iron bed; the qapani; deprivation of sleep; suspension from ceiling and high walls; twisting of forearms until they broke; crushing of hands and fingers between metal presses; insertion of sharp instruments under the fingernails; cigarette burns; submersion under water; standing in one place for hours on end; mock executions; and physical threats against family members. Of these, the most prevalent was the whipping of soles, obviously because it was explicitly sanctioned by the sharia.

Chronicle of Higher Education International, reports that the widespread practice of raping women imprisoned for engaging in political protest has been effective in keeping female college students "less outspoken and less likely to take part" in political demonstrations. The journal quotes an Iranian college student as saying, "most of the girls arrested are raped in jail. Families can't cope with that."

Several bills passed the Iranian Parliament that would have had Iran joining the international convention on banning torture in 2003 when reformists controlled Parliament, but were rejected by the Guardian Council.

=== Iraq ===
The government headed by Baathist Saddam Hussein made extensive use of torture, including at the notorious Abu Ghraib prison.

The post-invasion Iraqi government holds thousands of people in prison. After investigating from July to October 2004, Human Rights Watch found that torture was "routine and commonplace." According to their report,

Methods of torture or ill-treatment cited included routine beatings to the body using a variety of implements such as cables, hosepipes and metal rods. Detainees reported kicking, slapping and punching; prolonged suspension from the wrists with the hands tied behind the back; electric shocks to sensitive parts of the body, including the earlobes and genitals; and being kept blindfolded and/or handcuffed continuously for several days. In several cases, the detainees suffered what may be permanent physical disability.

— Human Rights Watch,

Despite apparently credible claims that people were fed into Saddam Hussein's plastic shredder (most likely within Abu Ghraib) prior to the 2003 invasion of Iraq, no such device was found after the war. In October 1990, it was alleged that Iraqi soldiers had "thrown babies from incubators" during the invasion of Kuwait. This story was supposed to have come from the 'eyewitness testimony' of a 15-year-old Kuwaiti girl, Nurse Nayirah. Years later it emerged that she was the daughter of Saud bin Nasir Al-Sabah, Kuwait's ambassador to the United States, and that the story was the creation of the Hill & Knowlton public relations firm employed by the Kuwaitis.

=== Israel ===
In 1987, Israel became the only country in the world where torture was considered legal.

After investigation of continued allegations of torture, the Supreme Court made another ruling in 1999 that curtailed the use of torture, but controversially allowed a necessity defense for agents of the state accused of torture. This decision was praised by human-rights organizations. Despite this reform of the law, Amnesty International continued to express concerns to Israel about treatment which amounts to torture, and remained unhappy about the steps taken by Israel to eliminate torture. Amnesty International stated in 2002:

...the Israeli HCJ in September 1999 banned a number of interrogation methods ...However the judgment left ... loopholes by which methods amounting to torture or other ill-treatment in detention may continue.

— Amnesty International,

In 2018 another decision loosened the criteria for torture being excused and further enabled the institutionalization of torture.

The human rights group B'Tselem estimated that 85% of all Palestinian detainees suspected of terrorism were subject to prolonged sleep deprivation; prolonged sight deprivation or sensory deprivation; forced, prolonged maintenance of body positions that grow increasingly painful; confinement in tiny, closet-like spaces; exposure to temperature extremes, such as in deliberately overcooled rooms; prolonged toilet and hygiene deprivation; and degrading treatment, such as forcing detainees to eat and use the toilet at the same time. Allegations have been made of frequent beatings. Such acts violate Article 16 of the United Nations Convention Against Torture. In January 2000, B'Tselem claimed that the Israeli General Security Service's (GSS) methods of interrogation amounted to the five techniques: "[The] GSS used methods comparable to those used by the British in 1971, viz. sleep deprivation, infliction of physical suffering, and sensory isolation. But the GSS used them for much longer periods, so the resulting pain and suffering were substantially greater. In addition, the GSS used direct violence... Thus,... in practice, the GSS methods were substantially more severe than those used by the British in 1971..."

==== Torture during the Gaza war ====
During the Gaza war, Israel has been accused of systematically torturing Palestinians detained in its prison system. This torture has been reported by the United Nations, Human Rights Watch, Amnesty International, as well as Israeli nonprofit human rights organizations such as Physicians for Human Rights Israel and B'Tselem.

According to these sources, Palestinian men, women and children in Gaza and in detainment in Israel in locations such as the Sde Teiman detention camp have been subjected to rape, gang-rape, sexualized torture, and mutilation, among other forms of sexual violence, as well as psychological and physical torture by both male and female Israeli soldiers and medical staff.

Some of the victims were United Nations staff forced to confess to terrorism offenses. Multiple reports also speak of prisoners who suffered from medical neglect for injuries sustained, which led to cases of arm and leg amputations. Their testimonies have been corroborated by whistleblowing Israeli staff and a CNN investigation.

As of August 2024, at least 53 Palestinian detainees have died in Israeli military facilities since the beginning of the war. Numerous Palestinian detainees have provided testimony of torture by Israeli forces, including during interrogations, Israeli prison guards also spoke out. There were further reports of the Israeli torture of accused militants.

In response, Shin Bet officials stated they conduct militant interrogations within the Israeli legal framework. According to Yuval Ginbar, torture is considered legal under certain circumstances.

=== Kenya ===
Mau Mau inflicted torture and death on 1,819 Kikuyu during their uprising in the 1950s, along with 58 people of European and Asian descent.

=== Lebanon ===
Suspected Hezbollah guerrillas, their families and Lebanese civilian internees were previously detained in the South Lebanon Army (SLA) prison at Khiam in the then Israeli-occupied Southern Lebanon. Torture, including electric shock torture, by the SLA was routine. This was detailed after the end of the occupation in 2000, when Lebanese who freed the prisoners found instruments of torture.

=== Nigeria ===
In 2005, Human Rights Watch documented that Nigerian police in the cities of Enugu, Lagos and Kano routinely practice torture. Dozens of witnesses and survivors stepped forward to testify to repeated, severe beatings, abuse of sexual organs, rape, death threats, injury by shooting, and the denial of food and water. These abuses were used in campaigns against common crime.

Systematic torture was used in conjunction with military occupation in an attempt to quell anti-oil protests by the Ogoni people in the Niger Delta, according to a World Council of Churches report.

Christian pastors in Nigeria have been involved in the torturing and killing of children accused of witchcraft. Church pastors, in an effort to distinguish from the competition, establish their credentials by accusing children of witchcraft. When repeatedly asked to comment about the matter, the Church has refused to comment.

=== North Korea ===
Torture is widespread and used with impunity in North Korea's system of prisons and forced labor camps. Guards have the power to inflict severe beatings, simulated drownings, stress positions, starvation, confinement in small spaces, hanging by the wrists or ankles, electric shocks, and sexual abuse.

=== North Vietnam ===
From 1961 to 1973, the North Vietnamese and Vietcong held hundreds of Americans captive. Hanoi's Ministry of Public Security's Medical Office (MPSMO) was responsible for "preparing studies and performing research on the most effective Soviet, French, Communist Chinese and other ...techniques..." of extracting information from POWs. The MPSMO "...supervised the use of torture and the use of drugs to induce [American] prisoners to cooperate." Its functions also "...included working with Soviet and Communist Chinese intelligence advisors who were qualified in the use of medical techniques for intelligence purposes."

See Con Son Island for accounts of US torture practices.

=== Palestinian Territories ===
The Palestinian Authority has reportedly practiced torture in the Palestinian territories over the years. Amnesty International found: "Torture [by the Palestine Authority] of detainees remained widespread. Seven detainees died in custody. Unlawful killings, including possible extrajudicial executions, continued to be reported."

In 1995, Azzam Rahim, a naturalized American citizen, was arrested by the Palestinian Authority in the West Bank. He was subsequently taken to a prison in Jericho where he was tortured and killed. Rahim's family attempted to sue the PA and the Palestine Liberation Organization, but the Supreme Court ultimately ruled against them.

More than 100 cases of torture by Palestinian security services were reported in 2010. Joe Stork, deputy Middle East director at Human Rights Watch, said: "The reports of torture by Palestinian security services keep rolling in. President Abbas and Prime Minister Fayyad are well aware of the situation. They need to reverse this rampant impunity and make sure that those responsible are prosecuted."

At least six Palestinians died under torture in PA prisons. According to a report by the Arab Organization for Human Rights in Britain, the PA has used torture on a systematic basis for years. Methods include beatings with cables, pulling out nails, suspension from the ceiling, flogging, kicking, cursing, electric shocks, sexual harassment and the threat of rape. The report went on to say "Every one of those detainees has been subject to humiliating and degrading treatment and stayed in cells for more than 10 days. The analysis shows that an astonishing 95 percent of the detainees were subjected to severe torture, others feeling the detrimental effects on their health for varying periods." The shabeh, which involves detainees being handcuffed and bound in stress positions for longs stretches of time, is the most widely used form of torture.

In 2012, after allegedly selling a house in Hebron to a Jewish family, Muhammad Abu Shahala was arrested by the Palestinian Authority, tortured into a confession, and sentenced to death.

Human Rights Watch reported 147 cases of torture by Hamas in the West Bank during 2011 and that none of the perpetrators had been prosecuted "despite consistent allegations of severe abuse." It further stated that "Some men said they had needed medical care due to torture and sought to obtain medical records as evidence that they had been tortured, but that hospital officials refused to provide them. Hamas's rival in the West Bank, the Fatah-dominated Palestinian Authority, arrests and detains Palestinians arbitrarily, including Hamas members or sympathizers, and similarly subjects detainees to torture and abuse."

In another report, Human Rights Watch "documents cases in which [Palestinian] security forces tortured, beat, and arbitrarily detained journalists, confiscated their equipment, and barred them from leaving the West Bank and Gaza." HRW also reported an incident in which "the Hamas Ministry of Interior summoned a journalist who published an article on torture by Hamas authorities in secret detention facilities, threatened to take legal action against him if he did not publish an apology for the article, and warned him to correct his 'biased' reporting."

=== Papua New Guinea ===
Despite international and national exposure, torture in Papua remains widespread and systematic; it is also surrounded by virtually complete impunity and denial. A study by the International Journal of Conflict and Violence found 431 cases of torture in Papua New Guinea.

=== Philippines ===
During the rule of Ferdinand Marcos, torture and degrading treatment were routine in police custody. Political prisoners were often beaten, burned with irons, placed in stress positions, sexually abused, and subjected to electric shock, among other severe methods.

=== Portugal ===
During the Estado Novo in Portugal, the secret police is known to have used torture on political prisoners. Detainees were forced to remain standing for hours on end in a method called the "statue" (Portuguese: estátua), were kept in cramped, wet cells with no natural light, were beaten during trials, faced threats against themselves and their family members, or were forced to listen to the same music or sounds for extended periods of time. These practices were revealed in an inquiry and subsequent investigation and trial of secret police practices in 1957.

=== Romania ===
Under the communist regime of Gheorghe Gheorghiu-Dej, and later that of Nicolae Ceaușescu, torture was often used against political and religious prisoners, including those incarcerated during the notorious Pitești Experiment.

Torture as a penalty was abolished after the fall of the communist regime.

From 2003 through 2005, during the war on terror, Romania hosted a secret CIA black site where prisoners were tortured.

=== Russia ===
The Constitution of Russia forbids arbitrary detention, torture and ill-treatment. Part 2 of Article 21 of the Constitution states that "no one may be subjected to torture, violence or any other harsh or humiliating treatment or punishment...". However Russian police are regularly observed practicing torture – including beatings, electric shocks, rape, asphyxiation – in interrogating arrested suspects.

Torture and humiliation, or dedovshchina, are also widespread in Russian's military, according to Human Rights Watch. This is essentially the Russian version of bullying or hazing that is practiced in the American military, however it is often much more brutal. Many young men are killed or commit suicide every year because of it. Amnesty International reported on allegations of Chechen locals, that Russian military forces in Chechnya rape and torture local women with electric shocks, when electric wires are connected to the straps of their bra on their chest.

In the most extreme cases, hundreds of innocent people from the street were arbitrarily arrested, beaten, tortured, and raped by special police forces ("Red Terror"). Such incidents took place not only in Chechnya, but also in the Russian towns of Blagoveshensk, Bezetsk, and Nefteyugansk.

=== Saudi Arabia ===
Saudi Arabia officially considers torture illegal under Islamic Law; however, it is widely practiced, as in the case of William Sampson. According to a 2003 report by Amnesty International, "torture and ill-treatment remained rife." Hanny Megally, executive director of the Middle East and North Africa division of Human Rights Watch, stated in 2002 "The practice of torture in Saudi Arabia is well documented", According to the Human Rights Watch World Report 2003, "Torture under interrogation of political prisoners and criminal suspects continued", and the 2006 report notes that "Arbitrary detention, mistreatment and torture of detainees, restrictions on freedom of movement, and lack of official accountability remain serious concerns".

=== South Africa ===
According to Amnesty International, torture takes place in police stations, prisons, detention centres and beyond. During 2014/2015, the Independent Police Investigative Directorate (IPID) investigated 145 new reported cases it described as torture, 34 cases listed as rape and 3,711 cases listed as assault by police officers. Of the 145 cases described as torture, only four were referred to the National Prosecuting Authority by IPID for criminal charges during that same time period. This reflects serious problems with accountability.

=== Soviet Union ===
Torture was widely practiced by the brutal Cheka during the early days of the Red Army, followed by the Soviet NKVD during the early Stalinist era to extract (often false) confessions from suspects often called enemies of the people. One of the most prevalent and effective types of torture was sleep deprivation, nicknamed "conveyor" due to interrogators replacing one another to keep the inmate from sleeping. The use of torture was authorized by the Central Committee of the Communist Party and personally by Joseph Stalin. During the Doctor's Plot, Stalin ordered falsely accused physicians to be tortured "to death". Torture was still used after Stalin by the KGB but not on the same extent and level.

=== Spain ===
Torture was widespread against dissidents and those associated with them in the years that Francisco Franco ruled Spain. Such abuses continued into the 1970s and included severe beatings and waterboarding.

The Spanish kingdom today categorically denies the existence of torture. However, the Spanish authorities consistently fail to implement recommendations by the Council of Europe's Committee for the Prevention of Torture and the UN Committee Against Torture to combat the use of torture in detention. The UN committee expressed its concern "about the length of judicial procedures and made reference to reports that indicated that five years had sometimes passed between crime and sentence. The Committee warned that this problem reduces the effect of penal action and discourages people to file complaints." It further indicated that "all members of the Committee were also deeply concerned about the legal practice of five days incommunicado detention" (since October 2003, a reform of the Criminal Procedure Code has extended that period to a maximum of 13 days).

=== Syria ===
Torture has reportedly been used in the Adra Prison near Damascus. In 2010, the prison held 7,000 prisoners. The Tadmor Prison in Palmyra was known for harsh conditions, extensive human rights abuse, torture and summary executions. It was closed in 2001 and all remaining political detainees were transferred to other prisons in Syria. However, Tadmor Prison was reopened on 15 June 2011 and 350 individuals arrested for participation in anti-regime demonstrations were transferred there for interrogation and detainment.

A number of captured Israelis have been tortured in Syria. This includes Eli Cohen, who was executed in 1965. In 1955, five Israeli soldiers were captured in a covert operation on the Golan Heights and brutally tortured in a Syrian prison. One of the soldiers, Uri Ilan, committed suicide when falsely informed by his captors that his comrades had been killed. Ilan became a symbol of courage and patriotism in Israel. During the Yom Kippur War, many Israeli prisoners said that they had been tortured by Syrians, and one POW, Avraham Lanir, was tortured to death after he refused to disclose information about the Israeli nuclear arsenal.

During the Syrian Civil War, reports have been made of widespread and systematic torture used by Syrian security forces. This includes electrocution, brutal beatings and sexual assault. Amnesty said of the situation : "Torture and other ill-treatment in Syria form part of a widespread and systematic attack against the civilian population, carried out in an organized manner and as part of state policy and therefore amount to crimes against humanity." In February 2019, two Syrians were arrested in Germany on suspicion of having conducted or abetted torture for the regime of Bashar al-Assad during the Syrian Civil War.

=== Thailand ===
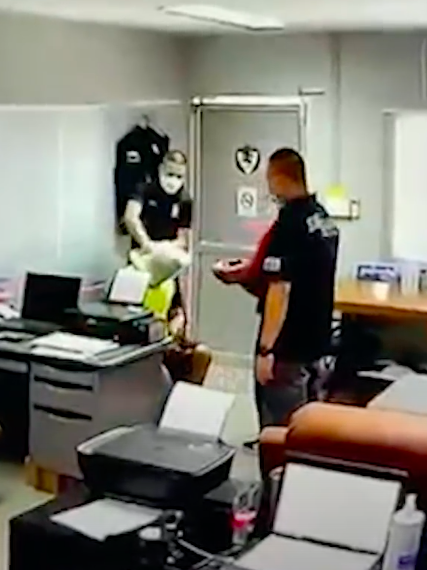
CCTV footage in a Thai police station posted online appears to show the suspect being ordered to pay $60,000 to have charges dropped before he is suffocated to death with a plastic bag.

The Constitution of Thailand prohibits acts of torture, but the country's legal system does not define torture, and torture is not recognised as an offence by this system.

In a report titled "Make Him Speak by Tomorrow": Torture and other Ill-Treatment in Thailand, which was planned for formal release in Bangkok on 28 September 2016, Amnesty International accused the Thai police and military of 74 incidents of brutality. An Amnesty press conference to unveil the report was halted by Thai authorities, who cited Thai labour laws prohibiting visiting foreigners from working in Thailand. The three foreign speakers were as follows: Rafendi Djamin, Amnesty's director for Southeast Asia and the Pacific; Yubal Ginbar, a lawyer working for Amnesty; and Laurent Meillan, acting Southeast Asia representative for OHCHR. The Thai government denied the torture allegations. The government's spokesman, General Sansern Kaewkamnerd, emphasised that "Our investigations into such allegations have shown no indication of torture, I have seen no indication of torture and the Thai people have seen no indication of torture..." Jeremy Laurence, a representative of OHCHR, had been scheduled to speak at the press conference. He said, "This incident is another striking illustration of a new pattern of harassment of human rights defenders documenting torture in Thailand".

Thailand has been a signatory to the United Nations Convention against Torture since 2 October 2007. Section 28 of the Thai 2016 constitution states that "A torture, [sic] brutal act or punishment by cruel or inhumane means shall be prohibited."

A bill to prevent torture and enforced disappearance was scheduled to be presented before Thailand's National Legislative Assembly (NLA) in late December 2018. The bill would criminalise torture and enforced disappearances, including during wars and political unrest. The draft law specified that the Department of Special Investigation (DSI) would be responsible for investigating cases of enforced disappearance and torture. Only in events where DSI officials were accused of such crimes would police be assigned to investigate. Imprisonment for 5 to 25 years, and/or a fine of 100,000 to 300,000 baht, would be imposed on guilty parties. If the bill became a law, every government agency restricting people's rights would be required to maintain a database of people whose rights were restricted, the actions taken, and the disposition of their cases.

On 5 August 2021, the Thai police assaulted Jeerapong Thanapat, a 24-year-old drug suspect, during interrogation to force him to reveal hidden methamphetamines and pay a bribe of two million baht (or US$61,000) for his release. The video appears to show the superintendent of the Muang Nakhon Sawan Province police station – Thitisan Utthanaphon, widely known by the nickname "Jo Ferrari" – and other police officers suffocating Thanapat with plastic bags until he collapsed and died. The police reportedly ordered doctors at Sawanpracharak Hospital to write in a medical report that the cause of Jeerapong's death was a methamphetamine overdose. In June 2022, Thitisan was convicted of the suspect's killing and sentenced to life in prison.

=== United Arab Emirates ===
In April 2009, a video emerged of a United Arab Emirates Royal Sheik, Sheik Issa bin Zayed Al Nahyan (a son of Zayed bin Sultan Al Nahyan) directing the torture of Afghan grain dealer Mohammed Shah Poor. The video includes the man being tortured with a cattle prod to his genitals, sand in his mouth and being run over by a Mercedes SUV. A man in a UAE police uniform is seen on the tape tying the victim's arms and legs, and later holding him down. The official response of the UAE government was that Sheik Issa is the man shown in the video but he did nothing wrong. The incidents depicted in the videotapes were not part of a pattern of behaviour, the Ministry of the Interior said.

The UAE runs secret prisons in Yemen where prisoners are forcibly disappeared and tortured.

=== United Kingdom ===
==== Kenya ====
During the 1950's, a rebellion against British rule in Kenya known as the Mau Mau rebellion broke out, spearheaded by the Kenya Land and Freedom Army (better known as the "Mau Mau"). During their suppression of the rebellion, British security forces routinely used torture on suspected Mau Mau insurgents. Upon discovering that nearly the entire Kikiyu population – numbering over a million – had taken an oath to support the Mau Mau in their struggle, the British colonial authorities imprisoned suspected insurgents in concentration camps in order to try and coerce them into repudiating the Mau Mau oath; hundreds of thousands of Kikuyus were imprisoned in the camps during the rebellion. In these camps, detainees were frequently subject to brutal mistreatment, including torture, by camp wardens and prison guard. These included methods such as rape, mutilation, and stuffing a detainee's mouth with mud and stamping on their throat. Instances of the wardens and guards intentionally denying medical aid to detainees were widespread, which compounded the effects of torture at the camps. A former British prison official in Kenya described a detention camp there in 1954: "Short rations, overwork, brutality, humiliating and disgusting treatment, flogging – all in violation of the UN Declaration of Human Rights." According to Canon Bewes, a British missionary in Kenya, there was a "constant stream of reports of brutalities by police, military and home guards. Some of the people had been using castration instruments and two men had died under castration."

One of the detainees who was tortured during the Mau Mau rebellion was Hussein Onyango Obama, the grandfather of U.S. President Barack Obama. According to his widow, "British soldiers forced pins into his fingernails and buttocks and squeezed his testicles between metal rods" at the Kamiti Prison. One British settler described an interrogation by the colonial police force:

We knew the slow method of torture [at the Mau Mau Investigation Center] was worse than anything we could do. Special Branch there had a way of slowly electrocuting a Kuke—they'd rough up one for days. Once I went personally to drop off one gang member who needed special treatment. I stayed for a few hours to help the boys out, softening him up. Things got a little out of hand. By the time I cut his balls off, he had no ears, and his eyeball, the right one, I think, was hanging out of its socket. Too bad, he died before we got much out of him.

On 22 November 1954, Colonel Arthur Young sent a letter to Governor Evelyn Baring about the "inhumanity" of various parts of the security forces amid his investigations of wrongdoing:

The other lamentable aspect of this case [i.e. Judgment of the East Africa Court of Appeal, Criminal Appeals 891 and 892 of 1954] is the horror of some of the so called Screening Camps which, in my judgment, now present a state of affairs so deplorable that they should be investigated without delay so that the ever increasing allegations of inhumanity and disregard of the rights of the African citizen are dealt with and so that Government will have no reason either to be embarrassed or ashamed of the acts which are done in its name by its own servants. As things are at present there is no one who can investigate such allegations and no independent authority who is responsible for the conduct at these camps. An African who is unfortunate enough to suffer from the brutalities which are clearly evident has no one to whom he can complain and no one to regard his interests since the local Administrative Officer is, himself, the authority for the camps. Moreover, the injured person is unlikely to appeal to the police for redress if they are to be regarded as subordinate to the Executive...I do not consider that in the present circumstances Government have taken all the necessary steps to ensure that in its Screening Camps the elementary principles of justice and humanity are observed.

In January 1955, Baring sent a telegram to Alan Lennox-Boyd, the Secretary of State for the Colonies and a cabinet minister, and told them that eight white European officers who had been accused of serious crimes, including accessory to murder, would be given immunity from prosecution. One district officer was accused of the "beating up and roasting alive of one African". A Kenyan Regiment Sergeant and a field intelligence assistance had been implicated in the burning of two further suspects "during screening operations". "I had not myself realised until today that the extension of the principle of clemency to all members of the security forces involved so many cases with Europeans as principals," wrote Baring.

In 1956, Baring's administration devised the "dilution technique" – a system of assaults and psychological shocks to detainees, to force the compliance of the toughest Mau Mau supporters. Lennox-Boyd was told that one commander, Terrence Gavaghan, had developed the techniques at the Mwea camps in central Kenya – and he needed permission to treat the worst detainees in a "rough way". Baring telegrammed the Colonial Secretary in London asking for his approval to use "overpowering" force, and the cabinet minister's approval came within weeks. A ministerial delegation saw firsthand prisoners beaten for refusing to don camp clothes. Ringleaders of the "Mau Mau moan" – a chant of defiance – were singled out for special punishment. They were beaten and forced to the ground. Once there, a boot was placed on their throat while mud was forced into their mouths. Gavaghan also explained how difficult detainees would be subjected to the "third degree". "The measures adopted were to be kept awake all night, having water thrown at him and to be beaten up on a variety of pretexts."

One Hanslope Park document is a letter between Kenyan Special Branch police officers about treatment of "fanatical" detainees at the Mwea camps.

If they deny having taken an oath they are given summary punishment which usually consists of a good beating up. This treatment usually breaks a large proportion. If this treatment does not bear fruit the detainee is taken to the far end of the camp where buckets of stone are waiting. These buckets are placed on the detainee's head and he is made to run around in circles until he agrees to confess the oath.

In June 1957, Eric Griffith-Jones, the attorney general of the British administration in Kenya, wrote to Baring, detailing the way the regime of abuse at the colony's detention camps was being subtly altered. He said that the mistreatment of the detainees is "distressingly reminiscent of conditions in Nazi Germany or Communist Russia". Despite this, he said that in order for abuse to remain legal, Mau Mau suspects must be beaten mainly on their upper body, "vulnerable parts of the body should not be struck, particularly the spleen, liver or kidneys", and it was important that "those who administer violence ... should remain collected, balanced and dispassionate". He also agreed to draft legislation that sanctioned beatings, as long as the abuse was kept secret, and reminded the governor that "If we are going to sin," he wrote, "we must sin quietly."

==== Northern Ireland ====
During the Troubles, an ethno-nationalist conflict in Northern Ireland, there were instances of British security forces, including the British Army and the Royal Ulster Constabulary (RUC), using torture on suspected Irish Republican Army (IRA) members. Former RUC interrogators who were active during the Troubles claimed that waterboarding, among other forms of torture, were systematically used against suspected IRA members in police custody.

In 1971, as part of Operation Demetrius, fourteen arrested men were subjected to a programme of "deep interrogation" at a secret interrogation centre. The interrogation methods involved sensory deprivation and were referred to as the "Five Techniques". The European Court of Human Rights defined them as wall-standing, hooding, subjection to noise, deprivation of sleep, and deprivation of food and drink. For seven days, when not being interrogated, the detainees were kept hooded and handcuffed in a cold cell and subjected to a continuous loud hissing noise. Here they were forced to stand in a stress position for many hours and were deprived of sleep, food and drink. They were also repeatedly beaten, and some reported being kicked in the genitals, having their heads banged against walls and being threatened with injections. The effect was severe pain, severe physical and mental exhaustion, severe anxiety, depression, hallucinations, disorientation and repeated loss of consciousness.

The fourteen so-called "Hooded Men" were the only detainees subjected to all Five Techniques together. Some other detainees were subjected to at least one of the Five Techniques, along with other interrogation methods. These allegedly included waterboarding, electric shocks, burning with matches and candles, forcing internees to stand over hot electric fires while beating them, beating and squeezing of the genitals, inserting objects into the anus, injections, whipping the soles of the feet, and psychological abuse such as Russian roulette.

Details of the "deep interrogation" programme became known to the public, sparking outrage. In response, the British Government commissioned an inquiry, under Lord Parker, to look into the Five Techniques. In 1972 the Parker Report concluded that the Five Techniques were illegal under domestic law. British Prime Minister Edward Heath, then announced that the Five Techniques would no longer be used under his government. However, he said that if a future British government decided to reintroduce them, it would need to be approved by Parliament.

The Irish Government had begun international legal action against the British Government over the Hooded Men in 1971. In 1976, the European Commission of Human Rights ruled that the programme of deep interrogation, using the Five Techniques, amounted to "torture". The case was then referred to the European Court of Human Rights. In 1978 it ruled that the programme amounted to "inhuman and degrading treatment" which breached the European Convention on Human Rights, but did not amount to torture. In 2014, evidence emerged that the British Government had withheld information from the Court. Following these revelations, the Irish Government announced in December 2014 that it would be asking the Court to review its judgement and acknowledge the Five Techniques as torture.

The Court's ruling, that the Five Techniques did not amount to torture, was later cited by the United States and Israel to justify their own interrogation methods.

==== 21st century ====
On 23 February 2005, British soldiers were found guilty of abuse of Iraqi prisoners arrested for looting at a British Army camp called Bread Basket, in Basra, during May 2003. The judge at the military court, Judge Advocate Michael Hunter, said of photographs and the soldier's behaviour:

Anyone with a shred of human decency would be revolted by what is contained in those pictures. The actions of you and those responsible for these acts have undoubtedly tarnished the international reputation of the British Army and, to some extent, the British nation too, and it will no doubt hamper the efforts of those who are now risking their lives striving to achieve stability in the Gulf region, and it will probably be used by those who are working against such ends.

— Judge Advocate Michael Hunter

At the court martial, the prosecution alleged that in giving the order to "work [the prisoners] hard", Captain Dan Taylor had broken the Geneva Conventions. Neither Taylor, nor his commanding officer Lt-Col Paterson (who was briefed on the operation "Ali Baba" by Taylor), was sanctioned and, indeed, during the period of time between the offence and the trial, both were given promotions. All the leaders of the major British political parties condemned the abuse. Tony Blair, British Prime Minister, declared that the pictures were "shocking and appalling". After sentencing, the Chief of the General Staff, General Sir Mike Jackson, made a statement on television and said that he was "appalled and disappointed" when he first saw photographs of the Iraqi detainees and that

The incidents depicted are in direct contradiction to the core values and standards of the British Army ... Nevertheless, in the light of the evidence from this trial I do apologize on behalf of the army to those Iraqis who were abused and to the people of Iraq as a whole.

— General Sir Mike Jackson

On 7 December 2005, the House of Lords reversed the deportations of Muslims convicted on "evidence procured by torture inflicted by foreign officials", and cited the 1978 case in ruling that centuries of common law and recent international conventions made torture anathema in the country's courts. Lord Bingham said it was "clear that from its very earliest days the common law of England set its face firmly against the use of torture"; Lord Nicholls said "Torture is not acceptable. This is a bedrock moral principle in this country"; Lord Hoffman said "The use of torture is dishonourable. It corrupts and degrades the state which uses it and the legal system which accepts it."; Lord Hope said it was "one of most evil practices known to man"; Lord Rodgers said "the unacceptable nature of torture ... has long been unquestioned in this country."; Lord Carswell referred to the "abhorrence felt by civilised nations for the use of torture"; and Lord Brown said that "torture is an unqualified evil. It can never be justified. Rather it must always be punished.".

On 13 March 2007, the six-month court martial of the seven soldiers – including Colonel Jorge Mendonca and Major Michael Peebles – over the detention of Iraqi prisoners in Basra during May 2003 ended with all but one, Corporal Donald Payne, being acquitted. On 30 April 2007, Payne, Britain's first convicted war criminal found guilty under the provisions of the International Criminal Court Act 2001, who had pleaded guilty to mistreating prisoners, was jailed for a year and dishonourably discharged from the army.

In March 2008, the Ministry of Defence admitted breaching the human rights of Baha Mousa, who died in British custody in Basra, and of eight other Iraqi men held at the same facility, opening the way for a multimillion-pound compensation package for the relatives of Baha Mousa and the other men injured during illegal interrogations. On 14 May 2008, Defence Secretary Des Browne announced in the House of Commons that there would be a public inquiry into the death of Baha Mousa in which "no stone [will be left] unturned in investigating his tragic death."

On 26 July 2008, the Joint Committee on Human Rights accused Armed Forces Minister Adam Ingram in 2004 and Lieutenant-General Robin Brims, Commander Field Army, in 2006 of misleading the committee when they declared that conditioning practices (based on the five techniques, banned since their use in Northern Ireland in the 1970s) were not being used. It has now emerged that such techniques were being used by some troops deployed abroad. The BBC reported that "Labour MP Andrew Dismore, chairman of the committee, said he hoped the public inquiry [into the death of Baha Mousa] would give some indications as to why they were given 'wrong evidence'. Earlier this month, the MoD agreed to pay almost £3m in compensation to Mr Mousa's family and nine Iraqi men after admitting breaching human rights".

=== United States ===
While the United States is a party to international conventions against torture, a proponent of human rights treaties and a critic of torture by other countries, torture has taken place within its borders and on its government's behalf outside of its borders.

On 13 December 1999, NYPD officer Justin Volpe was sentenced to thirty years in prison for sodomizing detainee Abner Louima with the handle of a bathroom plunger.

The Chicago Police Department's Area 2 unit under Commander Jon Burge repeatedly used electroshock, near-suffocation by plastic bags and excessive beating on suspects in the 1970s and 1980s. The City of Chicago's Office of Professional Standards (OPS) concluded that the physical abuse was systematic and, "The type of abuse described was not limited to the usual beating, but went into such esoteric areas as psychological techniques and planned torture." The Supermax facility at the Maine State Prison has been the scene of video-taped forcible extractions that Lance Tapley in the Portland Phoenix wrote "look[ed] like torture."

In 2003 and 2004, there was substantial controversy over the "stress and duress" methods that were used in the U.S. war on terrorism that had been sanctioned by the U.S. Executive branch of government at Cabinet level.

Amnesty International and numerous commentators have accused the Military Commissions Act of 2006 of approving a system that uses torture, destroying the mechanisms for judicial review created by the Supreme Court ruling in Hamdan v. Rumsfeld, and creating a parallel legal system below international standards.

In an interview with the Washington Post, the convening authority of the Guantanamo military commissions, Susan J. Crawford, a retired judge, who was responsible for reviewing practices at the Guantanamo Bay detention camp, said of one Guantanamo Bay detainee, "his treatment met the legal definition of torture, and that is why I did not refer the case" for prosecution. The U.S. Government denies that torture is being conducted in the detention camps at Guantanamo Bay.

It was reported in June 2008 that, according to human rights lawyers, the USA was "operating floating prisons to house those arrested in its war on terror":

"According to research carried out by Reprieve, the US may have used as many as 17 ships as 'floating prisons' since 2001. Detainees are interrogated aboard the vessels and then rendered to other, often undisclosed, locations, it is claimed. Ships that are understood to have held prisoners include the USS Bataan and USS Peleliu. A further 15 ships are suspected of having operated around the British territory of Diego Garcia in the Indian Ocean, which has been used as a military base by the UK and the Americans.
... The Reprieve study includes the account of a prisoner released from Guantánamo Bay, who described a fellow inmate's story of detention on an amphibious assault ship. 'One of my fellow prisoners in Guantánamo was at sea on an American ship with about 50 others before coming to Guantánamo ... he was in the cage next to me. He told me that there were about 50 other people on the ship. They were all closed off in the bottom of the ship. The prisoner commented to me that it was like something you see on TV. The people held on the ship were beaten even more severely than in Guantánamo.'"

=== Uzbekistan ===
After an investigating visit to Uzbekistan, United Nations Special Rapporteur on Torture Theo van Boven concluded:

Even though only a small number of torture cases can be proved with absolute certainty, the copious testimonies gathered ... are so consistent in their description of torture techniques and the places and circumstances in which torture is perpetrated that the pervasive and persistent nature of torture throughout the investigative process cannot be denied.

— Theo van Boven

Forms of torture frequently cited include immersion in boiling water, exposure to extreme heat and cold, "the use of electric shock, temporary suffocation, hanging by the ankles or wrists, removal of fingernails, punctures with sharp objects, rape, the threat of rape, and the threat of murder of family members." (For example, see Muzafar Avazov.)

In 2003, Britain's Ambassador for Uzbekistan, Craig Murray, said that information was being extracted under extreme torture from dissidents in that country, and that the information was subsequently being used by Britain and other western, democratic countries which disapproved of torture.

=== Venezuela ===
Under the dictator Marcos Pérez Jiménez, Venezuelan authorities held little regard for the human rights of citizens. Police often raided homes without search warrants and individuals were imprisoned without evidence. While initially detained, individuals faced torture in instances of interrogation. Political police targeted, arrested, tortured and killed his opponents. Those who were attacked include future Venezuelan president Rómulo Betancourt, Jaime Lusinchi and Luis Herrera Campins. Lusinchi was jailed for two months in 1952 and was beaten with a sword. According to Human Rights Watch, the Carlos Andrés Pérez administration also tortured and executed opponents with a judicial branch that largely ignored abuses by his government. The Caracas Metropolitan Police [es] and DISIP were used as tools to persecute dissenters. Following the 1992 Venezuelan coup d'état attempts, a crackdown on alleged plotters resulted in accusations of torture by those arrested. During the Bolivarian Revolution, levels of torture occurred that had not been seen since the dictatorship of Pérez Jiménez. Following the election of Hugo Chávez, human rights in Venezuela deteriorated. By 2009, the Inter-American Commission on Human Rights released a report stating that Venezuela's government practiced "repression and intolerance". In November 2014, Venezuela appeared before the United Nations Committee Against Torture over cases between 2002 and 2014, which criticized the Venezuelan National Commission for the Prevention of Torture for being biased in favor towards the Bolivarian government. The committee had also expressed concern with "beatings, burnings and electric shocks in efforts to obtain confessions" that occurred during the 2014 Venezuelan protests and that of the 185 investigations for abuses during the protests, only 5 individuals had been charged. United Nations Special Rapporteur on Torture Juan E. Méndez stated on 11 March 2015 that Venezuela had ignored requests for information and that he had made "conclusions based on the lack of response" and "concluded that the government violated the rights of prisoners", further saying that the Maduro government failed "with the obligation to investigate, prosecute and punish all acts of torture and cruel, inhuman or degrading treatment".

During the presidency of Nicolás Maduro, torture in Venezuela increased further. In La Tumba, one of the headquarters and prisons of SEBIN, has been used for white torture and some of its prisoners have attempted suicide. Conditions in La Tumba have resulted with prisoner illnesses, though Venezuelan authorities refuse to medically treat those imprisoned. Bright lights are continuously left on and prison cells are set at near-freezing temperatures.

During the 2017 Venezuelan protests, more than 290 cases of torture were documented by the Organization of American States. Human Rights Watch has documented over 350 cases of torture and abuse. Methods include severe beatings, cutting the soles of the feet with razors, partial asphyxiation, withholding food and medication, and electric shock.

=== Zimbabwe ===
The government of Robert Mugabe, in power from 1980 to 2017, has been accused of torturing protestors and members of the political opposition.

== See also ==
- Command responsibility
- Secret police
