= Israeli torture in Palestine =

Israeli torture in Palestine may refer to:

- Israeli torture of Palestinians
- Torture in Palestine § Israelis

== See also ==
- Torture during the Gaza war
