= Israeli torture of Palestinians =

Israeli torture of Palestinians refers to the use of torture and systematic degrading practices on Palestinians detained by Israeli forces in both the West Bank and Gaza Strip. The practice, routine for decades, was eventually reviewed by the Supreme Court of Israel in 1999, which found that "coercive interrogation" of Palestinians had been widespread, and deemed it unlawful, though permissible in certain cases. Torture is also practiced by the Palestinian authorities in the West Bank and the Gaza Strip.

== Background ==
According to Lisa Hajjar (2005) and Dr. Rachel Stroumsa, the director of the Public Committee Against Torture in Israel, torture has been an abiding characteristic of Israeli methods of interrogation of Palestinians. Though formally banned by the High Court in 1999, legalized exceptions, authorized by the Attorney General of Israel, persist. (Note: "subsequent regulations issued by the then-Attorney General Elyakim Rubinstein said interrogators who nevertheless used torture would not stand trial if they could demonstrate that it was 'immediately necessary to save his own or another person's life, freedom, person or property from a concrete danger of serious harm', and that 'there was no other way to do so.' The regulations stipulated, however, that only very senior officials could permit the use of these methods, and that any interrogator who used them must keep a detailed record of the number of blows, the painful positions and all other so-called special means used. In addition, the attorney general must be informed after every use of such methods.") According to Addameer, Israeli physicians are also complicit in interrogations involving torture. (Note: ‘the majority of torture practices are preceded by medical examinations of detainees to green-light torture.’)

== Legal situation ==
In 1987, Israel became the only country in the world where torture was considered legal. The Supreme Court made another ruling in 1999 that curtailed the use of torture, but controversially allowed a necessity defense for agents of the state accused of torture. In 2018 another decision loosened the criteria for torture being excused and further enabled the institutionalization of torture.

== During the early occupation years ==
Reports of torture as a means of extracting confessions arguably began early in the occupation, on evidence for the first decade. In June 1977 the Sunday Times claimed torture was used against the Arab population of the occupied territories. In early 1978 an employee of the US Consulate in East Jerusalem, Alexandra Johnson, (Note: She was dismissed from her position shortly afterwards, despite recognition of the excellence of her work as an analyst, on the ostensible grounds she did not get on well with her colleagues.) sent two cables detailing evidence Israeli authorities were systematically using torture on West Bank suspects in Nablus, Ramallah, Hebron and the Russian compound of Jerusalem. Early reports indicated detainees were stripped naked and subject for long periods to cold showers or cold air ventilation. People were hung from meat hooks in Hebron and Ramallah. She concluded torture was applied at three rising levels of maltreatment, (a) level one: daily beatings with fists and sticks; (b) level two: alternate immersions of the victim in hot and cold water, beating of genitals and interrogation about twice daily over several hours; (c) level three: rotating teams of interrogators working on a nude person under detention by applying electrical devices, high frequency sonic noise, refrigeration, prolonged hanging by the hands or feet, and inserting objects into their penises or rectums. This last level was used on those who refused at earlier levels to denounce other Palestinians. At the time, Israel described these allegations as "fantastic horror stories." In private, however, Prime Minister Menachem Begin ordered a curtailing of the use of violent interrogation techniques, after which the allegations of torture decreased for the next several years. The hiatus on torture ended in the early 1980s.

78% of a sample of 40 detainees in 1985 said they had been sexually molested, and 67% stated they had been humiliated on religious grounds. Former inmates of the secret detention centre Camp 1391, whose existence is not even officially acknowledged, claim sexual harassment, even rape, forms part of the interrogation techniques. The first important study was conducted by the first Palestinian NGO, al-Haq, in 1986, which focused on practices at the Al Fara'a Detention Centre.

== During the First Intifada and onwards ==
Other techniques include shabeh, a practice 76% of the Israel public (1998) thought a form of torture, but only 27% opposed its use against Palestinians. Methods vary. For example, it may consist of being forced to sit on a very small chair, with a hood over one's head, and forced to listen loud musc. It could, as with one woman, last up to 10 days, night and day; also included among torture techniques was the beating of the bare soles of detainees' feet (falaqa), or subjecting them, while deprived of sleep, to endless lectures on themes like: "All Arabs are Bedouin, and Bedouin are Saudis, so Palestinians should go back to Saudi Arabia, where they came from. You don't belong here." (Note: Speaking of completing course work for becoming an intelligence officer, one former member of Unit 8100 said it ended with a full dress performance of pretending to be Palestinians, with the students shouting: "Enough with Palestine, we want to relocate to Australia!") Blindfolding is used so that the suspect can never anticipate when he is to be struck. In the First Intifada, other than prolonged beatings, people, including children, could be smeared with vomit or urine, be confined in a "coffin", be suspended by the wrists; be denied food and water or access to toilets, or be threatened to have their sisters, wives or mothers raped. Methods, including torture, practiced also on Palestinian children were reported to persist with Amnesty International stating in 2018 that though over 1,000 complaints have been filed regarding these practices since 2001, "no criminal investigations were opened." (Note: One case, where a Palestinian woman was forced to undergo two successive vaginal and anal probes during a single night raid conducted by the IDF under Shin Bet instructions, may prove an exception. Her protest was ignored, she spent two years in prison for minor offenses, and was then re-imprisoned for "nationalist" activities, and finally fled abroad due to trauma and shame. Only the persistence of an Israeli woman attorney Jana Mudzgurishvilly, in the Mivtan unit that closed all the other 1,000 cases, brought her complaint to the attention of the Justice Department, which has yet to decide what steps to take.)

Human rights organizations have reported specifically on the torture of minors by Israel. During the Human Rights Watch reported in 2002 that over 300 Palestinian minors had been tortured through beating, deprivation of sleep and dousing with freezing water. Israeli human rights group B'Tselem reported similarly in 2001 that Palestinian minors had their heads covered and subject to severe beatings and other abuse. B'Tselem concluded that these reports were "not isolated cases or uncommon conduct by certain police officers, but methods of torture adopted at the police station." Upon filing complaints with Israeli officials, B'Tselem reports that "the authorities have made no serious effort to address the root of the problem. Similarly, they have made no attempt to prosecute the violent police officers."

One major case, in which 20 men from Beita and Huwara were taken from their homes, gagged and bound hand and foot and then had their limbs broken with clubs, eventually reached the Israeli Supreme Court. (Note: The description is that of the Supreme Court judge Moshe Bejski, who had survived the Holocaust as one of those on Oskar Schindler's list.) In 2017, the alleged torture of Fawzi al-Junaidi, a 16 year old Palestinian boy, in Israeli detention drew media spotlight. A roadside bomb in 2019 leading to the death of an Israeli girl triggered a manhunt by the Shin Bet where up to 50 Palestinians were rounded up and reportedly subjected to some form of torture. 3 of the alleged suspects were hospitalised, one of them with kidney failure and 11 broken ribs while another was "nearly unrecognisable to his wife when he was wheeled into a courtroom".

Such torture is not thought to be very effective. A West Bank member of Hamas gave evidence under torture implicating himself and that organization in the 2014 kidnapping and murder of Israeli teenagers. The extorted confession turned out to be false. Recourse to Israeli courts to obtain recompense and rehabilitation for the psychological damage caused by being tortured are rarely conceded and are exceptional. Financial settlements were given for cases in the 1980s and 1990s, but only if the victim underwrote a clause which absolved the state of Israeli of declaring that the plaintiff had been a victim of torture.

== During the Gaza war ==
On November 8, Amnesty International reported on cases of torture and degrading treatment by Israeli authorities, which it described as "horrifying", "gruesome", and "a particularly chilling public display of torture and humiliation of Palestinian detainees." In relation to the recent spike in detentions, Amnesty's Secretary General, Agnès Callamard, noted that "arbitrary detention and torture and other ill-treatment are war crimes when committed against protected persons in an occupied territory."

On December 3, the United Nations Human Rights Office in the occupied Palestinian territories called for an investigation into allegations of torture. In a statement, the Office said: "The massive rise in number of Palestinians arrested and detained, the number of reports of ill-treatment and humiliation suffered by those in custody, and the reported failure to adhere to basic due process raise serious questions about Israel's compliance with international humanitarian law and international human rights law." On 19 January, the Human Rights Office stated they had interviewed detainees who "described being beaten, humiliated, subjected to ill-treatment, and to what may amount to torture... consistent with reports our Office has been gathering of the detention of Palestinians on a broad scale." In March 2024, a UNRWA report reported "countless" instances of torture documented in Israeli prisons, including beatings and sexual assault.

The Public Committee Against Torture in Israel (PCATI) stated that there was a "lot of evidence of cases of violence and cruel and humiliating treatment by prison guards", and called for an investigation into the deaths of detainees in Israeli custody. PCATI stated they had documented nine clear instances of torture, including sexual violence. On January 3, 2024, Human Rights Watch reported that Palestinian workers from Gaza detained in Israel since October 7 had been photographed naked, attacked by dogs, and dragged faced down in the gravel. In a report on allegations of torture in Israeli prisons, Euro-Med Monitor stated prisoners were being treated like animals. The Wall Street Journal found detainees underwent psychological and physical abuse, including beatings during interrogations. Doctors reported humiliation, beatings, and being forced to kneel for hours. Adalah reported, "We’re seeing really widespread and systemic use of many, many tools in order to inflict torture and ill-treatment on Palestinians".

A Defence for Children International report included the testimony of an incarcerated child who stated, "Around 18 children were severely beaten, screaming in pain. I saw police dogs attacking them, bleeding from the mouth and head." The United Nations human rights office reported some detainees were released wearing only diapers. Addameer reported that prisoners remained blindfolded and handcuffed during their detention and people were being killed in the military camps. In March 2024, the UN stated that Israel had detained and tortured its employees in Gaza to extract forced confessions.

As part of the Gaza peace plan, Israel returned the bodies of some Palestinian prisoners in October, 2025. The bodies of 135 Palestinians had been mutilated in Israeli custody.

According to Physicians for Human Rights – Israel (PHRI), at least 98 Palestinians have died in Israeli prisons and detention centers since October 2023. The group attributed these deaths to physical violence, inadequate medical care, and issues related to illness or nutrition.

== See also ==
- Crimes against humanity
- Far-right politics in Israel
- Human rights in Israel
- Arrest and detention of Palestinian minors by Israel

== Sources ==
- "CELL 26: A Study on the Use of Torture Against Palestinian Prisoners in Israeli Interrogation Centers" (PDF). Addameer. 13 June 2022.
- Aharony, Michal (15 November 2018). "Is It Possible to Recover From Torture? Lessons From Holocaust Survivor and Philosopher Jean Améry". Haaretz.
- Allen, Lori (2013). The Rise and Fall of Human Rights: Cynicism and Politics in Occupied Palestine. Stanford University Press. ISBN 978-0-804-78551-8.
- "Any Palestinian is exposed to monitoring by the Israeli Big Brother". The Guardian. 12 September 2014.
- Bishara, Ghassan (Summer 1979). "The Human Rights Case against Israel: The Policy of Torture". Journal of Palestine Studies. 8 (4): 3–30. doi:10.2307/2536365. JSTOR 2536365.
- Breiner, Josh; Berger, Yotam (2 November 2018). "Shin Bet Officers Suspected of Ordering Unwarranted Search of Palestinian Woman's Private Parts". Haaretz.
- Clarke, Benjamin (2013). "Terrorism, Torture and the Rule of Law". In Clarke, Benjamin; Mooney, T Brian; Imre, Robert (eds.). Responding to Terrorism: Political, Philosophical and Legal Perspectives. Ashgate Publishing. pp. 183–227. ISBN 978-1-409-49867-4.
- Conroy, John (2001). Unspeakable Acts, Ordinary People: The Dynamics of Torture. University of California Press. ISBN 978-0-520-23039-2.
- Graff, James A. (2015). "Targeting Children: Rights versus Realpolitik". In Kapitan, Tomis (ed.). Philosophical Perspectives on the Israeli-Palestinian Conflict (2nd ed.). Routledge. pp. 157–184. ISBN 978-1-317-46285-9.
- Hajjar, Lisa (2005). Courting Conflict: The Israeli Military Court System in the West Bank and Gaza. University of California Press. ISBN 978-0-520-24194-7.
- "Israel and Occupied Palestinian Territories" (PDF). Amnesty International Report 2017/18: The State of the World's Human Rights. Amnesty International. 2018b. pp. 207–211. ISBN 978-0-86210-499-3.
- Kathuria, Kanav (28 May 2024). "How Israeli prison doctors assist in the torture of Palestinian detainees". Mondoweiss.
- Levinson, Chaim (24 January 2017). "Torture, Israeli-style - as Described by the Interrogators Themselves". Haaretz.
- Montell, Jessica (Spring 2000). "Uncharted Territory: Generating Opposition to Torture in Israel". Bridges. 8 (1–2): 106–108. JSTOR 40358554.
- Peak, Kenneth J.; Everett, Pamela M. (2015). Introduction to Criminal Justice: Practice and Process. SAGE Publications. ISBN 978-1-506-30593-6.
- Punamäki, Raija-Leena (Summer 1988). "Experiences of Torture, Means of Coping, and Level of Symptoms among PalestinianPolitical Prisoners". Journal of Palestine Studies. 17 (4): 81–96. doi:10.2307/2537292. JSTOR 2537292.
- Torture and Intimidation in the West Bank: The Case of al-Fara'a Prison Al Haq. Al-Haq. 1986. Archived from the original on 3 December 2011.
- "Two Authorities, One Way, Zero Dissent: Arbitrary Arrest and Torture Under the Palestinian Authority and Hamas". Human Rights Watch. 23 October 2018.
- Weishut, Daniel J.N. (November 2015). "Sexual torture of Palestinian men by Israeli authorities". Reproductive Health Matters. 23 (46): 71–84. doi:10.1016/j.rhm.2015.11.019. JSTOR 26495868. PMID 26718999.
