= Donald Payne (British Army soldier) =

British soldier convicted of war crime

Corporal Donald Payne (born 9 September 1970) is a war criminal and former soldier of the Queen's Lancashire Regiment and later the Duke of Lancaster's Regiment of the British Army who became the first member of the British armed forces to be convicted of a war crime under the provisions of the International Criminal Court Act 2001 when he pleaded guilty on 19 September 2006 to a charge of inhumane treatment of a prisoner. He was jailed for one year and dismissed from the Army.

== Service career ==
Donald Payne joined the British Army on 5 June 1988, enlisting with the Queen's Lancashire Regiment, which subsequently amalgamated into the 1st Battalion The Duke of Lancaster's Regiment. He was promoted to the substantive rank of Corporal on 30 June 2000. As an NCO he worked as a Provost Corporal with the Regimental Provost in Catterick Garrison. He also served in Iraq, South Armagh, and the Former Yugoslavia

He had earned the following decorations/awards: General Service Medal with Northern Ireland clasp, NATO Medal with Former Yugoslavia clasp, Accumulated Campaign Service Medal, The Queen's Jubilee Medal and the Iraq Medal His service career ended on 30 April 2007 when he was reduced to the ranks and dismissed from Her Majesty's armed forces for his conduct in Iraq.

== War crimes ==
On 14 September 2003, a number of Iraqis were detained by British forces in raids on hotels in Basra. The detainees were taken to a three-room building in Basra, where they were questioned for 36 hours. Among the detainees was Baha Mousa, a 26-year-old employee of the Haitham Hotel in Basra, who died as a result of the interrogation. The subsequent post-mortem found 93 injuries, including fractured ribs and a broken nose. Detainees claimed that the British soldiers had held kicking competitions, competing to see who could kick the prisoners the furthest. Prisoners were also made to assume stress positions and were beaten and kicked if they failed to do so.

== Court martial ==
On 19 July 2005, Attorney General Lord Goldsmith announced that Payne was being charged with manslaughter, perverting the course of justice and inhumane treatment of persons under the International Criminal Court Act 2001. On the same day, another ten soldiers were also charged with similar crimes, six relating to the death of Mousa and four relating to the death of another Iraqi, Ahmed Jabber Kareem Ali, on 8 May 2003.

The Court Martial was held in Bulford Camp, Wiltshire, after an investigation by the Royal Military Police. It convened in the autumn of 2006, and concluded six months later in April 2007, being the most expensive Court Martial in modern British military history

During the court martial, Corporal Payne admitted he "enjoyed" hearing Iraqis call out during torture, describing their cries of pain as "the choir". He was cleared of manslaughter and perverting the course of justice. Six other soldiers were cleared of any charges.

After earlier pleading guilty to the offence of inhuman treatment of persons protected under the Geneva Conventions, Corporal Donald Payne was sentenced to 12 months imprisonment, reduced to the ranks, and dismissed from Her Majesty's Armed Forces, on 30 April 2007. On all other charges, Cpl Payne, and the other defendants, were acquitted when the presiding judge, Mr Justice McKinnon, ruled that there was no evidence against them.

Mr Justice McKinnon suggested that he believed there had been some level of covering-up with relation to the case, when he stated during the proceedings that "None of those soldiers has been charged with any offence, simply because there is no evidence against them as a result of a more or less obvious closing of ranks."

== Video of Payne abusing prisoners ==
On 13 July 2009, a video reportedly showing Cpl Payne abusing Iraqi prisoners was released as part of the evidence being presented to the public inquiry into the death of Baha Mousa. The video reportedly shows Cpl Payne forcing hooded and bound prisoners into stress positions, pushing and shoving prisoners, and aggressively shouting obscenities at them whilst they clearly vocalise their distress.

Procedures shown in the video were banned from use by British military personnel on 2 March 1972, by Edward Heath, the Prime Minister at the time, after IRA internees in Northern Ireland were subjected to similar techniques. The ban was announced the day the Parker Report was published and found them to be illegal under English law. In 1978 in the European Court of Human Rights in "Ireland v. the United Kingdom" (Case No. 5310/71) found the techniques used in Northern Ireland "amounted to inhuman and degrading treatment".
