= Killing of Baha Mousa =

Iraqi murder vicitm

Baha Mousa was an Iraqi man who died while in British Army custody in Basra, Iraq in September 2003. The inquiry into his death found that Mousa's death was caused by "factors including lack of food and water, heat, exhaustion, fear, previous injuries and the hooding and stress positions used by British troops - and a final struggle with his guards". The inquiry heard that Mousa was hooded for almost 24 hours during his 36 hours of custody by the 1st Battalion of the Queen's Lancashire Regiment and that he suffered at least 93 injuries before his death. The report later details that Mousa was subject to several practices banned under both domestic law and the Geneva Conventions. Seven British soldiers were charged in connection with the case. Six were found not guilty. Corporal Donald Payne pleaded guilty to inhumane treatment of a prisoner and was jailed for a year and dismissed from the Army. On 19 September 2006 with his guilty plea to inhumane treatment of Mousa, Payne became the first British soldier to admit to a war crime.

A final 1,400-page report said a "large number" of soldiers assaulted Mousa and that many others, including officers, must have known about the abuse. The report called his death an "appalling episode of serious gratuitous violence". The inquiry condemned the Ministry of Defence for "corporate failure" and the regiment for a "lack of moral courage to report abuse".

== Death ==
On 14 September 2003, Mousa, a 26-year-old hotel receptionist, was arrested along with six other men and taken to a British base. While in detention, Mousa and the other captives were hooded, severely beaten, and assaulted by a number of British troops. Two days later, Mousa was found dead. A post-mortem examination found that Mousa suffered at least 93 injuries, including fractured ribs and a broken nose, which were in part the cause of his death.

=== Investigation ===
Seven members of the Queen's Lancashire Regiment were tried on charges relating to the ill treatment of detainees, including war crimes under the International Criminal Court Act 2001. On 19 September 2006, Corporal Donald Payne pleaded guilty to a charge of inhumane treatment to persons, making him the first member of the British armed forces to plead guilty to a war crime. He was subsequently jailed for one year and expelled from the army. The BBC reported that the six other soldiers were cleared of any wrongdoing, and the Independent reported that the charges had been dropped, and that the presiding judge, Mr Justice McKinnon, stated that "none of those soldiers has been charged with any offence, simply because there is no evidence against them as a result of a more or less obvious closing of ranks."

== Court rulings based on this case ==
1. Colonel Jorge Mendonça – cleared of negligently performing a duty
2. Sergeant Kelvin Stacey – cleared of common assault
3. Lance Corporal Wayne Crowcroft – cleared of inhumane treatment
4. Private Darren Fallon – cleared of inhumane treatment
5. Corporal Donald Payne – admitted inhumane treatment, cleared of manslaughter and perverting the course of justice
6. Warrant Officer Mark Davies – cleared of negligently performing a duty
7. Major Michael Peebles – cleared of negligently performing a duty

== Breach of human rights ==
On 27 March 2008, British Defence Secretary Des Browne admitted to "substantial breaches" of the European Convention of Human Rights over the death of Mousa. In July 2008, the Ministry of Defence agreed to pay £2.83 million in compensation to the family of Baha Mousa and nine other men, following an admission of "substantive breaches" of articles 2 and 3 (right to life and prohibition of torture) of the European Convention on Human Rights by the British Army.

== Public inquiry ==
Logo from the inquiry's website

A public inquiry, chaired by the retired Lord Justice of Appeal Sir William Gage, reported on 8 September 2011 after three years of investigation. The report concluded British soldiers had subjected detainees to "serious, gratuitous violence". Army training manuals failed to explain that the five interrogation techniques used had been banned by the British since 1972 and were also illegal under the Geneva Convention.

The inquiry again cleared Mendonca of knowledge of the attacks, but found that as commanding officer he should have known of them. Although the Queen's Lancashire Regiment were cleared of an "entrenched culture of violence", the inquiry found the violence used in the Baha Mousa case was not a lone example and identified 19 soldiers directly involved in the abuses, including those already unsuccessfully tried at previous Courts Martial. Lawyers for families of the victims suggested there was sufficient evidence for fresh prosecutions in the civilian courts.

== Other enquiries ==
Derek Keilloh had treated Baha Mousa when he was a Medical Officer with the Queen's Lancashire Regiment. In December 2012, Keilloh was struck off the Medical Register after the Medical Practitioners Tribunal Service found him guilty of dishonest conduct in subsequent enquiries into Baha Mousa's death.
