= Ali Shallal al-Qaisi =

Iraqi torture survivor (born 1962)

- Born: علي شلال القیسي; 6 August 1962 (age 64); Baghdad, Iraq
- Known for: Victim of Abu Ghraib torture and prisoner abuse

Ali Shallal al-Qaisi (Arabic: علي شلال القیسي; born 6 August 1962) is an Iraqi civilian who was captured in United States custody during CIA interrogation and tortured at Abu Ghraib Prison in 2003. His name became known in 2004 when the prisoner torture and abuse at Abu Ghraib made news.

== Before the invasion ==
Al-Qaisi was a resident in Baghdad with no involvement in the military or government, however he was detained for protesting the invasion of his country. He owned a football pitch in Baghdad, which was seized during the invasion.

== Detaining and torture ==
Al-Qaisi was detained following his protesting of the invasion. He had collaborated with the press headquarters in Baghdad to reveal the human rights abuses being committed by the occupying forces.

His home was raided and he was arrested by American forces, and was then transported to a local interrogation centre, where he was asked to provide names of people who could be a threat. As he was uninvolved with any militias or government forces, he was unable to provide names and he was taken to Abu Ghraib, after being told he would be in a place where "even dogs couldn't live."

When he arrived, he was ordered to undress, and after refusing to remove his underwear he was forcibly stripped. Removing all clothes off prisoners at Abu Ghraib was a common form of sexual humiliation and dehumanisation of victims.

He was bound, beaten severely and forced to crawl to the top of stairs. He described the ordeal as feeling like "several hours."

Upon reaching the top he had a pistol held to his head while the recording of the word "اعدام" (execution) was repeatedly played. He was also smeared with excreta, and his head was almost always covered in a dark hood. Al-Qaisi was made to spend the night in a "stress position," and after the first night he claims to have completely lost track of the time.

He was tortured by having cold water dumped on him and sexually abused by having guns pushed into his lower regions. In some cases a broken broom handle was used to mutilate his genitalia, which required surgical attention. He was denied food for three days and was constantly blasted with loud music. He had cold water poured on him during December while completely exposed. Al-Qaisi says he got so exhausted that he could’ve gone to sleep standing up if the guards hadn't stopped him.

His hand, which was injured following a welding accident and required surgery, was used to further pressure him during interrogations. He would be ordered to lie down and then a guard would step on his injured hand and twist his boot. Furthermore, guards drew his damaged hand on the back of his jumpsuit with the degrading nickname assigned to him: "The Claw".

In the most notorious example of al-Qaisi's torture, he was draped in a poncho and made to stand on a box. He was hooked up to wires with his arms outstretched, and then he was electrified. Al-Qaisi described the pain as being as "if sparks had come out of [his] eyes."

The Hooded Man, the infamous picture from the prison showing a hooded man hooked up to wires, was not a photo of al-Qaisi, as he had claimed and as was initially reported by the New York Times in 2006. The newspaper ran a correction and an accompanying article within days saying the man was not al-Qaisi, but the error was repeated in other media outlets. The hooded man in the photo was actually a different man, Abdou Hussain Saad Faleh. The error and how it happened was discussed in the 2007 book Regret the Error, by Craig Silverman.

The torture had a destructive effect on al-Qaisi both physically and psychologically. Al-Qaisi said: "I'm spending sleepless nights thinking about the agony I went through … I even have recurring nightmares that I'm in my cell at Abu Ghraib, cell 49 as they called it, being tortured at the hands of the people of a great nation that carries the torch of freedom and human rights."

According to Al-Qaisi, the US military seized his football pitch for the purpose of dumping corpses and waste. He was arrested after attempting to contact foreign reporters about the incident.

Al-Qaisi has had to undergo six surgeries because of the torture he was subjected to. His left hand is mutilated due to electrocution.

== Current life ==
Al-Qaisi now lives in Berlin, Germany.

== See also ==
- Abu Ghraib torture and prisoner abuse
