= Kenneth Parker (judge) =

British judge (born 1945)

Sir Kenneth Parker
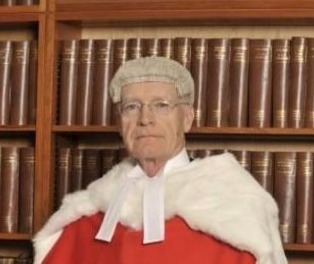
- Mr Justice Kenneth Parker in 2015

Justice of the High Court
- In office 2009–2015
- Preceded by: Sir Stuart McKinnon
- Succeeded by: Dame Bobbie Cheema-Grubb

Personal details
- Education: Kettering Grammar School; Exeter College, Oxford

Sir Kenneth Blades Parker (born 20 November 1945), formally styled The Hon. Mr Justice Kenneth Parker, is a former judge of the High Court of England and Wales.

He was educated at Kettering Grammar School and Exeter College, Oxford.

He was called to the bar at Gray's Inn in 1975. He was a judge of the High Court of Justice (Queen's Bench Division) from 2009 to 2015.

In the early 1970s, Sir Kenneth Parker taught law at Oxford. After gaining his BCL, He conducted jurisprudence lectures with his friend and colleague, Ronald Dworkin. Dworkin was one of the most eminent legal philosophers of the last 100 years, author of Taking Rights Seriously and Law's Empire, amongst other works.

During the 1980s and 1990s, Parker was a star corporate barrister at Monckton Chambers, which he eventually became Head of in 2003, and remained head until 2009 when he was appointed a High Court Judge. One of his notable cases as an advocate was representing the colorful CEO of Nabisco, F. Ross Johnson during its leveraged buyout. This story was told in the best-selling book Barbarians at the Gate.

As a High Court Judge, Parker adjudicated on many well-known cases. For example, The Bernie Ecclestone tax evasion trial and the Dale Farm Travellers eviction case. Since retirement, Parker has been working for MI6 and GCHQ on international cybersecurity with the Five Eyes Organisation. He also sits on a panel at the Competition and Markets Authority (CMA), which decides on the legality of large mergers which may affect the public interest.
