= Stress and duress =

Stress and duress is a term which has been used by the United States to describe interrogation techniques authorized for use by the United States Armed Forces upon detainees who are determined to be a threat to the United States during the war on terrorism. These techniques are claimed to cause "inhuman and degrading treatment" but which the George W. Bush administration claims do not cause "suffering of the particular intensity and cruelty implied by the word torture".

== Status of prisoners under the Geneva Conventions ==
Prisoners of war are covered by the Third Geneva Convention (GCIII) until and unless "their status has been determined by a competent tribunal (GCIII Art 5) to be that of civilians not affiliated with the armed forces or unlawful combatants, in which case they are covered by Fourth Geneva Convention (GCIV) unless they are "[n]ationals of a State which is not bound by the Convention [and therefore] not protected by it. Nationals of a neutral State who find themselves in the territory of a belligerent State, and nationals of a co-belligerent State, shall not be regarded as protected persons while the State of which they are nationals has normal diplomatic representation in the State in whose hands they are."(GCIV Art 4. paragraph 2). But even if they are covered by GCIV, the U.S. can waver a detainee's GCIV rights by invoking GCIV Article 5. "Where, in the territory of a Party to the conflict, the latter is satisfied that an individual protected person is definitely suspected of or engaged in activities hostile to the security of the State, such individual person shall not be entitled to claim such rights and privileges under the present Convention as would, if exercised in the favour of such individual person, be prejudicial to the security of such State." But "[i]n each case, such persons shall nevertheless be treated with humanity and, in case of trial, shall not be deprived of the rights of fair and regular trial prescribed by the present Convention. They shall also be granted the full rights and privileges of a protected person under the present Convention at the earliest date consistent with the security of the State or Occupying Power, as the case may be." (GCIV Art5)

Part I. General Provisions

...

Art. 5 Where in the territory of a Party to the conflict, the latter is satisfied that an individual protected person is definitely suspected of or engaged in activities hostile to the security of the State, such individual person shall not be entitled to claim such rights and privileges under the present Convention as would, if exercised in the favour of such individual person, be prejudicial to the security of such State.

Where in occupied territory an individual protected person is detained as a spy or saboteur, or as a person under definite suspicion of activity hostile to the security of the Occupying Power, such person shall, in those cases where absolute military security so requires, be regarded as having forfeited rights of communication under the present Convention.

In each case, such persons shall nevertheless be treated with humanity and, in case of trial, shall not be deprived of the rights of fair and regular trial prescribed by the present Convention. They shall also be granted the full rights and privileges of a protected person under the present Convention at the earliest date consistent with the security of the State or Occupying Power, as the case may be.

The status of prisoners held in Iraq may vary depending on whether they are held in an internal or an international conflict.

== Sensory deprivation techniques comprised torture ==
Although not binding upon non-participating member states of the Council of Europe, this ruling is a useful indicator of international judicial views on the "stress and duress" methods authorised for use by the US administration.

In 1978 in the European Court of Human Rights(ECHR) trial "Ireland v. the United Kingdom" the judges court published the following in their judgement:

These methods, sometimes termed "disorientation" or "sensory deprivation" techniques, were not used in any cases other than the fourteen so indicated above. It emerges from the Commission's establishment of the facts that the techniques consisted of ...wall-standing; hooding; subjection to noise; deprivation of sleep; deprivation of food and drink.

The Court ruled that the five techniques used together and combined with other abuses of the met the European definition of torture under the European Convention on Human Rights. The Court found that the five techniques, combined together, consisted of torture and inhuman treatment, hence fell under the Article 3 (art. 3), the practice of "inhuman and degrading treatment"., i.e.

"147. In its report, the Commission expressed the opinion....(iv) unanimously, that the combined use of the five techniques in the cases before it constituted a practice of inhuman treatment and of torture in breach of Article 3 (art. 3); (v) unanimously, that violations of Article 3 (art. 3) occurred by inhuman, and in two cases degrading, treatment"

== See also ==
- Command responsibility
- Enhanced interrogation techniques
- UN Convention Against Torture
