= Stuart McKinnon =

British judge (1938–2022)

Sir Stuart McKinnon

Justice of the High Court
- In office 20 January 1988 – 2009
- Preceded by: Unknown
- Succeeded by: Sir Kenneth Parker

Personal details
- Born: Stuart Neil McKinnon
- Died: Unknown

Sir Stuart Neil McKinnon (14 August 1938 – 28 February 2022) was a British barrister and judge. He was a Justice of the High Court, sitting in the Queen's Bench Division, from 1988 until 2009.

== Early life and legal career ==
Stuart McKinnon was the son of Australian-born Neil Nairn McKinnon QC, a barrister who became a circuit judge sitting at the Old Bailey. Two of his brothers, Rodney McKinnon and Warwick Nairn McKinnon KC, also became circuit judges.

McKinnon was educated at Dean Close School, Cheltenham, King's College School, Wimbledon and Trinity College, Cambridge (MA; LLB). He was called to the bar by Lincoln's Inn in 1960 and began practicing at the junior common law bar, eventually becoming head of chambers at 1 Crown Office Row (now 3 Hare Court). He became a QC in 1980 and sat as a recorder from 1985 to 1988. He was elected a bencher of Lincoln's Inn in 1987.

== Judicial career ==
McKinnon was appointed to the High Court bench on 20 January 1988 and received the customary knighthood in March that year. He was assigned to the Queen's Bench Division.

In 1991–1992, he tried the Blue Arrow bank fraud case, though he had only recently appointed to the bench and had limited experience in criminal law. Tried over a year in a purpose-built courtroom in Chancery Lane, it was said at the time to be the most expensive and second-longest criminal trial in English legal history. Four County NatWest executives were convicted and given suspended sentences by McKinnon; but their convictions were soon quashed by the Court of Appeal, which was critical of aspects of McKinnon's handling of the trial.

In 1994, he awarded £50,000 to Derek Threadway for being assaulted by members of West Midlands Police's serious crime squad, as a result of which he confessed to an armed robbery he did not commit and spent nine years in prison.

In 2002, he tried Stuart Campbell for the murder of his niece Danielle Jones.

In 2007, sitting as a judge advocate, he sentenced Corporal Donald Payne to 12 months' imprisonment on a charge of inhuman treatment of a person protected under the Fourth Geneva Convention. It was the first time a High Court judge had been appointed to conduct a court martial. Payne was the first member of the British armed forces to be convicted of a war crime under the provisions of the International Criminal Court Act 2001. McKinnon acquitted Payne of the remaining charges, as well as all his codefendants, although he suggested that there had been some level of covering-up with relation to the case.

Mr Justice McKinnon retired in 2009 and was succeeded by Sir Kenneth Parker. He died in 2022.
