= Torture in Palestine =

Torture and systematic degrading practices have been inflicted on civilians detained by Palestinian forces in the West Bank and the Gaza Strip. As of 2018, Amnesty reported that LGBT people were subjected to arbitrary arrest and ill-treatment.

== History ==
=== Palestinian Authority ===
The Palestinian Authority had reportedly practiced torture in Palestine over the years. In 1995, Azzam Rahim, a naturalized American citizen, was arrested by the Palestinian Authority in the West Bank. He was subsequently taken to a prison in Jericho where he was tortured and killed.

In 2007, Amnesty International found that "Torture [by the Palestine Authority] of detainees remained widespread. Seven detainees died in custody. Unlawful killings, including possible extrajudicial executions, continued to be reported."

More than 100 cases of torture by Palestinian security services were reported in 2010. Joe Stork, deputy Middle East director at Human Rights Watch, said: "The reports of torture by Palestinian security services keep rolling in. President Abbas and Prime Minister Fayyad are well aware of the situation. They need to reverse this rampant impunity and make sure that those responsible are prosecuted."

Human Rights Watch reported 147 cases of torture by Hamas in the West Bank during 2011 and that none of the perpetrators had been prosecuted "despite consistent allegations of severe abuse." It further stated that "Some men said they had needed medical care due to torture and sought to obtain medical records as evidence that they had been tortured, but that hospital officials refused to provide them. Hamas’s rival in the West Bank, the Fatah-dominated Palestinian Authority, arrests and detains Palestinians arbitrarily, including Hamas members or sympathizers, and similarly subjects detainees to torture and abuse."

In 2012, after allegedly selling a house in Hebron to a Jewish family, Muhammad Abu Shahala was arrested by the Palestinian Authority, tortured into a confession, and sentenced to death.

In another report, Human Rights Watch "documents cases in which [Palestinian] security forces tortured, beat, and arbitrarily detained journalists, confiscated their equipment, and barred them from leaving the West Bank and Gaza." HRW also reported an incident in which "the Hamas Ministry of Interior summoned a journalist who published an article on torture by Hamas authorities in secret detention facilities, threatened to take legal action against him if he did not publish an apology for the article, and warned him to correct his 'biased' reporting."

=== State of Palestine ===
While the State of Palestine’s ratified the Optional Protocol to the Convention against Torture and other Cruel, Inhuman or Degrading Treatment or Punishment on 29 December 2017, Palestinian security forces in the West Bank and Hamas security in Gaza continued using torture and other ill-treatment.

In 2018, The Independent Commission for Human Rights (ICHR) received 285 allegations of torture and other ill-treatment of detainees held by Palestinian security forces in the West Bank and by Hamas forces Gaza.

Also in 2018, the Human Rights Watch published that both Palestinian authorities and Hamas routinely arrest and torture opponents and critics, in what have been described as “parallel police states”.

== Practices on minorities and foreigners ==
=== Israelis ===
In 2017, Israel sued Palestinian administration for reportedly arresting and torturing fifty Arab citizens of Israel over the period of 1990s and early 2000s.

=== Palestinian LGBT community ===
As of 2018, Amnesty reported that lesbian, gay, bisexual, transgender and intersex (LGBTI) people were subjected to arbitrary arrest and ill-treatment.

=== Palestinian converts to Judaism ===
In one case in 2019, it was reported that Palestinian police arrested and had badly beaten two Palestinians in Hebron, who had converted to Judaism. The two, a man in his fifties and his son, received injuries including burns on arms and legs. The case took place in October 2019.
