= Shabeh (torture) =

Torture method

Shabeh (also sometimes called shabach) is a combined torture method that involves restraining a detainee in an awkward, painful position ("shabeh position"), playing loud music, covering the head with a sack, depriving them of sleep, and inflicting other suffering, for prolonged time, usually for several days, but it can be up to several months. Descriptions vary.

The Israel Security Agency (also known as "Shabak" or "Shin Bet") uses it, along with other methods, for the interrogation of Palestinian detainees. Shin Bet and the Office of the State Attorney of Israel argue that milder methods of shabeh are "security measures", rather than torture. In 2000, Jessica Montell reported that a 1998 opinion survey by B'Tselem found that 76% of Israelis agreed that shabeh constitutes torture; however, only 27% opposed to its common use while 35% approved its use in special "ticking bomb" cases.

In September 1999, Israel's High Court of Justice considered several petitions that contested the legality of the interrogation methods employed by Shin Bet, including shabeh. In a unanimous ruling all methods of physical force, including holding in the shabeh position, were outlawed.

== See also ==
- Stress position
