= Five techniques =

Group of interrogation methods developed by the United Kingdom

The five techniques, also known as deep interrogation, were a group of interrogation methods developed by the United Kingdom during the 20th century and are currently regarded as a form of torture. They are most notable for being applied to detainees in Northern Ireland during the Troubles.

The five collective methods were prolonged wall-standing, hooding, subjection to noise, deprivation of sleep, and deprivation of food and drink.

The use of the techniques was controversial, and in 1972 the UK government accepted the findings of an inquiry chaired by Lord Parker, the Lord Chief Justice of England that the techniques were illegal under British and Northern Irish law and issued directives prohibiting their use.

In 1976, the European Commission of Human Rights ruled that the five techniques amounted to torture. The case was then referred to the European Court of Human Rights. In 1978, the court ruled that the techniques were "inhuman and degrading" and breached Article 3 of the European Convention on Human Rights but did not amount to torture. In 2014, after new information was uncovered that showed the decision to use the five techniques in Northern Ireland in 1971–1972 had been taken by ministers, the Irish Government asked the European Court of Human Rights to review its judgement. In 2018, the Court declined.

In 2021, the Supreme Court of the United Kingdom found that the use of the five techniques amounted to torture.

== History ==
=== Operation Demetrius ===
The five techniques were first used in Northern Ireland in 1971 as part of Operation Demetrius – the mass arrest and internment of people ostensibly suspected of involvement with the Provisional Irish Republican Army (IRA). Out of those arrested, fourteen were selected not for any suspected involvement but purely on the basis of physical condition and subjected to a programme of "deep interrogation" using the five techniques. This took place at Shackleton Barracks, a secret interrogation centre in Northern Ireland.

For seven days, when not being interrogated, the detainees were kept hooded and handcuffed in a cold cell and subjected to a continuous loud hissing noise. Here they were forced to stand in a stress position for many hours and were deprived of sleep, food, and drink. They were also repeatedly beaten, and some reported being kicked in the genitals, having their heads banged against walls, and being threatened with injections. The effect was prolonged pain, physical and mental exhaustion, severe anxiety, depression, hallucinations, disorientation, and repeated loss of consciousness. It also resulted in long-term psychological trauma.

The fourteen became known as "the Hooded Men" and were the only detainees in Northern Ireland subjected to all five techniques together. Other detainees were subjected to at least one of the five techniques along with other interrogation methods.

=== Parker Report ===
In response to the public and Parliamentary disquiet on 16 November 1971, the Government commissioned a committee of inquiry chaired by Lord Parker, the Lord Chief Justice of England to look into the legal and moral aspects of the use of the five techniques.

The "Parker Report" was published on 2 March 1972. The majority, Lord Parker and John Boyd-Carpenter, concluded that "there is no real risk of such injury if proper safeguards are applied in the operation of these techniques", and recommended safeguards for their use. In a minority report, Lord Gardiner found the five techniques to be illegal under domestic law:

10. Domestic Law ...(c) We have received both written and oral representations from many legal bodies and individual lawyers from both England and Northern Ireland. There has been no dissent from the view that the procedures are illegal alike by the law of England and the law of Northern Ireland. ... (d) This being so, no Army Directive and no Minister could lawfully or validly have authorised the use of the procedures. Only Parliament can alter the law. The procedures were and are illegal.

Gardiner also noted that on the question of lasting mental harm "there is a considerable bibliography of experiments in this field, particularly in Canada".

On the same day (2 March 1972), the United Kingdom Prime Minister Edward Heath stated in the House of Commons:

[The] Government, having reviewed the whole matter with great care and with reference to any future operations, have decided that the techniques ... will not be used in future as an aid to interrogation... The statement that I have made covers all future circumstances.

Directives expressly prohibiting the use of the techniques, whether singly or in combination, were then issued to the security forces by the Government. These are still in force and the use of such methods by UK security forces would not be condoned by the Government.

=== European Commission of Human Rights inquiries and findings ===
The Irish Government, on behalf of the men who had been subject to the five methods, took a case to the European Commission on Human Rights. The Commission stated that it "considered the combined use of the five methods to amount to torture, on the grounds that (1) the intensity of the stress caused by techniques creating sensory deprivation "directly affects the personality physically and mentally"; and (2) "the systematic application of the techniques for the purpose of inducing a person to give information shows a clear resemblance to those methods of systematic torture which have been known over the ages... a modern system of torture falling into the same category as those systems... applied in previous times as a means of obtaining information and confessions".

=== European Court of Human Rights trial Ireland v. the United Kingdom ===
The commission's findings were appealed. In 1978, in the European Court of Human Rights (ECHR) trial Ireland v. United Kingdom (5310/71) [1978] ECHR 1, the facts were not in dispute and the judges court published the following in their judgement:

These methods, sometimes termed "disorientation" or "sensory deprivation" techniques, were not used in any cases other than the fourteen so indicated above. It emerges from the Commission's establishment of the facts that the techniques consisted of:

1. wall-standing: forcing the detainees to remain for periods of some hours in a "stress position", described by those who underwent it as being "spreadeagled against the wall, with their fingers put high above the head against the wall, the legs spread apart and the feet back, causing them to stand on their toes with the weight of the body mainly on the fingers";
2. hooding: putting a black or navy coloured bag over the detainees' heads and, at least initially, keeping it there all the time except during interrogation;
3. subjection to noise: pending their interrogations, holding the detainees in a room where there was a continuous loud and hissing noise;
4. deprivation of sleep: pending their interrogations, depriving the detainees of sleep;
5. deprivation of food and drink: subjecting the detainees to a reduced diet during their stay at the centre and pending interrogations.

These were referred to by the court as the five techniques. The court ruled:

167. ... Although the five techniques, as applied in combination, undoubtedly amounted to inhuman and degrading treatment, although their object was the extraction of confessions, the naming of others and/or information and although they were used systematically, they did not occasion suffering of the particular intensity and cruelty implied by the word torture as so understood. ...
168. The Court concludes that recourse to the five techniques amounted to a practice of inhuman and degrading treatment, which practice was in breach of [the European Convention on Human Rights] Article 3 (art. 3).

On 8 February 1977, in proceedings before the ECHR, and in line with the findings of the Parker report and United Kingdom Government policy, Samuel Silkin, the Attorney General for England and Wales and Attorney General for Northern Ireland, stated that

The Government of the United Kingdom have considered the question of the use of the 'five techniques' with very great care and with particular regard to Article 3 (art. 3) of the Convention. They now give this unqualified undertaking, that the 'five techniques' will not in any circumstances be reintroduced as an aid to interrogation.

=== Irish Government application to re-open case ===
On 2 December 2014, the Minister for Foreign Affairs and Trade Charles Flanagan announced that the Irish Government had asked European Court of Human Rights to revise its judgment following evidence uncovered by an RTÉ documentary called The Torture Files.

In 2018, the European Court of Human Rights decided not to revise its judgment by six votes to one.

=== Influence on US interrogation methods ===
The Court's ruling that the five techniques did not amount to torture was later internally cited by the United States to justify its own interrogation methods, which included the five techniques. British agents also taught the five techniques to the forces of Brazil's military dictatorship.

=== Use in Iraq ===
During the Iraq War, the illegal use of the five techniques by British service members contributed to the death of Baha Mousa.

=== UK Supreme Court Ruling ===
In 2021, the Supreme Court of the United Kingdom found that the use of the five techniques amounts to torture.

== See also ==
- Sensory deprivation
- Use of torture since 1948 § United Kingdom
