= Stress position =

Position that puts the human body in a great amount of pain

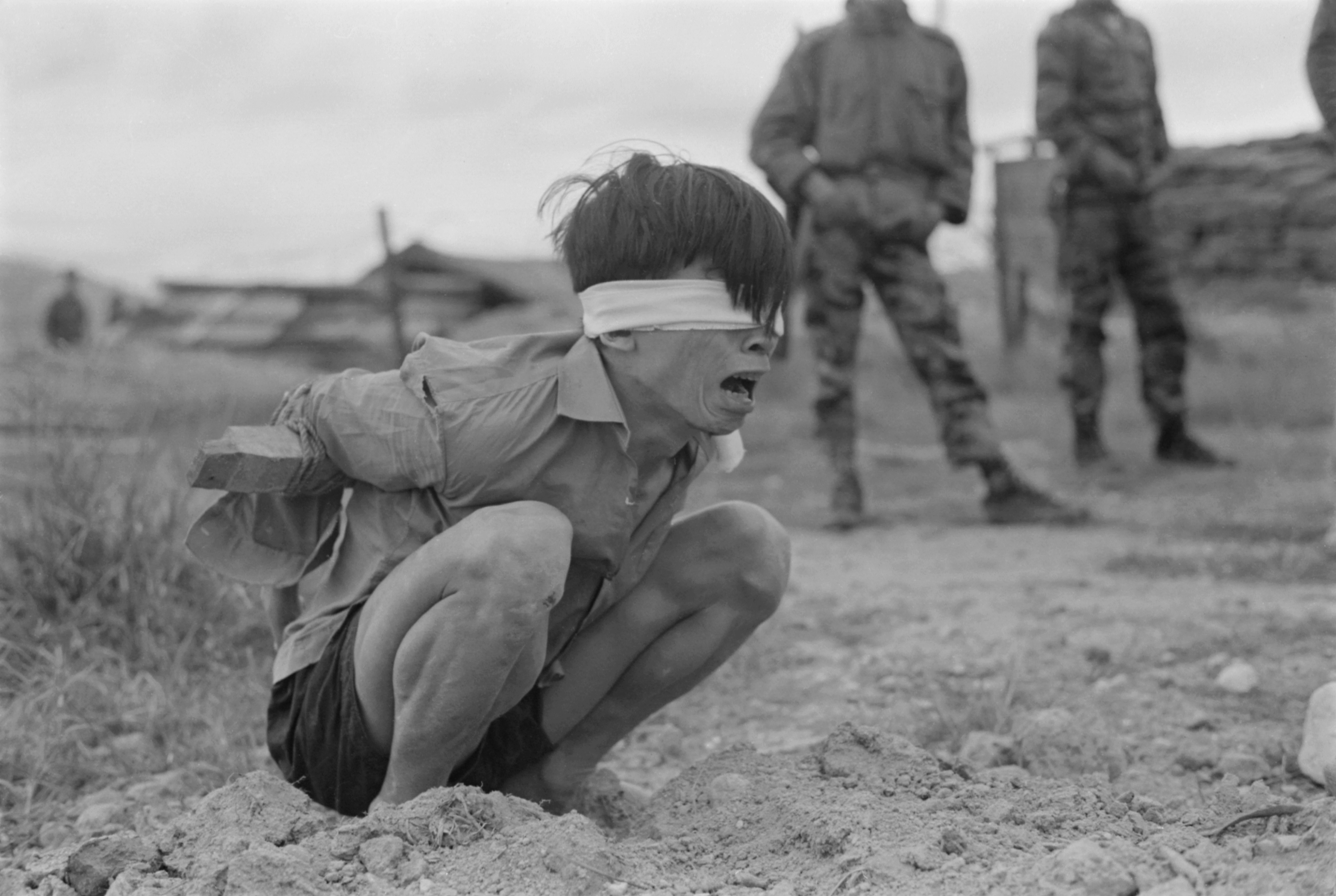
A Viet Cong prisoner, tied and blindfolded in a stress position, awaits interrogation at the A-109 Special Forces Detachment at Thường Ðức Camp during the Vietnam War, January 23, 1967

A stress position is a form of punishment or torture in which a person is forced into a painful physical position, often one that places a great amount of weight on very few muscles. For example, a subject may be forced to stand on the balls of their feet, then squat so that their thighs are parallel to the ground. This creates an intense amount of pressure on the legs, leading first to pain and then rapid onset of muscle fatigue.

In interrogation, stress positions are used to pressure prisoners into giving information. Courts have ruled the practice inhuman and degrading, and in some cases torture. In the Indian subcontinent, a stress position known as murga is used as a corporal punishment, particularly in schools. Elsewhere, stress positions have been documented mainly as instruments of interrogation and abuse: in prisons in Eritrea, by British forces in Northern Ireland and Iraq, by U.S. and South Vietnamese forces during the Vietnam War, and in U.S. military detention during the War on terror.

== Use by region ==
=== Indian subcontinent ===
Murga (also spelled murgha) is a stress position in which the punished person squats, loops their arms behind their knees, and holds their earlobes. The name means "rooster."

It is used as a corporal punishment in India and Pakistan. In schools, it serves as a disciplinary method that can be humiliating for the children punished. Police also use it as an informal punishment for petty crime and minor offences such as breaking COVID-19 lockdowns, sometimes administering it in public as a form of public humiliation.

In India, the Right of Children to Free and Compulsory Education Act, 2009 prohibits physical punishment and mental harassment of children in schools, and makes those who violate the ban liable to disciplinary action.

=== Eritrea ===
According to a 2004 report by Amnesty International, several stress-position torture methods were used in Eritrea, typically with the victim stripped to the waist.

==== Helicopter position ====
In the "helicopter position", the victim lies prone on the ground with their arms and feet bound behind their back. Victims are typically kept in this position for one or two weeks regardless of weather conditions, with only brief breaks for food and the toilet. In a variant, the cord binding the arms and feet is tied to a tree branch, suspending the victim off the ground.

One man, among a group of Eritreans deported from Malta in 2002, was tied in the helicopter position for 55 days after attempting to escape detention, at temperatures of up to 50 °C (122 °F), until his skin peeled off. He was then forced to live with one hand and arm tied behind his back for eight months. He later went on to study law in Canada.

==== Jesus Christ position ====
In the "Jesus Christ position", used at Adi-Abeto Prison since at least 2003, the victim stands on a block with their arms tied to the branches of a tree. The block is then removed, leaving them hanging in a position resembling crucifixion, and they are beaten on the back. The position is normally limited to ten to fifteen minutes so that the victim survives.

=== United Kingdom ===
In August and October 1971, fourteen detainees in Northern Ireland, twelve of them arrested during Operation Demetrius, were interrogated using the "five techniques": wall-standing, hooding, subjection to noise, deprivation of sleep, and deprivation of food and drink. Wall-standing forced detainees to remain for hours spreadeagled against a wall, fingers high above the head and feet set back, so that they stood on their toes with their weight mainly on their fingers. In Ireland v. United Kingdom (1978), the European Court of Human Rights held that the combined use of the techniques was inhuman and degrading treatment in breach of Article 3 of the European Convention on Human Rights, but did not amount to torture. On March 20, 2018, the Court dismissed, by six votes to one, Ireland's request to revise the judgment. In 2021, the Supreme Court of the United Kingdom stated that the treatment would likely be characterised as torture by present-day standards.

Stress positions continued to be used by British forces after the UK told the Court in 1977 that the techniques would not be reintroduced. The public inquiry into the 2003 death of Baha Mousa in British custody in Basra found that British soldiers had hooded Iraqi detainees and heard evidence that stress positions were also used.

=== United States ===
During the Vietnam War, both American and South Vietnamese forces subjected prisoners to stress positions, including chaining them by their raised arms so that their feet barely touched the ground, alongside other abuses such as confinement in barbed-wire cages and water torture.

In December 2002, U.S. Secretary of Defense Donald Rumsfeld approved the use of aggressive interrogation techniques, including stress positions, at Guantanamo Bay. Responding to a proposed four-hour limit on standing, he added a handwritten note: "However, I stand for 8-10 hours a day. Why is standing limited to 4 hours?" A 2008 inquiry by the Senate Armed Services Committee found that this authorization was a direct cause of detainee abuse at Guantanamo and contributed to the use of stress positions in Afghanistan and Iraq.

During the Iraq War, U.S. military interrogators could seek approval from Lt. Gen. Ricardo Sanchez, the commander of coalition forces, to use stress positions and other coercive methods. In May 2004, amid the Abu Ghraib scandal, he stopped considering such requests. The Senate committee later concluded that interrogation policies approved by Sanchez, which included stress positions, were a direct cause of detainee abuse in Iraq.

== See also ==
- Five techniques
- Psychological torture
- Imaginary chair
- Strappado also known as the corda or Palestinian hanging
- Submission hold
- Shabeh (torture)
- Pau de arara
