= Ethics of torture =

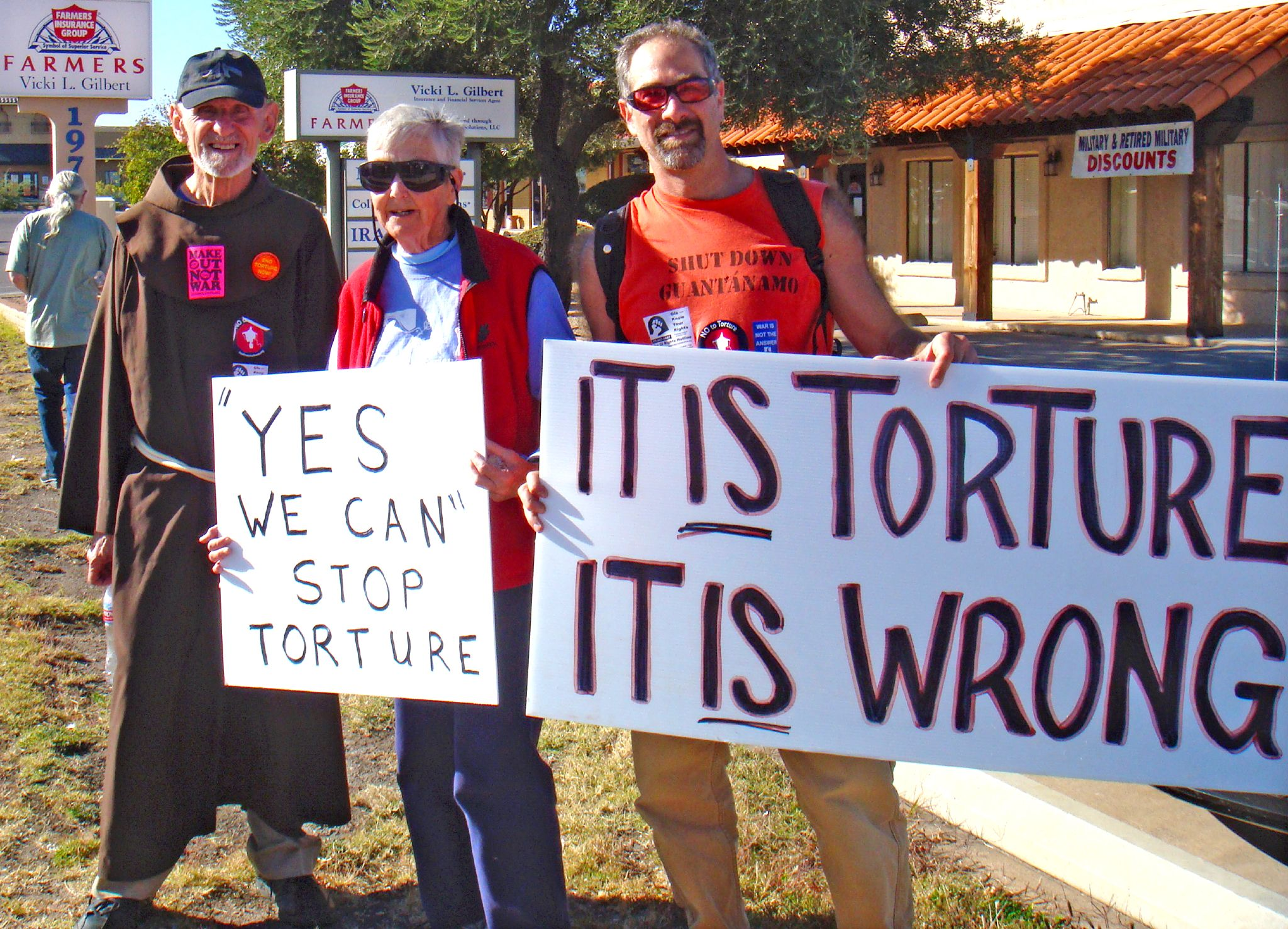
Franciscan friar Louis Vitale, Catholic nun Megan Rice, and Jim Haber protesting against torture by Guantanamo Bay detention camp

The prohibition of torture is a peremptory norm in public international law – meaning that it is forbidden under all circumstances – as well as being forbidden by international treaties such as the United Nations Convention Against Torture. It is generally agreed that torture is inherently morally wrong because all forms of torture "involve the intentional infliction of extreme physical suffering on some non-consenting and defenceless person", although it does not necessarily follow that torture is wrong in all circumstances. In practice, torture has been employed by many or most prisons, police and intelligence agencies throughout the world. Philosophers are divided on whether torture is forbidden under all circumstances or whether it may be justified in one-off situations, but without legalization or institutionalization.

== Premise ==
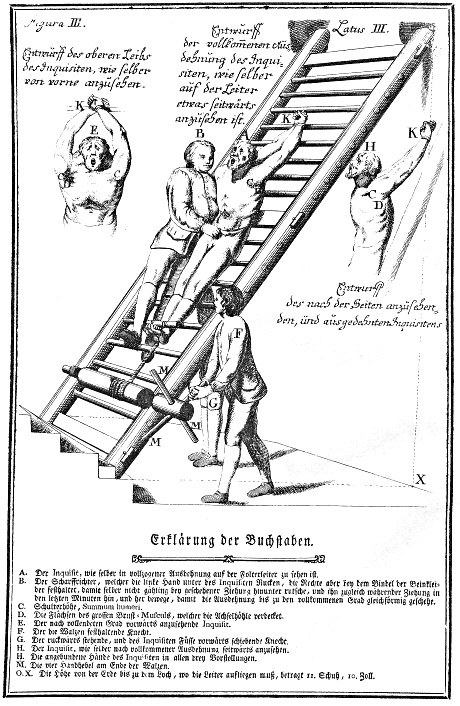
Constitutio Criminalis Theresiana (1768) – the approved methods of torture which could be used by the legal authorities to arrive at the truth.

The basic ethical debate is often presented as a matter of deontological versus utilitarian viewpoint. A utilitarian thinker may believe, when the overall outcome of lives saved due to torture are positive, torture can be justified; the intended outcome of an action is held as the primary factor in determining its merit or morality. If the outcome of torture resulted in an increase in utility, then a utilitarian would be able to justify that action of torture. They look only at whatever maximizes utility, rather than what seems to be right or wrong, based on our own judgements. Another view is deontological, from the Greek word deon (duty), which proposes general rules and values that are to be respected regardless of outcome. Deontological reasoning, unlike utilitarianism, does not focus solely on the consequences that follow from an action. Instead, this moral theory focuses on the rightness or wrongness of actions independently.

It has been suggested that one of the reasons torture endures is that torture indeed works in some instances to extract information/confession if those who are being tortured are indeed guilty. Richard Posner, a judge on the United States Court of Appeals for the Seventh Circuit, argued that "If torture is the only means of obtaining the information necessary to prevent the detonation of a nuclear bomb in Times Square, torture should be used – and will be used – to obtain the information. ... No one who doubts that this is the case should be in a position of responsibility." However, some experienced intelligence officers have come forward claiming that not only does torture not work, it can result in false information since people undergoing torture will say anything just to make the torture stop. Some people also point to neuroscience to demonstrate that torture may further impair a person's ability to tell the truth.

A utilitarian argument against torture is that torture is most often employed as a method of terrorizing and subjugating the population, not as a method of extracting information. This enables state forces to dispense with ordinary means of establishing innocence or guilt and with the whole legal apparatus altogether. Utilitarians share the belief that the right and moral thing to do in any given situation is the option that promotes the most happiness, and if torture is only used in order to hurt people with no gain, then it would not justify the action. Therefore, it is better that a few individuals be killed by bombers than a much greater number – possibly thousands of innocent people – be tortured and murdered and legal and constitutional provisions destroyed. During the investigation of Italian Prime Minister Aldo Moro's kidnapping, General Carlo Alberto Dalla Chiesa reportedly responded to a member of the security services who suggested torture against a suspect, "Italy can survive the loss of Aldo Moro. It would not survive the introduction of torture."

== History ==
Historically, torture has been reviled as an idea, yet employed as a tool and defended by its wielders, often in direct contradiction to their own averred beliefs. Judicial torture was a common feature of the legal systems of many countries including all civil law countries in Europe until the Enlightenment era. A papal bull forbade the practice of torture in Roman Catholic countries in 1816. This was part of ancient Greek and Roman law theory that remained valid in Europe. Roman law assumed, for example, that slaves would not tell the truth in a legal court as they were always vulnerable to threats from their owners. Their testimony could only be of value if it were extracted by a greater fear of torture. Legal scholars were well aware of the problems of false testimony produced by the threat of torture. In theory torture was not meant to produce a confession as such, but rather details of the crime or crime scene which only the guilty party would know. The Spanish Inquisition is an example in which torture was used to extract information regarding allegations of heresy.

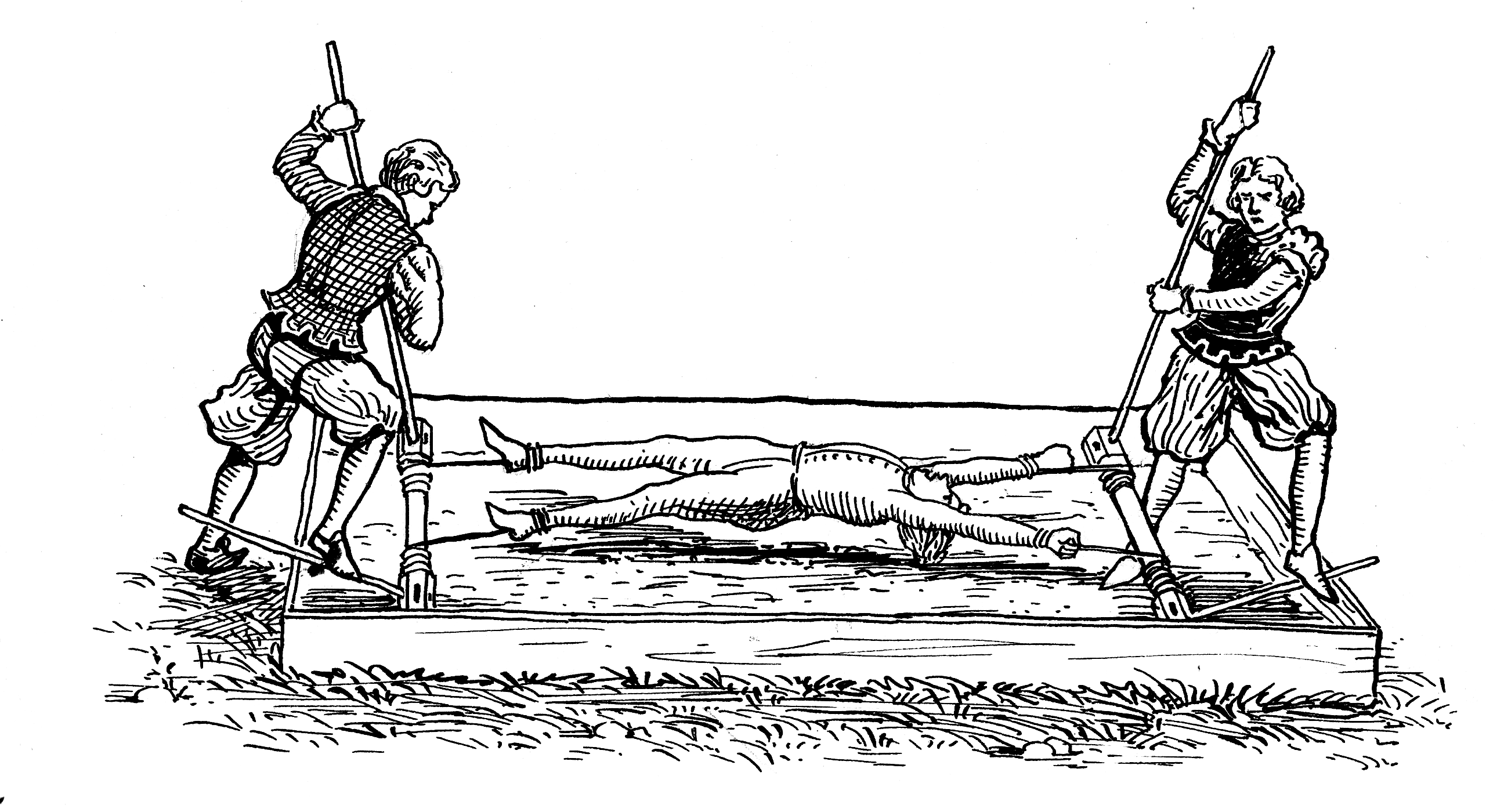
Torture Rack

In England, torture was never part of the Common Law system, but the Crown could still issue warrants of torture for specific cases (to acquire information rather than extract confession). The letter of the law was not always adhered to, for example the confession of Marc Smeaton at the trial of Anne Boleyn was presented in written form only, possibly to hide from the court that Smeaton had been tortured on the rack for four hours. The Crown continued to issue warrants for torture into the 17th century. When Guy Fawkes was arrested for his role in the Gunpowder Plot of 1605, King James I issued such a warrant and Fawkes was tortured to extract from him the names of his fellow conspirators. In the period 1540 to 1640 warrants were issued at an average rate of about one per year, with the last one being issued by Charles I in 1640. The last exception was peine forte et dure, which could be used on someone who refused to plead guilty or not guilty, which was abolished in 1772. Torture was prohibited in Scotland in 1708 after the Acts of Union 1707. These prohibitions applied only in Britain, not in territories of the British Empire unless explicitly introduced there.

The use of torture in Europe became highly criticized during the Enlightenment. Cesare Beccaria's On Crimes and Punishments (1764) denounced the use of torture as cruel and contrary to reason. The French Revolution abolished the use of torture in France and the French Armies carried abolition to most of the rest of Europe. The last European jurisdictions to abolish legal torture were Portugal (1828) and the canton of Glarus in Switzerland (1851).

Under codified legal systems such as France, torture was superseded with a legal system that is highly dependent on investigating magistrates and the confession remains "The Queen of Proofs". As a result, such magistrates are often under pressure to produce results. It is alleged that in many cases police violence towards suspects has been ignored by the magistrates. In the adversarial system of common law used throughout the English-speaking world, the experience is a different one. As the two parties have to convince a jury whether the defendant in a case is guilty or innocent of a crime, if the defence can persuade a jury that reasonable doubt exists over the credibility of a confession, then the jury is likely to disregard the confession. If the defence can show that the confession was made under such duress that most people would make such a confession, then the jury is likely to question the confession's credibility. Usually the more duress that can be shown to have been used by law enforcement by the defence, the less weight most juries will place on confessions. In Britain, partly to protect the individual against police brutality and partly to make confessions credible to a jury, all interviews with a suspect are audio taped on a machine which make two simultaneous copies, one for the police and one for the defendant. In Northern Ireland, where society is more polarised than in the rest of the United Kingdom, which means that allegations of police brutality are perceived by sections of the community to carry more credence, interviews are video taped.

It has been alleged that in certain circumstances torture, even though it is illegal, may have been used by some European countries. In "anti-terrorist" campaigns where information is needed for intelligence purposes, and not to obtain a confession for use in court, there is a temptation by the security forces, whether authorised by governments or not, to extract intelligence from alleged terrorists using any means available including the use of torture. Where there is a time component to a crime, for example in a kidnapping case, there is also a temptation for the police to try to extract information by methods which would make the evidence inadmissible in court.

Israel has been accused of using torture against Palestinians as early as 1967, and by 1987 torture was generally considered to be permissible under the law. However, there were limitations to who could be tortured. The party being tortured had to be considered guilty, and it had to be for good reason in order to be tolerated. In 1999, the Supreme Court of Israel ruled that torture was unlawful and that prohibitions against torture were "absolute". Despite this ruling, there are claims that many innocent Palestinians still face torture tactics from Israeli authorities, revealing the difficulty of stopping torture in practice, even after it is no longer considered legal.

== Debate ==
=== Proponents ===
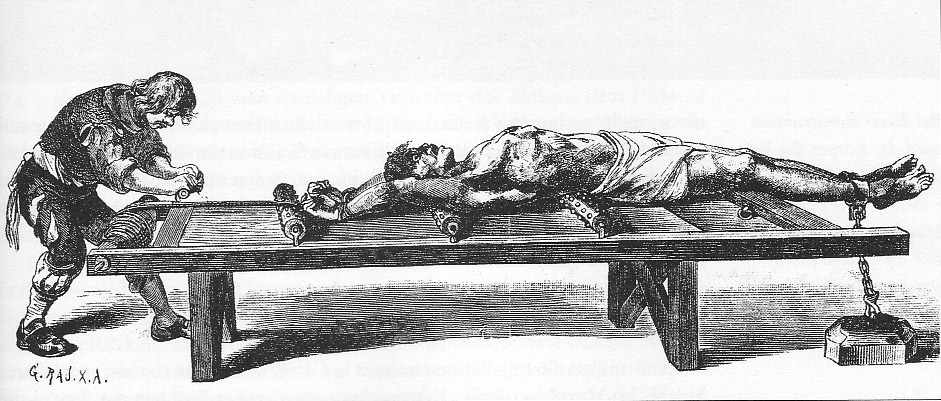
Stretch Bed

Some scholars have argued that the need for information outweighs the moral and ethical arguments against torture.

Yasmin Alibhai-Brown, in an opinion article published in The Independent on 23 May 2005, wrote:

The Harvard law professor Alan Dershowitz argues that in extreme situations, in order to prevent a tragedy, a "torture warrant" should be issued by U.S. courts to use hot needles under the nails, for example. This would make the use open to security, even though it would be against the Geneva conventions [and other international treaties]. This utilitarian position is both contemptible and persuasive ...

Two academics at Deakin University in Victoria, Australia, Professor Mirko Bagaric, a Croatian-born Australian based author and lawyer, who is the head of Deakin University's Law School, and a fellow Deakin law lecturer, Julie Clarke, published a paper in the University of San Francisco Law Review arguing that when many lives are in imminent danger, "all forms of harm" may be inflicted on a suspect, even if this might result in "annihilation". The reasoning behind the proposal to legalise torture is that:

as a society we would accept that one person being killed to save thousands is legitimate. ... Of course, it is far more repugnant to inflict harm on an innocent person than a wrongdoer ... But in some extreme cases, where it is almost certain someone has information that could prevent many lives being lost and there is no other way to obtain that information, the mere fact that they're not directly involved in creating that threat doesn't mean they can wash their hands of responsibility.

When reviewing Alan Dershowitz's book Why Terrorism Works: Understanding the Threat, Responding to the Challenge, Richard Posner, a judge of the United States Court of Appeals for the Seventh Circuit, wrote:

If torture is the only means of obtaining the information necessary to prevent the detonation of a nuclear bomb in Times Square, torture should be used – and will be used – to obtain the information. ... no one who doubts that this is the case should be in a position of responsibility.

— Richard Posner, The New Republic, September 2002

On 20 December 2005, Albert Mohler, president of the Southern Baptist Theological Seminary, addressed the problem of whether torture should be used by American military forces in order to gain important information from terrorist suspects. Although he spoke out against any form of legal codification, he did state the following:

Under certain circumstances, most morally sensitive persons would surely allow interrogators to yell at prisoners and to use psychological intimidation, sleep deprivation, and the removal of creature comforts for purposes of obtaining vital information. In increasingly serious cases, most would likely allow some use of pharmaceuticals and more intensive and manipulative psychological techniques. In the most extreme of conceivable cases, most would also allow the use of far more serious mechanisms of coercion – even what we would all agree should be labeled as torture. ... I would argue that we cannot condone torture by codifying a list of exceptional situations in which techniques of torture might be legitimately used. At the same time, I would also argue that we cannot deny that there could exist circumstances in which such uses of torture might be made necessary.

=== Opponents ===
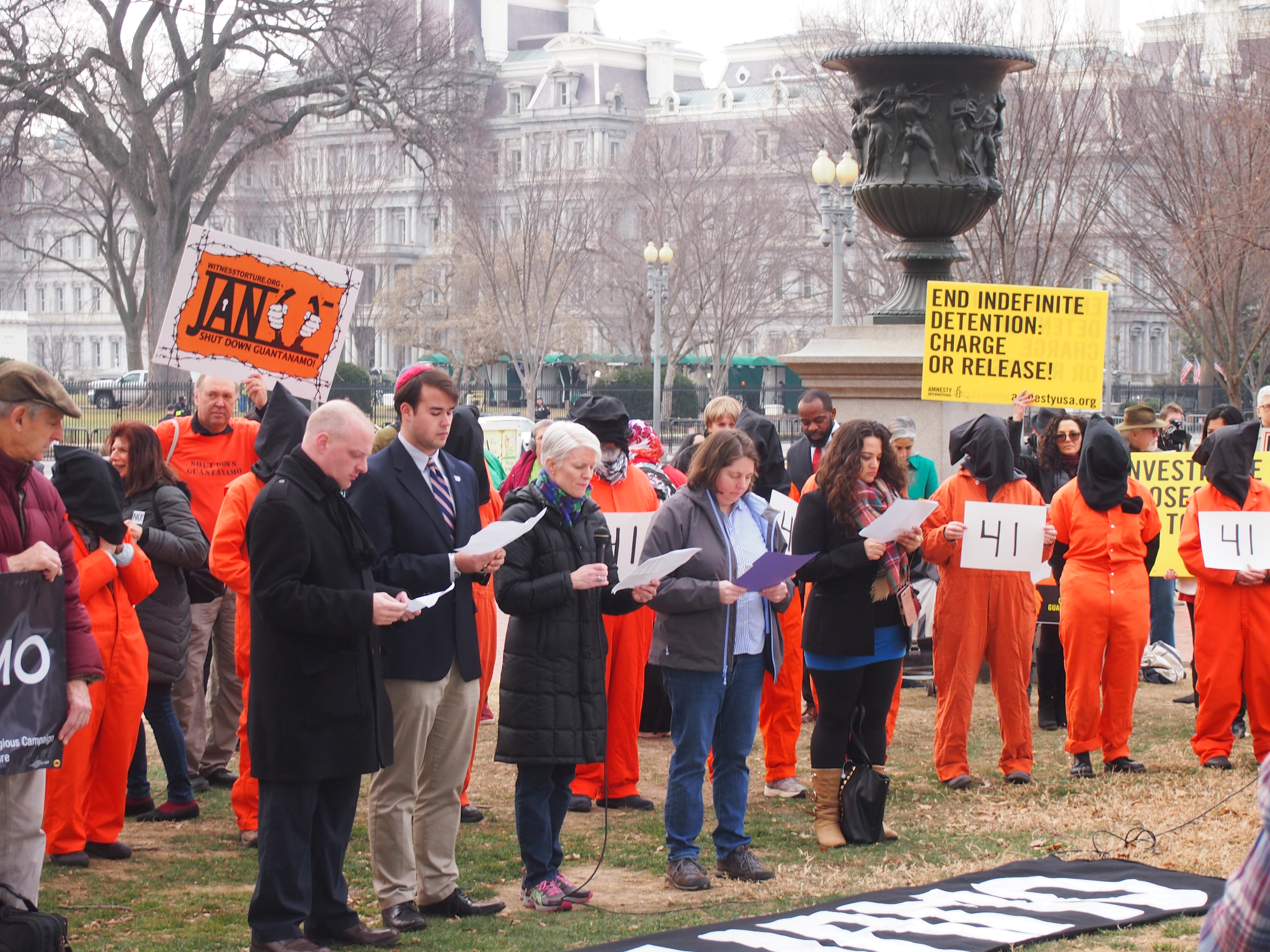
Rally to Close Guantanamo and Stop Torture (2018)

In most countries, torture is illegal, and because of this, torture is outside the normal framework for establishing guilt or innocence. It is nearly impossible to know for sure whether a detainee actually knows information that is desirable, or even if they were involved in whatever crime is being investigated in the first place. As a result of this, an abnormally large proportion of torture victims are either innocent (apart from membership of target communities), or of mistaken identity. For example, Khalid el-Masri, an innocent German citizen, was kidnapped and tortured, having been mistaken for Al-Qaida chief Khalid al-Masri. The Red Cross in Iraq estimated that 80% of detainees at Abu Ghraib were the "wrong people".

In response to the article by Professor Bagaric and Mrs Clarke, Amnesty International spokeswoman Nicole Bieske, who is also a lawyer, was stunned by the idea of regulating torture: "It's astonishing and appalling that somebody would hold this opinion in relation to such a fundamental issue as torture, and to be justifying it on moral as well as pragmatic grounds". Professor Bagaric and Mrs Clarke submitted the paper to an American law journal because of "the kind of emotive comments that I've had here in Australia, saying that this view is horrendous, unthinking, and irresponsible".

Joe Navarro, one of the F.B.I.’s top experts in questioning techniques, told The New Yorker, "Only a psychopath can torture and be unaffected. You don't want people like that in your organization. They are untrustworthy, and tend to have grotesque other problems".

Toleration of torture and arbitrary detention has been likened to a "cancer of democracy" in a book of the same title by Pierre Vidal-Naquet, which begins to undermine all other aspects of a state's legitimacy. On the 20th anniversary of the coming into force of the United Nations Convention against Torture, Philip Hensher writes, "Civilization is at once compromised if, in defense of other freedoms, it decides to regress, to accept the possibility of torture as it is seen in the movies".

== Ticking time bomb scenario ==
In law enforcement, one perceived argument is in favor of the use of force to extract information from a suspect, which is only necessary when regular interrogation yields no results and time is of the essence. This can be seen in the most frequently cited theoretical example, the "ticking time bomb" scenario, where a known terrorist has planted a nuclear bomb. In such circumstances, it has been argued both in favor of and in opposition to torture. Some argue that not to use torture would be wrong, while others argue that using torture in any capacity would negatively impact society in a way that would be worse than the consequences of not using torture.

The obvious rebuttal to this stance is that no such scenario has ever existed. In other words, it is just a theoretical idea, because no real life scenario has happened that is comparable. In addition, any situations even remotely resembling such a case were resolved without the need to torture any suspect. This further gives reason to deontological theorists that torture is not necessary under any circumstances. Even if torture was justified for some reason, it can be asked whether torture would be limited to suspects, or whether one could torture the family and friends of this detainee to make him compliant. The question of where the line is drawn regarding who can be tortured and who cannot remains unanswered in this context.

Supporters cite cases where torture has worked: In the case of Magnus Gäfgen, who was suspected of kidnapping 11-year-old Jakob von Metzler and arrested in October 2002 by German police, police surveillance had observed Gäfgen pick up a €1 million ransom demanded from the von Metzler family and proceed to go on a spending spree. After the ransom was paid, the boy was not released. Fearing for the boy's safety, Frankfurt's deputy police chief Wolfgang Daschner had Gäfgen arrested, and when he would not talk, threatened to cause Gäfgen severe pain. Gäfgen told police where he had hidden von Metzler's body. In this case torture was threatened, but not used, to extract information that, in other circumstances, could have saved a boy's life. The ethical question is whether this can ever be justified. Wolfgang Daschner felt that in the circumstances it was justified. German Chancellor Merkel, in an interview on 9 January 2006, in reference to the Metzler case, stated that "The public debate showed that the overwhelming majority of citizens believed that even in such a case, the end does not justify the means. That is also my position."

On the other hand, one argument against torture is that it fails to elicit the expected information because when the subject is in that high pressure situation, they may be saying anything they believe that the interrogators may want to hear in order to keep themself out of danger. The subject being interrogated may also deliberately lie in order to waste the interrogators' time and make it more likely for the bomb to go off. One last possibility is that the detainee is innocent, and no amount of torture or threats of violence will yield the information that the interrogators are searching for. By adopting a "the ends justifies the means" approach, this would allow nine innocent people to be tortured as long as the tenth offered a full confession. A utilitarian would agree that the ends justify the means in that situation, while a deontologist would argue that those innocent lives should not be involved, and that a person should not be treated as a mere means to an end.

It has been estimated that as few as two dozen of the 600 detainees at Guantanamo had any potential intelligence value, even if it could be obtained from them. This is another situation that deontologists could use to show the ineffectiveness of torture when attempted in real life. There is no way to prove that the detainee(s) have or know of any information that may be relevant, and no amount of torture can make them respond in the way the interrogators are hoping for them to respond.

== See also ==
- Black site
- Command responsibility
- Murder of Jakob von Metzler
- Program for Torture Victims
- Religious views on torture
- Torture in international law
- United Nations Convention against Torture
- Use of torture since 1948
- World Organisation Against Torture
