= Diana Kordon =

Argentine psychologist and human rights activist

- Occupations: Psychologist; psychiatrist; human rights activist
- Employer(s): Argentine Association of Group Psychology and Psychotherapy
- Spouse: Dario Lagos
- Awards: Guggenheim Fellowship (2004); Inge Genefke Award (2006); University of Oslo's Human Rights Award (2016)

Diana Ruth Kordon is an Argentine psychologist, psychiatrist, and human rights activist. She and her husband Dario Lagos co-founded the Argentine Team of Psychological Work and Research, and was awarded the 2006 Inge Genefke Award and 2016 University of Oslo's Human Rights Award. A 2004 Guggenheim Fellow, she has also co-authored several books and worked as a professor for several universities.

== Biography ==
Diana Kordon and her husband Dario Lagos became involved in providing support for torture victims during the Dirty War. Her first psychiatry work involved providing support for the Mothers of Plaza de Mayo, serving as coordinator of their psychological assistance team from 1979 to 1990. Kordon later recalled that political commitment was the main priority for her work with the group. In 1985, the couple were among the co-founders of International Rehabilitation Council for Torture Victims. In 1990, the two co-founded the Argentine Team of Psychological Work and Research (EATIP), for which she became coordinator that year.

Kordon served as full professor at the Argentine Association of Group Psychology and Psychotherapy (AAPPG)'s postgraduate training institute from 1988 to 2014, and at a AAPPG-Faculty of Psychology-National University of Mar del Plata (UNMdP) psychology-and-psychoanalysis of relationships program from 2004 to 2009. She has also served as a professor at UNMdP, as well as the University of Buenos Aires and the National University of La Plata.

In 2004, she and Lucila Edelman were awarded a Guggenheim Fellowship "for a study of multigenerational psychological effects of dictatorial repression". In 2006, Kordon and Lagos were awarded the Inge Genefke Award. In 2016, she was awarded the University of Oslo's Human Rights Award and the 2016 Barbara Chester Award. Fellow anti-torture activist Bent Sørensen credited her with promoting international support for the Mothers. The University of Oslo called her "a pioneer in developing psychological help for victims of human rights violations". In an interview with FM De La Calle, Kordon said on the importance of memory in regards to Argentine history: "It’s not a problem of forgetting, it’s a problem of how you interpret history".

Kordon has co-authored several books, including Efectos psicológicos de la represión política (1986), Temas grupales por autores argentinos (1988), La impunidad, una perspectiva psicosocial y clínica (1995), Desarrollos sobre grupalidad, una perspectiva psicoanalítica (1995), Paisajes del dolor, senderos de esperanza (2002); Por-venires de la memoria (2007), Sur Dictadura y Después… (2010), Trabajando en y con Grupos (2011), and Vínculos en crisis (2018). She has written chapters for edited volumes such as Torture and its Consequences (1992), Caring for Victims of Torture (1998), and International Handbook of Multigenerational Legacies (1998).

Kordon is a full member of the AAPPG. She is also an honorary member of the Association of Argentine Psychiatrists, where she is honorary president of the Association of Argentine Psychiatrists' group and community approaches chapter.

== Books ==
- Efectos psicológicos de la represión política (1986)
- Temas grupales por autores argentinos (1988)
- La impunidad, una perspectiva psicosocial y clínica (1995)
- Desarrollos sobre grupalidad, una perspectiva psicoanalítica (1995)
- Paisajes del dolor, senderos de esperanza (2002)
- Por-venires de la memoria (2007)
- Sur Dictadura y Después… (2010)
- Trabajando en y con Grupos (2011)
- (with Carlos Pachuk and Lucila Edelman) Vínculos en crisis (2018)
