= Ticking time bomb scenario =

Hypothetical scenario debating the justifications of torture

The ticking time bomb scenario is a thought experiment that has been used in the ethics debate over whether interrogational torture can ever be justified. The scenario can be formulated as follows:

Suppose that a person with knowledge of an imminent terrorist attack that will kill many people is in the hands of the authorities, and he will disclose the information needed to prevent the attack only if he is tortured. Should he be tortured?

It is usually planted as the assumption of a ticking time bomb that still has not exploded but will happen in a short period of time. If the terrorist who placed it is detained and is forced through torture to tell where he placed it, the bomb could be deactivated, thus saving many lives.

Some consequentialists argue that nations, even those that legally disallow torture, can justify its use if they have a terrorist in custody who possesses critical knowledge, such as the location of a time bomb or a weapon of mass destruction that will soon detonate and kill many people.

Opponents to the argument usually begin by exposing certain assumptions that tend to be hidden by initial presentations of the scenario and tend to obscure the true costs of permitting torture in "real-life" scenarios—e.g., the assumption that the person is in fact a terrorist, whereas in real life there usually remains uncertainty about whether the person is in fact a terrorist and if they have useful information—and rely on legal, philosophical/moral, and empirical grounds to reaffirm the need for the absolute prohibition of torture. There is also uncertainty about the efficacy of interrogational torture, and much opposition to torture is based on the fact it is not effective rather than any moral issue, as well as how the decision to apply (or even allow) torture, whether or not an official process exists for doing so, might figure in the game theoretical payoff matrix of the hypothetical terrorist, or the problem framers.

The ticking time bomb scenario is extremely rare in real life, but it is often cited as a reason for using torture.

== Background ==
Philosopher Jeremy Bentham has been regarded as the "father" of the ticking time bomb argument. He wrote in his 1804 essay Means of extraction for extraordinary occasions:

Suppose an occasion to arise, in which a suspicion is entertained, as strong as that which would be received as a sufficient ground for arrest and commitment as for felony – a suspicion that at this very time a considerable number of individuals are actually suffering, by illegal violence inflictions equal in intensity to those which if inflicted by the hand of justice, would universally be spoken of under the name of torture. For the purpose of rescuing from torture these hundred innocents, should any scruple be made of applying equal or superior torture, to extract the requisite information from the mouth of one criminal, who having it in his power to make known the place where at this time the enormity was practicing or about to be practiced, should refuse to do so?

The concept was popularized in the 1960s in the novel Les Centurions by Jean Lartéguy which is set during the Algerian war. The version in the novel has the following conditions:

1. The evidence in support of the contention that he has the relevant information would satisfy the requirements of evidence for convicting him of an offence.
2. There are reasonable grounds for believing that he is likely to tell the truth if severe torture is threatened, and, if necessary, applied to him.
3. There are reasonable grounds for believing that no other means would have the effect of compelling him to tell the truth.
4. There are grounds for believing that if the information is obtained quickly, there is a good chance of defusing the bomb before it goes off.
5. There are reasonable grounds for believing that the likely damage to be caused by the bomb will include death of many citizens, the maiming of others, including the infliction of much more severe pain on others with much more lasting effect than will be the effect of the infliction of torture on the person who has been captured;
6. There are reasonable grounds for believing that the torturing will not have consequences which would be worse than the damage likely to result from the bomb going off.

In the novel, the hardened terrorist quickly folds under torture and reveals the location of the bombs. According to Darius Rejali, a professor of political science at Reed College, the possibility of sudden, massive destruction of innocent life provided French liberals with a more acceptable justification for committing torture.

== Views in favor of accepting torture in emergencies ==
After the September 11 attacks, Alan Dershowitz, a prominent American defense attorney, surprised some observers by giving limited support to the idea that torture could be justified. He argued that human nature can lead to unregulated abuse "off the books". Therefore, it would be better if there were a regulated procedure through which an interrogator could request a "torture warrant" and that requiring a warrant would establish a paper trail of accountability. Torturers, and those who authorize torture, could be held to account for excesses. Dershowitz's suggested torture warrants, similar to search warrants, arrest warrants and phone tap warrants, would spell out the limits on the techniques that interrogators may use, and the extent to which they may abridge a suspect's rights.

In September 2002, when reviewing Alan Dershowitz's book, Why Terrorism Works: Understanding the Threat, Responding to the Challenge, Richard Posner, legal scholar and judge of the United States Court of Appeals for the Seventh Circuit, wrote in The New Republic, "If torture is the only means of obtaining the information necessary to prevent the detonation of a nuclear bomb in Times Square, torture should be used – and will be used – to obtain the information.... No one who doubts that this is the case should be in a position of responsibility."

== Views rejecting torture under all circumstances ==
Some human rights organizations, professional and academic experts, and military and intelligence leaders have absolutely rejected the idea that torture is ever legal or acceptable, even in a so-called ticking bomb situation. They have expressed grave concern about the way the dramatic force and artificially simple moral answers the ticking bomb thought-experiment seems to offer, have manipulated and distorted the legal and moral perceptions, reasoning and judgment of both the general population and military and law enforcement officials. They reject the proposition, implicit or explicit, that certain acts of torture are justifiable, even desirable. They believe that simplistic responses to the scenario may lead well-intentioned societies down a slippery slope to legalized and systematic torture. They point out that no evidence of any real-life situation meeting all the criteria to constitute a pure ticking bomb scenario has ever been presented to the public, and that such a situation is highly unlikely. (Note: Interviewed on Face the Nation in May 2009, former Vice President Dick Cheney cited CIA memos that gave two examples supporting the use of enhanced interrogation techniques in a ticking bomb scenario, claiming that the interrogation of Abu Zubaydah prevented a plot to detonate a dirty bomb in Washington, D.C. and similarly that information forced from Khalid Sheikh Mohammed prevented an attack on Los Angeles. These claims were later repeated in August 2009 during a FOX news interview and are still cited as valid examples. However, in 2008, the claims made in the 2007 CIA memos were investigated by the Department of Justice's Office of Professional Responsibility and heavily criticized. The Department of Justice report, released in February 2009, stated that Zubaydah had supplied the information before he was tortured and that no further credible information had been obtained from the torture itself. In the case of Mohammed, the attack on Los Angeles had already been exposed before his capture and his admissions under torture were little more than white noise given to end it.)

As well, torture can be criticized as a poor vehicle for discovering truth, as people experiencing torture, once broken, are liable to make anything up in order to stop the pain and can become unable to tell the difference between fact and fiction under intense psychological pressure. Additionally, since the terrorist presumably knows that the timer is ticking, he has an excellent reason to lie and give false information under torture in order to misdirect his interrogators; merely giving a convincing answer which the investigators will waste time checking out makes it more likely that the bomb will go off, and of course once the bomb has gone off, not only has the terrorist won, but there is also no further point in torturing him, except perhaps as revenge.

Others point out that the ticking-bomb torture proponents adopt an extremely short-term view, which impoverishes their consequentialism. Using torture - or even declaring that one is prepared to accept its use - makes other groups of people much more likely to use torture themselves in the long run. The consequence is likely to be a long-term increase in violence. This long-term effect is so serious that the person making the torture decision cannot possibly (according to this argument) make a reasonable estimate of its results. Thus the decision-maker has no grounds for certainty that the value of the lives saved from the ticking bomb will outweigh the value of the lives lost because of the subsequent disorder. He or she cannot arrive at a successful accounting of consequences.

This anti-torture argument, in fact, works by positing that human knowledge has intrinsic limits. An analogous argument holds that human decision-makers are fundamentally prone in certain situations to believe that their judgment is better than it is, and that, to be ethical, they must pre-commit themselves to a particular course of action in those situations. Knowing that, under stress, they will never be able to accurately assess the likely success of torture in obtaining information needed to prevent an attack, humans thus pre-commit to not torture. In general, this family of arguments faults the "ticking-bomb" scenario for implicitly including an incorrect presumption that the decision-maker can know in advance the outcome of torture, either in the short run (likelihood that it will prevent an attack) or the long run (likelihood that it will not set off a general increase in human violence).

Joe Navarro, one of the FBI's top experts in questioning techniques, told The New Yorker:

Only a psychopath can torture and be unaffected. You don't want people like that in your organization. They are untrustworthy, and tend to have grotesque other problems.

The United Nations Convention against Torture and Other Cruel, Inhuman or Degrading Treatment or Punishment, which was adopted on December 10, 1984, and entered into force on June 26, 1987, explicitly states in Article 2.2 that:

No exceptional circumstances whatsoever, whether a state of war or a threat of war, internal political instability or any other public emergency, may be invoked as a justification of torture.

=== Implausibility ===
Critics of the thought experiment scenario maintain that it is essentially implausible, based on simultaneous presence of numerous unlikely factors. This is particularly acute in fictional exploration of the scenario.

For example, in perhaps the most common variants on the scenario, one must assume that torturers know, with a reasonable degree of certainty that some form of deadly attack is imminent, but lack a crucial component of that plan, such as its precise location. They must also have in their custody someone who they are reasonably certain has said information and would talk under torture or threat of torture. They must then be able to accurately distinguish between true and false information which the subject may supply under torture. They must then be able to use this information to form a plan of response which is effective at stopping the planned attack. All of this must occur within a limited time frame allowed by the "ticking bomb".

No less importantly, there exists no historical case that satisfies all or even most of the conditions for a ticking time bomb.

== Effect of fiction ==
Works of fiction, such as the television series 24, often rely on ticking time bomb scenarios for dramatic effect. According to the Parents Television Council, given that each season represents a 24-hour period, Jack Bauer encounters someone who needs torturing to reveal a ticking bomb on average 12 times per day.

Michael Chertoff, the Secretary of Homeland Security under the George W. Bush administration, declared that 24 "reflects real life." John Yoo, the former Justice Department lawyer who produced the torture memos cited Bauer in support, while Supreme Court Justice Antonin Scalia went further, arguing "Jack Bauer saved Los Angeles... He saved hundreds of thousands of lives. Are you going to convict Jack Bauer?". In contrast, one of the show's creators has stated:

Most terrorism experts will tell you that the ‘ticking time bomb’ situation never occurs in real life, or very rarely. But on our show it happens every week.

The show uses the same techniques that are used by the U.S. against terrorist suspects during the war on terror. U.S. Army Brigadier General Patrick Finnegan, the dean of the United States Military Academy at West Point, and others, objected to the central theme of the show—that the letter of American law must be sacrificed for the country’s security—as it had an adverse effect on the training of actual American soldiers by advocating unethical and illegal behavior. As Finnegan said:

The kids see it, and say, 'If torture is wrong, what about "24"?'

He continued,

The disturbing thing is that although torture may cause Jack Bauer some angst, it is always the patriotic thing to do.

The "ticking time bomb scenario" is subject of the drama The Dershowitz Protocol by Canadian author Robert Fothergill. In that play, the American government has established a protocol of "intensified interrogation" for terrorist suspects which requires participation of the FBI, CIA and the Department of Justice. The drama deals with the psychological pressure and the tense triangle of competences under the overriding importance that each participant has to negotiate the actions with his conscience.

== See also ==
- Ethics of torture
- Murder of Jakob von Metzler
- Slippery slope#Domino fallacy
- False dilemma
- Principle of double effect
- Psychology of torture
- Trolley problem

=== In fiction ===
- Dirty Harry
- The Siege
- 24
- Unthinkable
- Call of Duty: Black Ops
- The 100
- American Dad
