= Jürgen Schreiber (journalist) =

German journalist (1947–2022)

- Born: 30 January 1947; Heilbronn, Allied-occupied Germany
- Died: 21 February 2022 (aged 75)
- Occupations: Journalist, author

Jürgen Schreiber (30 January 1947 – 21 February 2022) was a German investigative journalist and author based in Berlin. He was a regular contributor to Berlin's daily newspaper Der Tagesspiegel on matters concerning Germany's past in World War II and in the fine arts. Schreiber's (non-official) biography in 2005 of the German painter Gerhard Richter, gained much recognition when he exposed the fact that Richter's own aunt was murdered by Richter's late father-in-law, a doctor in the SS.

== Life and career ==
Schreiber was born in Heilbronn, Allied-occupied Germany, on 30 January 1947. For over 30 years Jürgen Schreiber worked as journalist and as a reporter. During this time he mainly worked for the West German newspapers Stuttgarter Zeitung and Frankfurter Rundschau. He has also written for the German magazines GEO, Sports and Merian and Zeit-Magazin. He was also on the initial staff of the weekly paper Die Woche. He was temporarily with the magazine of South Germany's biggest newspaper, Munich's Süddeutsche Zeitung.

From 1999, he worked for Berlin's biggest daily Der Tagesspiegel and from 2001, served as its chief reporter. In connection with the case against child murderer Magnus Gäfgen he uncovered the use of torture against the accused of murder. Twice he was honoured with the Wächterpreis of the German press (an award for whistleblower reporting). In 1992 he received, in addition to that, the very highly regarded de:Theodor-Wolff-Preis. In 2005, Schreiber published his first book Ein Maler in Deutschland (A Painter from Germany) which uncovered the family drama of the most well-known German painter of the time, Gerhard Richter. Schreiber revealed the fact that Richter, in his famous portrait, Aunt Marianne painted his aunt (de:Marianne Schönfelder) together with the painter as a baby in front, and that the aunt had later been killed in Adolf Hitler's euthanasia programme by physicians, among the practitioners of which was Richter's own later father-in-law and physician (Obersturmbannführer de:Heinrich Eufinger). This happened without Richter's knowledge.

Schreiber died on 21 February 2022, at the age of 75.

== Works ==
- Ein Maler aus Deutschland. Gerhard Richter – Das Drama einer Familie. Pendo Verlag, Munich/Zürich 2005. ISBN 3-86612-058-3
- Meine Jahre mit Joschka. Nachrichten von fetten und mageren Zeiten, Econ, Berlin 2007, ISBN 3-430-30033-9
- Sie starb wie Che Guevara. Die Geschichte der Monika Ertl. Artemis & Winkler, Düsseldorf 2009 ISBN 978-3-538-07274-9
- Die Stasi lebt: Berichte aus einem unterwanderten Land. Droemer/Knaur, Munich 2009 ISBN 3426782510

None of Schreiber's works has yet been translated into English, though his biography of Monika Ertl has been published in Italian as La ragazza che vendicò Che Guevara. Storia di Monika Ertl 2011
