= José Quiroga (cardiologist) =

Chilean physician

José Quiroga Fuentealba is a cardiologist who served as a physician to Chilean president Salvador Allende. During the 1973 Chilean coup d'état, Quiroga witnessed the Chilean Army assault the government palace. He was detained and beaten until his release was ordered by a Chilean military general.

== Career ==
In 1977, Quiroga secured a position at UCLA Fielding School of Public Health and moved his family to Santa Monica, California. He volunteered to treat torture victims at UCLA and the Venice Family Clinic for the next twenty-five years. In 1980, Quiroga co-founded the Program for Torture Victims with Argentine refugee psychologist Ana Deutsch. He has spoken about his work at conferences and universities worldwide.

Quiroga was the former vice president and member of the executive committee of the International Rehabilitation Council for Torture Victims (IRCT) in Copenhagen. He also serves as treasurer of Physicians for Social Responsibility and was a former medical director of the Program for Torture Victims. He received the 2009 Socially Responsible Medicine Award from Physicians for Social Responsibility in recognition of his professional career and social commitment. Quiroga was awarded the Inge Genefke Award in 2012 alongside his peer Jim Jaranson. The award is given every other year by the Anti-Torture Support Foundation to honor outstanding work in the global fight against torture. The official award ceremony took place in November 2012 at the board meeting of the International Rehabilitation Council for Torture Victims.

For his work on the human rights of refugees, Quiroga has received press coverage from the Los Angeles Times Magazine the New South Wales Service for the Treatment and Rehabilitation of Torture and Trauma Survivors' Refugee Transitions. In an interview with the Hungarian journal Élet és Irodalom, he further commented on his founding of the Program for Torture Victims and how its relationships with the IRCT drew closer following the Balkan Wars.

== The Hoover Institution Interview ==
On June 30–31, 2007, Brad Bauer, associate archivist for collection development at the Hoover Institution Archives of Stanford University, conducted a 6.75-hour interview with José Quiroga. The interview, in six segments, covers subjects such as Quiroga's biography (starting in early 20th-century Chile), his role in Salvador Allende's government and having witnessed Allende's last hours in La Moneda, and his long-term work to document and treat victims of torture from Chile and the world.

== Publications ==
=== Author ===
- Quiroga, José (2009). "Torture in Children" (PDF). Torture. 19 (2): 66–87.

=== Co-author ===
- Quiroga, José; Gurr, Roger (2001). "Approaches to torture rehabilitation: a desk study covering effects, cost-effectiveness, participation, and sustainability" (PDF). IRCT.
- ——; Jaranson, James (2005). "Politically-motivated torture and its survivors: a desk study review of the literature" (PDF). Torture. 15 (2–3): 1–111. Archived from the original (PDF) on 2011-07-25.
- ——; Jaranson, James (2011). "Evaluating the services of torture rehabilitation programmes: history and recommendations" (PDF). Torture. 21 (2): 98–140.
- ——; Modvig, Jens (2020-12-11). "Torture methods and their health impact". Research Handbook on Torture: 410–431. doi:10.4337/9781788113960.00024. ISBN 9781788113960. S2CID 234530728.
- ——; Lira, Elizabeth (2022). “The military coup in Chile in 1973, the immediate reaction of international organisations, and the founding of the first rehabilitation program for torture victims in 1977”. Torture. 32 (1–2): 113–132.
- ——; Deutsch, Ana (2023). “Medico-Legal Evaluation of Torture Victims in the USA before the Istanbul Protocol”. Torture. 33 (2):151–56.

=== IFEG Statements ===
Officially established by the International Rehabilitation Council for Torture Victims (IRCT) in 2012, as part of its mission to be an international hub of expertise on torture investigation and documentation, the International Forensic Expert Group (IFEG) is an organisation of 42 distinguished experts from 23 countries specialised in the evaluation of torture and ill-treatment cases. The following are statements signed by Dr. Quiroga as one of those experts.

- Statement on Hooding, 2011.
- Statement on Virginity Testing, 2015
- Statement on Anal Examinations in Cases of Alleged Homosexuality, 2016
- Statement on Conversion Therapy, 2020
