= Fanny Edelman =

Argentine politician (1911–2011)

President of the Communist Party of Argentina
- In office April 15, 1970 – November 1, 2011
- Preceded by: Victorio Codovilla
- Succeeded by: Patricio Echegaray

Personal details
- Born: 27 February 1911 San Francisco, Córdoba, Argentina
- Died: 1 November 2011 (aged 100) Buenos Aires, Argentina
- Children: 2 (including Lucila)

Fanny Jabcovsky, better known as Fanny Edelman (27 February 1911 – 1 November 2011) was an Argentine politician who was part of the International Brigades in defense of the Second Spanish Republic. She was honorary president of the Communist Party of Argentina until the day of her death.

== Biography ==
Fanny Jabcovsky was born in Córdoba to an immigrant family who fled the anti-Jewish pogroms in the Russian Empire: her father Felipe came from Zgurița in Bessarabia and mother from Congress Poland. Her family moved to Buenos Aires when she was 13. She worked in the textile industry and as a music teacher.

In 1934, repelled by the electoral fraud of General José Félix Uriburu, she joined the International Red Aid (Communist party).

In 1936, she married the journalist and social activist Bernardo Edelman, and together they were mobilized by the Communist party in 1937 to engage in the Republican resistance in Valencia. This is when she adopted her husband's name and became Fanny Edelman. Bernardo was reporting for the Nueva España newspapers, while she was representing the interests of the International Red Aid like providing materials to the Communist soldiers.

After her brief time in the Spanish Civil War, she returned to Argentina in 1937. As a Communist leader, she supported all international battles led by the Party. In 1947, she worked for the creation of the Women's Union of Argentina. In 1972, she became general secretary of the Women's International Democratic Federation.

Fanny Edelman died on November 1, 2011, in Buenos Aires. She has a daughter, psychologist and human rights activist Lucila, as well as a son.

== Honours ==
- Cuba: Order of José Martí, March 2011.
