= Khaled Abou El Fadl =

Kuwaiti-American Islamic legal scholar (born 1963)

Khaled Abou el Fadl
- Born: October 23, 1963 (age 62); Kuwait City, Kuwait
- Occupations: Professor of Law, UCLA School of Law; Islamic scholar
- Spouse: Grace Song

Academic background
- Education: Yale University; Princeton University; University of Pennsylvania Law School

Academic work
- Discipline: Philosophy
- Sub-discipline: Islamic philosophy
- School or tradition: Islamic Modernism, Liberalism and progressivism within Islam
- Notable works: The Search for Beauty in Islam: Conference of the Books (2001)

Khaled Abou el Fadl (Arabic: خالد أبو الفضل, IPA: [ˈxæːled abolˈfɑdl]) (born October 23, 1963) is a Kuwaiti-American Islamic scholar and jurist, Omar and Azmeralda Alfi Distinguished Professor of Law at the UCLA School of Law where he has taught courses on International Human Rights, Islamic jurisprudence, National Security Law, Law and Terrorism, Islam and Human Rights, Political Asylum, and Political Crimes and Legal Systems. He is also the founder of the Usuli Institute, a non-profit public charity dedicated to research and education to promote humanistic interpretations of Islam, as well as the Chair of the Islamic Studies Program at the University of California, Los Angeles. He has lectured on and taught Islamic law in the United States and Europe in academic and non-academic environments since around 1990. In January 2021, Dr. Khaled Abou El Fadl and his wife, Grace Song, relocated to Dublin, Ohio, where they established the Usuli Institute's new home and library.

Abou El Fadl is the author of numerous books and scholarly articles on topics in human rights law, Islam, and Islamic law. He has appeared on national and international television and radio, and written in publications such as The New York Times, The Washington Post, The Wall Street Journal, The Los Angeles Times, and The Boston Review. His work has been translated into several languages including Arabic, Persian, Indonesian, French, Norwegian, Dutch, Russian, Vietnamese and Japanese.

Abou El Fadl is the subject of the 2026 documentary I'd Rather Be Dead Than Silent.

== Education ==
Abou El Fadl holds a B.A. in Political Science from Yale University, a J.D. from the University of Pennsylvania Law School, and an M.A. and Ph.D. in Islamic law from Princeton University. Abou El Fadl also has 13 years of instruction in Islamic jurisprudence, grammar and rhetoric in Egypt and Kuwait. After law school, he clerked for Arizona Supreme Court Justice James Moeller, and practiced immigration and investment law in the U.S. and the Middle East. He previously taught Islamic law at the University of Texas School of Law at Austin, Yale Law School and Princeton University.

== Views ==
Abou El Fadl argues that covering the hair is not mandatory for women in Islam.

Abou El Fadl believes that the usuli tradition "naturally leads Islam" to an ethical humanism, or a set of ideas about justice and beauty that help to achieve God's will. He has criticized puritanical and Wahhabi Islam for, among other things, its lack of interest in morality, which the Wahhabis argue "shouldn't affect the implementation of Koranic law." He has strongly criticised the Saudi Arabian government and has accused them of systematic torture, murder, and failing to either understand or properly implement Islamic teachings.

Abou El Fadl has described the terrorism of September 11 attacks as the logical conclusion of "a puritanical and ethically oblivious form of Islam [that] has predominated since the 1970s" and been promoted by religious authorities in Saudi Arabia and other countries, including the U.S. and Europe. He supports religious and cultural pluralism, democratic values and women's rights. He is known for his scholarly critique of terrorism and Wahhabi extremism.

He would like to return to the "Golden Age of Islam" where "numerous traditions" emphasized that the "pursuit of knowledge is an act of permanent worship" and to abandon the current state of affairs where "rampant apologetics" of Muslim thinkers has "produced a culture that eschews self-critical and introspective insight and embraces projection of blame and a fantasy-like level of confidence and arrogance." He has criticised a "culture of ugliness in modern Islam". He is a vocal supporter of the causes of Palestinians.

== Controversies ==
In 2006, Abou El Fadl was targeted in an attempted assassination. In 2016, Abou El Fadl, a U.S. citizen, was detained by U.S. border officials at the American-Canadian border Reflecting on the experience, he wrote, “ Why was I processed as if I was a visa holder instead of a citizen? Why was I searched as if my very skin could be a public threat? Why was I left to speculate instead of simply being informed of what was going on and given the opportunity to address the government’s concerns? It seems clear to me that despite my background and public identity — so easily accessible to the border guards — I was profiled.”

Despite Abou El Fadl’s opposition to Wahhabism and fundamentalism, anti-Muslim activist Daniel Pipes has criticized him for his work with The Council on American-Islamic Relations (CAIR), a Muslim civil rights organization.

== Awards and appointments ==
Abou El Fadl was awarded the University of Oslo Human Rights Award, the Leo and Lisl Eitinger Prize in 2007, and named a Carnegie Scholar in Islamic Law in 2005.

He has served on the U.S. Commission on International Religious Freedom, and Board of Directors of Human Rights Watch. He continues to serve on the Advisory Board of Middle East Watch (part of Human Rights Watch) and works with human rights organizations such as Amnesty International and the Lawyers' Committee for Human Rights (Human Rights First) in cases involving human rights, terrorism, political asylum, and international and commercial law. In 2005, he was listed as one of LawDragon's Top 500 Lawyers in the Nation. He has been listed in the Arabian Business Power 500 List of the World's Most Influential Arabs (2011, 2012).

In 2025, a collection of essays was published in honor of Abou El Fadl, titled The Promise of Sharīʿa with contributions from Sherman Jackson, Ziba Mir-Hosseini, Asma Afsaruddin, and others.

== Publications ==
Abou El Fadl’s recent works focus on authority, human rights, democracy and beauty in Islam and Islamic law.

=== Books ===
- The Palestine Sermons, (Usuli Press, 7 October 2024) ISBN 9781957063201
- The Prophet's Pulpit: Commentaries on the State of Islam, Volume III (Usuli Press, 18 May 2024) ISBN 9781957063096
- The Prophet's Pulpit: Commentaries on the State of Islam, Volume II (Usuli Press, 7 April 2023) ISBN 978-1957063065
- The Prophet's Pulpit: Commentaries on the State of Islam, Volume I (Usuli Press, 18 April 2022) ISBN 1957063025
- Reasoning with God: Reclaiming Shari'ah in the Modern Age (Rowman & Littlefield Publishers, Inc., 2014) ISBN 0742552322
- The Search for Beauty in Islam: Conference of the Books (Rowman & Littlefield Publishers, Inc., 2006) ISBN 0761819495
- The Great Theft: Wrestling Islam from the Extremists (Harper San Francisco, 2005) ISBN 0061189030
- Islam and the Challenge of Democracy (Princeton University Press, 2004) ISBN 0691119384
- The Place of Tolerance in Islam (Beacon Press, 2002) ISBN 0807002291
- And God Knows the Soldiers: The Authoritative and Authoritarian in Islamic Discourses (UPA/Rowman and Littlefield, 2001) ISBN 0761820841
- Speaking in God's Name: Islamic law, Authority and Women (Oneworld Press, Oxford, 2001) ISBN 1851682627
- Conference of the Books: The Search for Beauty in Islam (University Press of America/Rowman and Littlefield, 2001) ISBN 0761819495
- Rebellion and Violence in Islamic Law (Cambridge University Press, 2001) ISBN 0521880521
- The Authoritative and Authoritarian in Islamic Discourses (Dar Taiba, 1997) ISBN 1891226002
      - The book Rebellion and Violence in Islamic Law was translated into Persian in Iran in July 2026 by Dr. Hamid Reza Ali Qazvini, a researcher and judge of the Tehran Judiciary, and has been published by Pajouheshyar Bartar Publications.

=== Selected academic articles ===
- "The Language of the Age: Shari'a and Natural Justice in the Egyptian Revolution" in: Law in the Aftermath of the Egyptian Revolution of 25 January (Harvard International Law Journal online, April 25, 2011).
- "Fascism Triumphant?" Political Theology 10, no. 4 (2009), pp. 577–58
- "The Crusader", Boston Review 28, no. 2 (March/April 2006).
- "Speaking, Killing and Loving in God's Name", The Hedgehog Review 6, no. 1 (Spring 2004)
- "The Death Penalty, Mercy and Islam: A Call for Retrospection" in: A Call for Reckoning: Religion and the Death Penalty (eds. Erik C. Owens, John D. Carlson & Eric P. Elshtain. Grand Rapids, MI: Wm. B. Eerdmans Publishing Co., 2004, pp. 73–105).
- "The Modern Ugly and the Ugly Modern: Reclaiming the Beautiful in Islam" in: Progressive Muslims (edited by Omid Safi. Oxford: Oneworld Publications, 2003, pp. 33–77)
- "The Orphans of Modernity and the Clash of Civilisations", Global Dialogue, vol. 4, no. 2 (Spring 2002), pp. 1–16.
- "Introduction" in: Shattered Illusions: Analyzing the War on Terrorism, London: Amal Press, 2002, pp. 19–44.
- "Peaceful Jihad" in: Taking Back Islam (edited by Michael Wolfe. Emmaus, PA: Rodale Press, 2002, pp. 33–39)
- "Islam and the Challenge of Democracy", Boston Review 28, no. 2 (April/May 2003).
- "Islam and Tolerance: Abou El Fadl Replies", Boston Review 27, no. 1 (February/March 2002): pp. 51.
- "The Place of Tolerance in Islam", Boston Review 26, no. 6 (December 2001/January 2002): pp. 34–36. Translated into Arabic for publication in Al-Rashad.
- "Islam and the Theology of Power", Middle East Report 221 (Winter 2001): pp. 28–33.
- "What Became of Tolerance in Islam" in: Beauty for Ashes (Edited by John Farina. New York, NY: Crossroad Publishing Company, 2001, pp. 71–75).
