= Lucila Edelman =

Argentine psychologist and activist (born 1940)

- Born: 16 May 1940 (age 86); Buenos Aires, Argentina
- Education: University of Buenos Aires (MD)
- Occupations: Psychologist; psychiatrist; human rights activist
- Employer: Argentine Association of Group Psychology and Psychotherapy; National University of Mar del Plata
- Political party: Communist Party of Argentina; Revolutionary Communist Party
- Mother: Fanny Edelman
- Awards: Guggenheim Fellowship (2004)

Lucila Irene Edelman (born 16 May 1940) is an Argentine psychologist and human rights activist. Originally involved with the Communist Party of Argentina and the splintered Revolutionary Communist Party, she was purged from a hospital job during a government crackdown on psychiatry. she worked with the Mothers of the Plaza de Mayo before becoming part of the Argentine Team of Psychological Work and Research. A 2004 Guggenheim Fellow, she has also co-authored several books and worked as a professor for several universities.

== Biography ==
Lucila Irene Edelman was born on 16 May 1940 in Buenos Aires, daughter of Jewish Argentine parents, communist activists Bernardo and Fanny Edelman; her maternal grandparents were from Soroca (in present-day Moldova) and Odesa (in present-day Ukraine). She obtained her MD from the University of Buenos Aires (UBA) in 1965.

Originally a member of the Communist Party of Argentina, Edelman was a prominent leader within the Federation of Communist Youth before splitting with them as part of the 1968 formation of the Revolutionary Communist Party. She worked as the acting day coordinator for the Hospital Estévez until she was removed in 1970 after the Argentine government placed the National Institute of Mental Health under state administration during its crackdown on psychiatry. She was certified as a psychiatry specialist in 1980.

In 1979, Edelman joined the Mothers of the Plaza de Mayo's psychological assistance team, remaining with them until 1990. In 1990, she became a co-founding member of the Argentine Team of Psychological Work and Research (EATIP), where she was also an executive committee member.

In 1988, Edelman became a professor of theory of group analysis at the Argentine Association of Group Psychology and Psychotherapy (AAPPG). In 2003, she joined the National University of Mar del Plata (UNMdP) as a professor of psychological theory and group psychoanalysis. In 2004, she and Diana Kordon were awarded a Guggenheim Fellowship "for a study of multigenerational psychological effects of dictatorial repression". She was also a professor at a AAPPG-Faculty of Psychology-UNMdP psychology-and-psychoanalysis of relationships program from 2004 to 2009. She has also served as a professor at both UBA and the National University of La Plata.

Edelman has co-authored several books, including Efectos psicológicos de la represión política (1986), Temas grupales por autores argentinos (1988), La impunidad, una perspectiva psicosocial y clínica (1995), Desarrollos sobre grupalidad, una perspectiva psicoanalítica (1995), Paisajes del dolor, senderos de esperanza (2002), Por-venires de la memoria (2007), Sur, Dictadura y Después… (2010), and Vínculos en crisis (2018). She has written chapters for Caring for Victims of Torture (1998) and International Handbook of Multigenerational Legacies (1998).

Edelman is a full member of the AAPPG and an honorary member of the Argentine Association of Psychiatrists.

Edelman has a brother.

== Works ==
- Efectos psicológicos de la represión política (1986)
- Temas grupales por autores argentinos (1988)
- La impunidad, una perspectiva psicosocial y clínica (1995)
- Desarrollos sobre grupalidad, una perspectiva psicoanalítica (1995)
- Paisajes del dolor, senderos de esperanza (2002)
- Por-venires de la memoria (2007)
- Sur, Dictadura y Después… (2010)
- (with Carlos Pachuk and Diana Kordon) Vínculos en crisis (2018)
