= Lost Command =

1966 film by Mark Robson

- Film poster by Howard Terpning
- Directed by: Mark Robson
- Screenplay by: Nelson Gidding
- Based on: The Centurions; 1960 novel by Jean Lartéguy
- Produced by: Mark Robson
- Starring: Anthony Quinn; Alain Delon; George Segal; Michèle Morgan; Maurice Ronet; Claudia Cardinale; Grégoire Aslan
- Cinematography: Robert Surtees (Panavision)
- Edited by: Dorothy Spencer
- Music by: Franz Waxman
- Production company: Red Lion
- Distributed by: Columbia Pictures
- Release date: May 1966
- Running time: 130 minutes
- Country: United States
- Language: English
- Box office: $1,150,000 (est. US/ Canada rentals); 4,294,756 admissions (France)

Lost Command (aka Les Centurions) is a 1966 American war film directed and produced by Mark Robson and starring Anthony Quinn, Alain Delon, George Segal, Michèle Morgan, Maurice Ronet and Claudia Cardinale. It is based on the best-selling 1960 novel The Centurions by Jean Lartéguy. The film focuses on the story of French paratroopers battling in French Indochina and French Algeria.

== Plot ==
In the final moments of the 1954 Battle of Dien Bien Phu, a weakened French battalion awaits a last assault by communist Việt Minh troops.

The battalion commander, Basque Lt. Col. Pierre-Noël Raspéguy (Anthony Quinn), has called central headquarters for reinforcements. Headquarters sends only a single plane load of French paratroopers, under the command of Major de Clairefons. Despite Raspéguy's attempts to provide covering fire, the paratroopers are slaughtered as they land. Major de Clairefons is killed when his parachute drags him into a minefield. Raspéguy is enraged that General Melies (Jean Servais) sent only one plane, and further believes that Melies intends to make him responsible for the entire debacle at Dien Bien Phu.

The Việt Minh overrun the French, with the survivors captured and imprisoned. Among Raspéguy's friends are military historian Captain Phillipe Esclavier (Alain Delon), Indochina-born Captain Boisfeures (Maurice Ronet), surgeon Captain Dia (Gordon Heath) and Lt. Ben Mahidi (George Segal), an Algerian-born paratrooper who turns down a Việt Minh leader's (Burt Kwouk) offer for preferential treatment because he is an Arab. Raspéguy's leadership keeps the men together in their captivity. When released after a treaty between the Việt Minh and France, Raspéguy leads his men in demolishing a delousing station that they see as a humiliation.

Upon his return home to Algeria, Ben Mahidi is disgusted at the treatment of his people, especially when his teenaged brother is machine gunned by the police for painting graffiti in support of independence from France. He deserts from the army to join the rebels of the Algerian National Liberation Front (FLN), becoming a guerrilla leader.

Upon his own return from Indochina, Lt. Col. Raspéguy starts a relationship with Countess Nathalie de Clairefons (Michèle Morgan), widow of the Major who died while trying to reinforce Raspéguy's battalion. The Countess' military contacts result in Raspéguy being given command of the new 10th Regiment of Parachutistes Coloniaux, serving under General Melies in the Algerian War.

The General briefs him that the command is his last chance in the military: if his Regiment fails, Raspéguy's career is finished. Raspéguy recruits his comrades-in-arms from Indochina and trains his battalion with harsh methods, such as using live ammunition on an assault course to encourage speed and initiative.

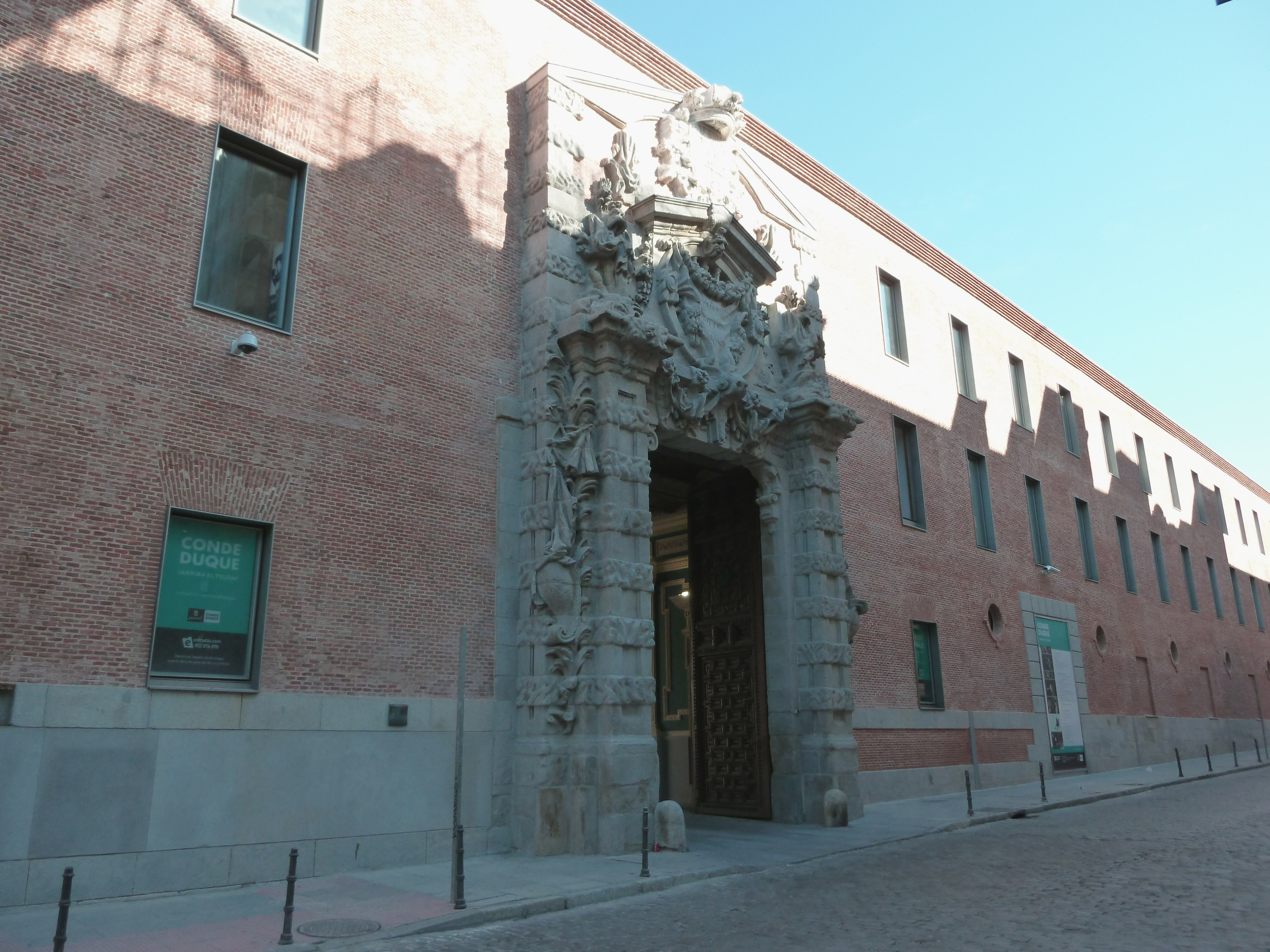
The building Esclavier leaves at the end was filmed at Cuartel del Conde-Duque, Madrid.

Soon after beginning counter-insurgency operations in both urban and rural environments, Esclavier falls in love with Mahidi's sister Aicha (Claudia Cardinale), who is loyal to the FLN and uses her friendship with Esclavier to smuggle explosive detonators. The previously naive Esclavier begins to have a new view of his nation's conduct as the FLN rebels and French paratroopers try to outdo each other in breaking the rules of war.

Raspéguy eventually turns on his old comrades who have become too sympathetic to the FLN. Referred to as General, but still wearing Lt. Col. ranks, Raspéguy's last scene shows him receiving a medal while his Regiment is presented with a unit citation. Outside the compound where this is happening Esclavier, who has left the army in disgust, laughs when he sees a child painting a pro-independence slogan on the wall.

== Cast ==
- Anthony Quinn as Lieut. Col. Pierre-Noël Raspéguy
- Alain Delon as Captain Phillipe Esclavier
- Maurice Ronet as Captain Julien Boisfeuras
- George Segal as Lt. Ben Mahidi
- Michèle Morgan as Countess Natalie de Clairefons (as Michele Morgan)
- Claudia Cardinale as Aicha Mahidi
- Grégoire Aslan as Doctor Ali Ben Saad (as Gregorie Asian)
- Jean Servais as General Melies
- Maurice Sarfati as Merle
- Jean-Claude Bercq as Orsini
- Syl Lamont (voice: Robert Rietti) as Verte
- Jacques Marin as Mayor
- Jean-Paul Moulinot as DeGuyot (as Jean Paul Moulinot)
- Andrés Monreal as Ahmed (as Andres Monreal)
- Gordon Heath as Dia
- Albert Simono as Sapinsky (as Simono)
- René Havard as Fernand (as Rene Havard)
- Armand Mestral as Administration Officer
- Burt Kwouk as Viet Officer
- Al Mulock as Mugnier
- Marie Burke as Madame Raspeguy
- Aldo Sambrell as Ibrahim (as Aldo Sanbrell)
- George Rigaud as Priest (as Jorge Rigaud)
- Roberto Robles as Manuel
- Emilio Carrer as Father Mahidi
- Carmen Tarrazo as Mother Mahidi
- Howard Hagan as Pilot
- Mario De Barros as Geoffrin
- Walter Kelley as Major M.P. (as Walter Kelly)
- Robert Sutton as Yusseff
- Simon Benzakein as Arab Customer
- Héctor Quiroga as Bakhti (as Hector Quiroga)
- Félix de Pomés as Aged Speaker (as Felix de Pomes)

== Production ==
=== Writing ===
Mark Robson bought the novel's film rights for his Red Lion company in March 1963. The screenplay was written by Nelson Gidding, who had previously adapted Nine Hours to Rama for Robson.

=== Casting ===
Robson reportedly held off making the film for a year so he could get Anthony Quinn for the lead. Quinn's character is loosely based on Marcel Bigeard, the actual commander in French Indochina, who led the unit that was the predecessor to the 6th Marine Infantry Parachute Regiment (the 6th Colonial Parachute Battalion). Bigeard later commanded the 3rd Colonial Parachute Regiment in French Algeria.

=== Filming ===
The film was shot on location in Spain. Technical support was provided by Commandant René Lepage, who had served in the 6th Marine Infantry Parachute Regiment of the French Army.

== Release ==
Despite the novel's success, the release of another film called The Centurians led to the film's title being changed. At one stage it was going to be From Indo-China to the Gates of Algiers then Not For Honor and Glory before it was decided to use Lost Command. It premièred in the United States in May 1966. It was released in France a few months later.

=== Box Office ===
The film was not particularly popular in the US, earning rentals of $1,150,000. It was the fifth most popular movie at the French box office in 1966, after La Grande Vadrouille, Dr Zhivago, Is Paris Burning? and A Fistful of Dollars.

=== Critical reception ===
The film received mixed reviews. The New York Times described it as mundane concluding it "is all too reminiscent, except for the labels of name, time and place of the many standard war films that have preceded Lost Command." Filmink argued the movie was soon overshadowed by The Battle of Algiers.

== Sequel ==
In 1963 Robson bought the rights to Larteguy's The Praetorians, a follow-up to The Centurions. The film was never made.

== See also ==
- The Battle of Algiers, a 1966 classic Italian docudrama on the Algerian War
- Chronicle of the Years of Fire, a 1975 Algerian drama historical film directed by Mohammed Lakhdar-Hamina. It depicts the Algerian War of Independence as seen through the eyes of a peasant.
- Lion of the Desert, a similar movie featuring Quinn about Omar Mukhtar's Libyan resistance against Italian occupation.

== Notes ==
Citations
