= The Centurions (Lartéguy novel) =

1960 novel by Jean Lartéguy

- Author: Jean Lartéguy
- Original title: Les centurions
- Translator: Xan Fielding
- Language: French
- Publisher: Presses de la Cité
- Publication date: 1960
- Media type: Print
- Preceded by: La tragédie du Maroc interdit
- Followed by: Les prétoriens

The Centurions (French title: Les Centurions) is a novel written by French journalist and former soldier Jean Lartéguy following a French airborne battalion through the First Indochina War, Algerian War, and Suez Crisis. It was published in 1960 and translated from the original French into English by Xan Fielding. The novel included the first use of the so-called "ticking time bomb" scenario. It won the 1960 Prix Ève Delacroix. In 1966, The Centurions was adapted into a motion picture, Lost Command, starring Anthony Quinn.

== Characters ==
- Aicha – An Algerian Muslim woman who falls in love with de Glatigny.
- Julien Boisfeuras, Captain - A Franco-Chinese soldier with an expertise in unconventional and political warfare. He spearheads the implementation of torture to end the bombing campaign during the Battle of Algiers. It has been claimed that he was loosely modeled on Paul Aussaresses, a SDECE captain, although Lartéguy himself stated that Boisfeuras was completely fictitious.
- Dia, Captain - A Kpelle from French Guinea and member of the medical corps.
- Philippe Esclavier, Captain – A composite character, partly modeled on Maurice Barrès' grandson who fought in the Korean War and was killed in Tunisia.
- Jacques de Glatigny, Major – A noble-born former cavalry officer turned paratrooper. Based on Pierre Fresnay's character in La Grande Illusion.
- Leroy, Lieutenant
- Mahmoudi, Lieutenant – An Algerian Muslim officer with divided loyalties.
- Yves Marindelle, Lieutenant
- Merle, Lieutenant
- Orsini, Captain
- Pinières, Captain
- Beudin, Major
- Pierre-Noel Raspéguy, Colonel – Born a Basque shepherd, he rose through the ranks to eventually command the 10th Parachute Regiment. The character was modeled on Colonel Marcel Bigeard.

== Reception ==
The Centurions was highly successful in France at the time of its writing and sold over 420,000 copies. Indochina expert Bernard Fall called it "one of France's greatest bestsellers since World War II." In 1972, the American journal The French Review stated that Lartéguy "almost overnight became something of a household" name in France after its publication, and that during the 1960s, he was one of the most widely read authors in the nation. It went on to say that Larteguy, beginning with The Centurions, was partly responsible for a revival of novel reading in France where, at the time according to statistics cited from Le Figaro Littéraire, 38% of adults had never read a book.

As American involvement in the Vietnam War increased, it was studied by American officers and Special Forces soldiers. The book regained currency with the onset of the Global War on Terrorism and the insurgency phase of the Iraq War. Since then, it has often been quoted or analyzed in works on counter-insurgency. Some individuals who have either publicly praised The Centurions or quoted it in their own work include:

- Bernard Fall, French war correspondent
- Alistair Horne, British historian
- Robert D. Kaplan, American writer
- Barry McCaffrey, U.S. Army general
- Stanley McChrystal, U.S. Army general
- Ralph Peters, U.S. Army lieutenant colonel and writer
- David Petraeus, U.S. Army general
- Lewis Sorley, author of A Better War
- James Stockdale, U.S. Navy vice admiral and Medal of Honor recipient
- Roger Trinquier, French army colonel
- Anthony Zinni, U.S. Marine general
- Mark Hertling, U.S. Army general
