= Jean Lartéguy =

French writer, journalist and former soldier

- Born: Jean Pierre Lucien Osty; 5 September 1920; Maisons-Alfort, Val-de-Marne, France
- Died: 23 February 2011 (aged 90)
- Occupations: Writer, journalist, war correspondent
- Writing career
- Notable awards: Albert Londres Prize (1955)
- Military career
- Allegiance: Free France
- Service years: 1942 – 1949
- Rank: Captain
- Unit: 1st Commando Group
- War: World War II
- Awards: Légion d'honneur Croix de guerre 1939-1945; Croix de Guerre TOE

Jean Lartéguy (5 September 1920 in Maisons-Alfort – 23 February 2011) was the pen name of Jean Pierre Lucien Osty, a French writer, journalist, and former soldier.

Larteguy is credited with first envisioning the "ticking time bomb" scenario of torture in his 1960 novel Les centurions.

== Biography ==
Lartéguy was born into what he called "one of those families of poor mountain peasants whose names are found inscribed on war memorials, but not in history books" in Maisons-Alfort, Val-de-Marne. Both his father and uncle had served in the First World War. With his country conquered by the Germans, Lartéguy escaped from France into Spain in March 1942. He remained there for nine months and spent time in a Francoist jail before joining the Free French Forces as an officer in the 1st Commando Group (1er groupe de commandos). During the war, he fought in Italy; Vosges and Belfort, France; and Germany. He remained on active duty for seven years until becoming a captain in the reserves in order to enter the field of journalism. Lartéguy received numerous military awards, including the Légion d'honneur, the Croix de guerre 1939-1945, and the Croix de guerre T.O.E.

After his military service, Lartéguy worked as a war correspondent, particularly for the magazine Paris Match. He covered conflicts in Azerbaijan, Korea, Israel, Indochina, Algeria, and Vietnam. In pursuit of a story at the start of the Korean War, Lartéguy volunteered for the French Battalion and was wounded by an enemy hand grenade during the Battle of Heartbreak Ridge. In Latin America, he reported on various revolutions and insurgencies, and in 1967 encountered Che Guevara shortly before his capture and execution. In the July 1967 issue of Paris Match, Lartéguy wrote a major article entitled "Les Guerilleros", where he wrote: "At a time when Cuban revolutionaries want to create Vietnams all over the world, the Americans run the risk of finding their own Algeria in Latin America."

In 1955, he received the Albert Londres Prize for journalism.

== Writing ==
His experiences as a soldier and war correspondent influenced his writing. Some of the most emphasized topics in his writing are decolonization, nationalism, the expansion of communism, the state of post-war French society, and the unglamorous nature of war. His novel Les chimères noires evokes the role played by Roger Trinquier during the Katanga Crisis. Published in 1963 it portrays vividly the chaos of civil war in the Congo after the murder of Patrice Lumumba and the conflict between Moise Tshombe's secessionist government and the United Nations Forces. The novel is very critical of Belgian colonialism and is also a reliable expression of European views of Central Africa after independence. Several of his book titles were translated into English, with the most successful being his Algerian War series: The Centurions and The Praetorians. The former was adapted into a major motion picture in 1966, entitled Lost Command and starred Anthony Quinn. Both have been interpreted as romans à clef glamorizing Vietnam veterans deeply engaged in Algerian politics, such as Marcel Bigeard and Jacques Massu.

Also, with his novel The Centurions, Lartéguy is credited with being the first to envision the 'ticking time bomb' scenario, which has regained relevance in recent debates on the use of torture in a counter-terrorism role. His novels have been read by military professionals, including General David Petraeus, in the new context of modern terrorism.

=== Bibliography ===
- La ville étranglée (1955)
- Les âmes errantes (1956)
- La tragédie du Maroc interdit (1957)
- Les dieux meurent en Algérie (1960)
- Les baladins de la Margeride (1962)
- Visa pour l'Iran (1962)
- Les mercenaires (1963) (Originally published as Du sang sur les collines, without success, reprinted with the new title after the success of Les centurions)
- Les chimères noires (1963), translated into English as The Hounds of Hell
- Guerre d'Algérie, two volumes
1. Les centurions (1963), translated into English as The Centurions, adapted into film as Lost Command
2. Les prétoriens (1964), translated into English as The Praetorians
- Le mal jaune (1965), translated into English as Yellow Fever, (Reprint of two previously published titles: La ville étranglée and Les âmes errantes)
- Un million de dollars le Viet (1965)
- Sauveterre (1966), translated into English
- Les guérilleros (1967)
- Les chimères noires (1967)
- Les tambours de bronze (1969), translated into English as The Bronze Drums
- Ces voix qui nous viennent de la mer (1969)
- Tout homme est une guerre civile, two volumes
1. Le prêtre astronome (1969)
2. Les libertadors (1970)
- Lettre ouverte aux bonnes femmes (1972)
- Les Rois mendiants (1975)

+++ "Adieu à Saigon " (1976)

- Enquête sur un crucifié (1976)
- Tout l'or du diable (1976)
- Les rois mendiants (1977)
- Les naufragés du soleil, three volumes
1. Le gaur de la rivière noire (1978)
2. Le cheval de feu (1980)
3. Le baron céleste (1982)
- Dieu, l'or et le sang (1980)
- Le commandant du nord (1982)
- Marco Polo espion de Venise (1984)
- Soldats perdus et fous de Dieu, Indochine 1954-1955 (1986)
- L'or de Baal (1987)
- Tahiti (1988)
- Le Roi noir, (1991)
- Mourir pour Jérusalem (1995), (non-fiction)
