= University of Oslo's Human Rights Award =

Norwegian human rights award

University of Oslo's Human Rights Award (Norwegian: UiOs menneskerettighetspris) honours individuals who have made important contributions in different fields. The award was launched in 1986 and since then, it is awarded every year to notable people from different walks of life. Those years when the award was not distributed are 1997, 1999, 2003, and 2004.

It is also called the Lisl and Leo Eitinger Prize.

== Recipients ==
- 2017: İştar Gözaydın, Turkish professor of Law and Politics
- 2016: Diana Kordon is an Argentinian psychiatrist and anti-torture activist.
- 2015: Deeyah Khan is a Norwegian, film director, music producer, composer and human rights defender. She was awarded for her work which shed light on the problem of young Muslims' adherence to radical Islam and extremism. But the main reason behind this award was deeyah efforts for women's rights and freedom of expression.
- 2014: Fabrizio Gatti is an Italian investigative journalist and author. He received the award for his reports and books on the utilization and exploitation of desperate migrants traveling through the African desert, the Mediterranean Sea, drowning accidents and push-backs as refugees meetings of border guards and coast guards in their attempts to reach Europe.
- 2013: Manfred Nowak is an Austrian human rights lawyer. He was awarded for the defense of fundamental human rights.
- 2012: Robert Quinn and Scholars at Risk. Rob Quinn is the founder and director of Scholars at Risk, which is a U.S.-based international network of academic institutions organized to support and defend the principles of academic freedom and to defend the human rights of scholars around the world. Robert Quinn at Scholars at Risk received the award for their efforts to promote academic freedom and to protect endangered academics.
- 2011: Nawal El Saadawi is an Egyptian feminist writer, activist, physician and psychiatrist. she received the award for her active international involvement. Award Committee specially mentioned her efforts for women's social and intellectual freedom and their legal position.
- 2010: Sonja Biserko is a Serbian campaigner for human rights. She is the founder and president of the Helsinki Committee for Human Rights in Serbia. She received the award for her efforts in working with refugees, documenting war crimes and women's rights.
- 2009: Nils Johan Lavik was a Norwegian professor of psychiatry. He received the award for his work for refugees in Norway, and to strengthen the knowledge and respect for human rights among physicians and health professionals.
- 2008: Erik Møse is a Norwegian judge. He was the President of the International Criminal Tribunal for Rwanda from 2003 to 2007. He received the award for his efforts and active international engagement for years to promote human rights
- 2007: Khaled Abou El Fadl is the Professor of Law at the UCLA School of Law. He was awarded for his analysis between Islamic Law and Human Rights.
- 2006: Ole Henrik Magga is a Sámi linguist and politician from Kautokeino Municipality, Norway. He was awarded for his efforts and active international involvement of the Sami and the world's indigenous peoples through the years
- 2005: Theo van Boven is a Dutch jurist and professor emeritus in international law. He got the prize for his contribution to fight torture, enforced disappearance and other severe violations of human rights.
- 2002: Asma Jahangir is a Pakistani lawyer and human rights activist, she got the prize for her fight against honour killings in her home country, and her international work as UN Special Rapporteur on extrajudicial, summary or arbitrary executions
- 2001: Magen David Adom and the Palestine Red Crescent Society got the prize for their outstanding humanitarian contribution during the present conflict in the Middle East
- 2000: Radhika Coomaraswamy is from Sri Lanka, she is a director of the International Centre for Ethnic Studies in Colombo, and the United Nations special rapporteur on violence against women, including its causes and consequences.
- 1998: Maria Paz Rojaz Baeza is a Chilean doctor and human rights activist, she got the prize for her work with torture victims and her involvement in human rights issues in South America
- 1996: Felice Lieh Mak is a Chinese professor of psychiatry who got the award for the struggle against laws of discrimination (forced abortion, intellectually disabled) proposed by the Chinese authorities
- 1995: Adem Demaçi Adem Demaçi (born 26 February 1936 in Pristina) is a Kosovo Albanian activist.
- 1994: Kristian Ottosen got the prize for his lifetime work of documenting the fate of all Norwegians who were captured by the Nazis and incarcerated in Germany during World War II.
- 1993: Gerhard Schoenberner got the prize For his activities to teach Germans about the terrors of the Nazis.
- 1992: Lopez and Marcelliano got the prize for their fight against violence and torture in the Philippines.
- 1991: Eigil Nansen got the prize for his work with refugees and human rights
- 1990: Georg Klein The Swedish pathologist who has been occupied with humanistic work
- 1989: Inge Genefke got the prize for her work at the rehabilitation centre for torture victims in Copenhagen, Denmark
- 1988: Robert Lifton got the prize for his study on the aftermath of the atomic bomb and the psychology of Nazi-KZ-doctors
- 1987: A. Koragin is a Russian psychiatrist who got the prize for his fight against the political misuse of psychiatry.
- 1986: Elie Wiesel, Wiesel has received the award for his outstanding contribution to the cause of peace.
