= Mónica Feria Tinta =

British-Peruvian barrister

Monica Feria Tinta
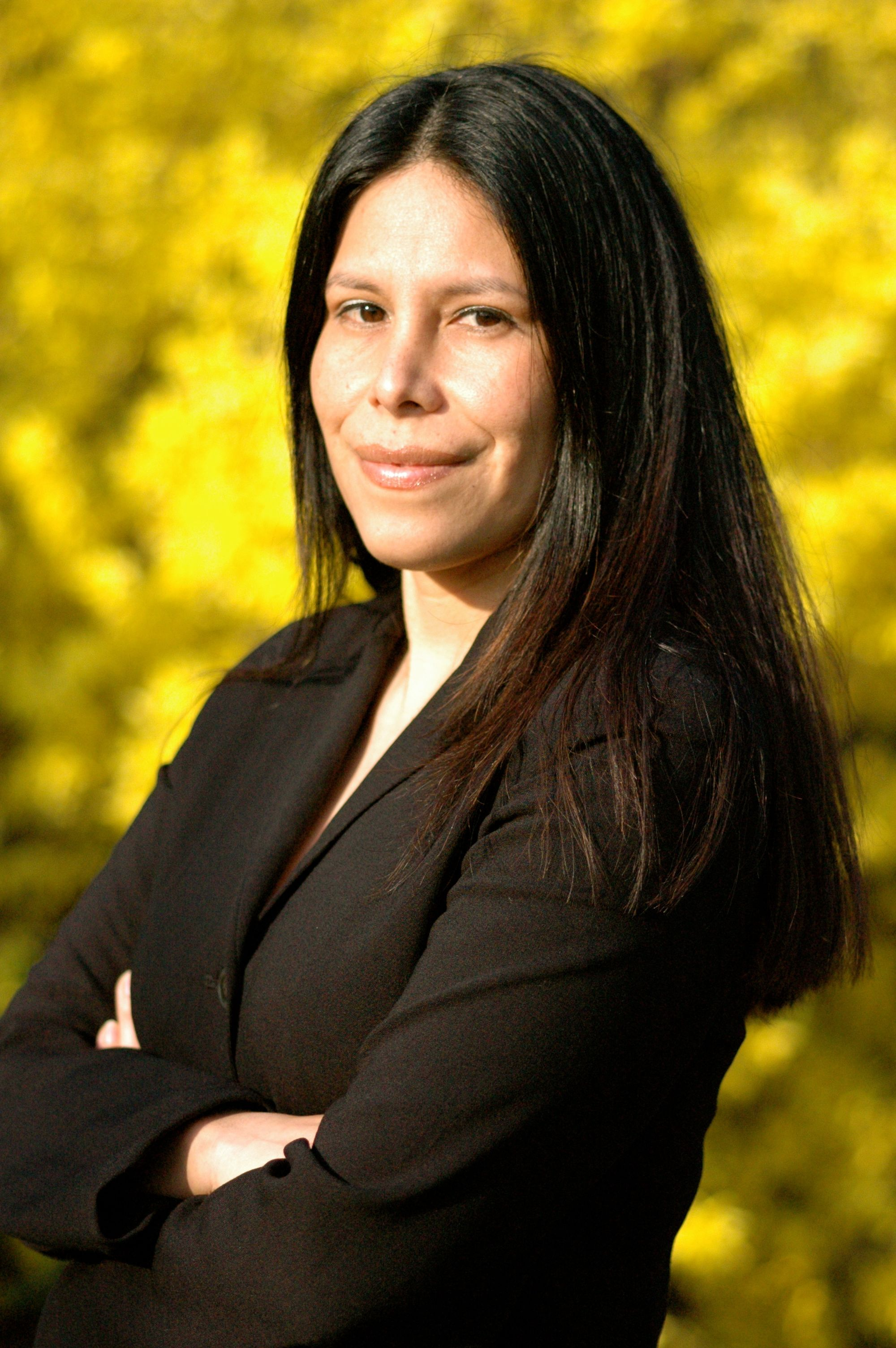
- Monica Feria Tinta at the Gruber Justice Prize in 2007
- Born: 1966 (age 59–60); Lima, Peru
- Education: Pontifical Catholic University of Peru; London School of Economics; University of Cambridge
- Occupation: Barrister
- Awards: The Inge Genefke Award (2006); Gruber Prize for Justice (2007); The Lawyer Awards – "Barrister of the Year" Finalist (2020); Chambers & Partners UK Bar Awards Environment Junior of the Year (2023); The Legal 500 Bar Awards ‘International Law Junior of the Year’ Finalist (2024); The Times' first 'Lawyer of the Week' (2025); Woman of the Year -Women & Diversity Law Awards (2025); The Lawyer Awards - "Barrister of the Year" Finalist (2025)

Monica Feria Tinta (born 1966) is a British/Peruvian barrister, a specialist in public international law, at the Bar of England & Wales. She practises from Twenty Essex, London. She has been referred to as 'one of Britain's most dazzling legal minds'.

In 2000 Monica Feria-Tinta became the first and only Peruvian-born lawyer to receive the prestigious Diploma of The Hague Academy of International Law in history, the year Professor Pierre-Marie Dupuy delivered the General Course. Her litigation work led to the first international human rights court decision ordering the prosecution of a former head of state for crimes under international law. In 2006 she was awarded the Inge Genefke International Award for her work as an international lawyer and in 2007 she became the youngest lawyer to be awarded the Gruber Justice Prize, for her contributions to advancing the cause of justice as delivered through the legal system; an honour she received at a ceremony chaired by US Supreme Court Justice Ruth Bader Ginsburg in Washington DC.

Feria-Tinta was the first Latin American lawyer to be called to and practising at the Bar of England and Wales. She is also a member of the American Society of International Law, a partner fellow at the Lauterpacht Centre for International Law, and a visiting fellow at Jesus College, University of Cambridge. In 2019 she was amongst the 64 distinguished women barristers selected to feature in the celebratory exhibition of a Century of Women in Law at the Middle Temple. The exhibition marked 100 years since women were permitted to enter the legal profession in England & Wales, led by Helena Normanton, the first woman to practise as a barrister in England. Feria-Tinta is a Bencher at Middle Temple.

In 2019 she made news as acting Counsel in the first-world climate change litigation brought by peoples from low-lying islands against a State, before the United Nations Human Rights Committee, the Torres Strait Islanders case. In a ground-breaking decision, the U.N. Human Rights Committee found that the failure of a Sovereign State to adequately protect indigenous peoples from low-lying islands against adverse impacts of climate change violated their rights under the International Covenant on Civil and Political Rights. She has been a leading expert on climate change litigation globally, including pioneering an Advisory Opinion before the International Tribunal for the Law of the Sea and the International Court of Justice. She has been the first international law barrister to apply the principle of systemic integration in treaty interpretation to the climate context, so as that the interpretation of pre-existing treaties to the Paris Agreement aligned with the demands of climate action securing in this manner a major breakthrough in the field. In 2024, she authored the first scholarly analysis of the application of this principle in the context of climate change. This interpretative approach was vindicated by the UN Human Rights Committee, the International Tribunal for the Law of the Sea, and all international organs dealing with climate change claims.

== Education and career ==
Feria-Tinta studied international law at the London School of Economics receiving her LL.M. with merit in 1996. She received further training at the Institut International des Droits de l'Homme in Strasbourg (1997) and at the Institute of Human Rights of the Åbo Akademi University in Turku (Finland) under the sponsorship of the European Commission and the Finnish Ministry of Foreign Affairs in 2001. In 2000 she was among the 24 lawyers selected worldwide to be trained by members of the International Law Commission in all areas of General International Law, taking part in the thirty-sixth session of the International Law Seminar in Geneva, pursuant to General Assembly resolution 54/111, under a United Nations Fellowship. Her areas of expertise include international dispute settlement, immunities, consular law, diplomatic protection, treaty law, recognition of state and governments under international law, self-determination under international law, boundary delimitation, law of the sea, territory, investment law, transboundary harm, environmental law, human rights, use of force, laws of war, State Responsibility (inter alia State Responsibility for crimes against humanity, genocide, extrajudicial executions and torture); command responsibility for gross human rights violations; victim rights under international law.

After teaching public international law at the London School of Economics as a teaching assistant to Sir Christopher Greenwood (then professor at LSE), Feria-Tinta spent a year as a visiting research fellow at the Lauterpacht Centre for International Law, University of Cambridge, at the time under the directorship of former Whewell Professor of International Law, James Crawford.

As a practising lawyer Monica Feria-Tinta has advised states, state-owned entities, non self-governing peoples, governments in exile, corporate bodies, international organisations, non-governmental organisations, indigenous peoples, and individuals, in the area of public international law. She started her practising career working for international tribunals; first at the International Criminal Tribunal for the former Yugoslavia and a year later, at the International Court of Justice, gaining experience in the adjudication of complex international litigation both entailing individual international criminal responsibility and State responsibility. She acted as legal advisor for a State Delegation taking part in the negotiations of the Rome Statute, at the Diplomatic Conference of Plenipotentiaries on the Establishment of an International Criminal Court in Rome. During 2018–2019 she served as assistant legal adviser to the Foreign & Commonwealth Office.

In litigation, Feria-Tinta has appeared as counsel before the Inter-American Commission on Human Rights, the Inter-American Court of Human Rights the United Nations Human Rights Committee, UN Special Procedures, OECD Procedures, The High Court (England), and has advised parties before the International Court of Justice, International Tribunal for the Law of the Sea, UN CEDAW Committee, Court of Appeal (England) and Court of Appeal (Hong Kong). Expert opinions provided in different international fora have included an Amicus Curiae to the Constitutional Court of Ecuador (on the Rights of Nature), the UN Human Rights Committee, the Constitutional Court of Colombia (on the Special Jurisdiction for Peace), the Supreme Administrative Court of Colombia (Consejo de Estado), the Supreme Court of Mexico, a joint Amicus Curiae with Professor John Dugard (former Special Rapporteur on Diplomatic Protection at the ILC) for the Appeals Court of Amsterdam, in the Bouterse case, and expert comments on behalf of the Redress Trust to the Final Report of the UN Independent Expert on the Right of Reparation for Victims of Serious Violations of Human Rights and Humanitarian Law, Cherif Bassiouni.

Her advocacy work before the Inter-American Court of Human Rights contributed to pivotal changes in the Inter-American regional system. Monica Feria-Tinta pioneered the rights of victims in the Inter-American system challenging for the first time the use of State appointed Ad hoc Judges in individual petitions before the Inter-American Court of Human Rights, which led to the end of a practice that had existed for nearly two decades. She also advocated for the need of a Victims' Fund for legal aid before the Inter-American Court of Human Rights to ensure access to justice and equality of arms for victims. A Victims Legal Assistance Fund before the ICHR was finally created in 2010.

She litigated the first international human rights case in the world on the protection of the rights of the child in times of war and obtained the first international binding decision on gender justice in the history of adjudication of the Inter-American region, initiating the feminisation of human rights law in the Americas. Most notably, her litigation work on behalf of hundreds of prisoners led to a landmark case on prisoners' rights where the Inter-American Court ruled on a massacre taking place in a prison and on torture practices that had never been tested before an international human rights tribunal, ordering as a consequence, the prosecution of a former head of state for crimes against humanity.

Her forensic experience investigating and documenting torture in international contentious cases, was used as model to train advocates worldwide, representing victims of torture, by the International Rehabilitation Council for Torture Victims.

In 2009 she was commissioned to take part on a project by UNESCO entitled "Freedom from Poverty as a Human Right: Law's Duty to the Poor" (The Philosopher's Library Series) contributing with a thorough study on litigation in Regional Human Rights Systems (European, Inter-American and African) on the justiciability of Economic, Social and Cultural Rights.

Feria Tinta has been a speaker on International law in different fora worldwide including Lancaster House (UK Foreign & Commonwealth Office), the Human Rights Caucus of the US Congress, the Universidad Nacional Autónoma de Mexico, the University of Oxford (Centre for Socio-Legal Studies), the United Nations (Geneva), Trinity College, Dublin (Distinguished Speakers Series), the British Institute of Comparative and International Law, Universidad de los Andes Law Faculty (Colombia), and Georgetown University Law Center. She has been a guest lecturer at Guangxi Normal University, Faculty of Law, China, University of Cambridge (LCIL Executive Course on Investment Law and Arbitration), the National & Kapodistrian University of Athens (Faculty of Law), Universidad de Chile (Faculty of law), Jindal Global Law School (India), Leiden University and at the Master Program of the Institute Universitaire Kurt Bosch-University of Fribourg, Switzerland.

She has taken part in expert missions to Kenya (2020), Myanmar (2016), Guatemala (2015) and has trained South African advocates on international law (2017), Colombian lawyers on judicial processes in the context of transitional justice (2017) and members of the Honduran Bar on international arbitration (2016) under the sponsorship of the UK Mission in Honduras.

In 2020, Feria Tinta acted as 'friend of the court' or 'amicus curiae', providing advice for a case against a mining company exploring Los Cedros forest in Ecuador, which was uninhabited by humans. The judgment of the constitutional court was that the forest had rights and should be preserved. This was the first judgment construing the notion of 'Rights of Nature' in depth, delivered by a Constitutional Court worldwide. In 2020, Feria-Tinta referred to the case as 'one of the most important and worthwhile cases of this century'. Her book A Barrister for the Earth was published in April 2025, having as a backbone her work on the Los Cedros rights of nature case.

== Awards and honours ==
- The Inge Genefke Award (2006)
- Gruber Justice Prize (2007)
- Appointed to the International Union for Conservation of Nature's World Commission on Environmental Law, the global authority on the status of the natural world and the measures needed to safeguard it (Oceans Specialist Group and Climate Change Specialist Group) (2018).
- The Lawyer Magazine "Hot 100" 2020. "The Lawyer" magazine featured her in its "Hot 100" 2020 list, as amongst "the most daring, innovative and creative lawyers" in the United Kingdom.
- The Lawyer Awards – "Barrister of the Year" Finalist (2020). Shortlisted as "Barrister of the Year" by the Lawyer's Awards 2020, alongside Lord Pannick QC, one of the UK's highly regarded advocates.
- Appointed by the government of Malaysia to the AIAC Advisory Council (2021).
- Master of the Bench of Middle Temple (2021).
- Panel of arbitrators for the Free Trade Agreement between the United Kingdom of Great Britain and Northern Ireland, and the Republic of Korea (Proposed by the United Kingdom)(2022).
- Winner – Environment Junior of the Year, Chambers and Partners UK Bar Awards (2023)
- ‘International Law Junior of the Year’ Finalist, the Legal 500 Bar Awards (2024)
- Woman of the Year - Women & Diversity in Law Awards 2025
- The Times' first 'Lawyer of the Week' in 2025

== Cases ==
Arbitral appointments include:-

- Presiding arbitrator, investment arbitration under the Energy Charter Treaty – (chair, appointed by Arbitral Institution)

Selected cases include:-

- Deutsche Bank AG London Branch and Receivers Appointed by the Court, Central Bank of Venezuela, and The Governor and Company of the Bank of England and The Ad Hoc Administrative Board of The Central Bank of Venezuela and the Board of the Central Bank of Venezuela [2020] EWHC 1721 (The High Court, Queen's Bench Division Commercial Court) (Advising the BCV)
- R (Charles & Dunn) v Secretary of State for Foreign and Commonwealth Affairs [2020] EWHC 3185 (Admin) – (for the claimants) (diplomatic immunity case).
- On the Constitutionality of Federal Mining Law – before The Supreme Court of Justice of the Nation (SCJN) of Mexico; Legal Intervention in a constitutional action brought by the Masewal people of Cuetzalan based in the Sierra Norte of the Mexican state of Puebla against Mexico's Federal Mining Law.
- Case of Los Cedros, before the Constitutional Court of Ecuador – (Amicus Curiae) Legal Intervention on the Rights of Nature.
- Sierra Nevada de Santa Marta – Linea Negra Decree 1500 Nullity case, before the Supreme Administrative Court of Colombia – Legal Intervention focusing on international law norms directly relevant to the protection of rainforests and natural world of global importance.
- Cerrejón case before the UN Special Procedures (for claimants) (sole counsel)(concerning alleged violations of environmental harm and human rights by one of the largest open pit coal mines in the world owned by BHP, Anglo American and Glencore).
- Gençay Bastimar v Turkey, CCPR Case No. 3592/2019, before the United Nations Human Rights Committee (for the BHRC of England & Wales) – (Amicus Curiae with leave by the UN HRC)
- Torres Strait Islanders v Australia, UN Human Rights Committee (for the Torres Strait Islanders)
- Montara Oil Spill case (concerning transboundary harm/Australia), UN Special Proceedings (for 13 West Timor regencies)
- Advised non-self-governing peoples on the UN Charter, decolonisation, and statehood.
- Adrian Favela case (concerning enforced disappearance/Mexico), UN Special Proceedings (for the claimants)
- Advised a government on exile on its position under international law, treaty interpretation, statehood and self-determination.
- Case regarding the Constitutionality of Legislative Act No 1, 2017 which establishes the Special Jurisdiction for Peace to prosecute crimes during the internal armed conflict in Colombia, Constitutional Court of Colombia – Amicus Curiae brief on Command Responsibility and Corporate Responsibility (Article 24 and Article 16 respectively)
- Legal Consequences of the separation of the Chagos Archipelago from Mauritius in 1965 (Request for Advisory Opinion), International Court of Justice (Application on behalf of seeking intervener under Article 66 (2) of the ICJ Statute)
- Gareth Henry v Jamaica, Inter-American Commission on Human Rights (Advising the claimant)
- Eloise Mukami Kimathi and others and the Foreign and Commonwealth Office ('The Kenyan Emergency Group Litigation'), High Court of Justice (for the defendant)
- The Enrica Lexie Incident (Italy v India), International Tribunal for the Law of the Sea (advising Italy)
- Case of J v Peru, Inter-American Court of Human rights (for the claimant)
- Communication No 2034/2011 v Canada, UN Human Rights Committee (for the claimants)
- Case of Miguel Castro Castro Prison Massacre vs Peru, Inter-American Court of Human Rights (for the claimant)
- Caso of the Gomez Paquiyauri Brothers vs Peru, Inter-American Court of Human Rights (for the claimants)
- LaGrand case (Federal Republic of Germany v United States of America), International Court of Justice (advising Germany)
- Case Concerning Application of the Convention on the Prevention and Punishment of the Crime of Genocide (Bosnia and Herzegovina v Serbia and Montenegro), International Court of Justice (Advising the ICJ)
- Prosecutor v Timohir Blaskic, International Criminal Tribunal for the Former Yugoslavia (Advising Chamber Trial I)
- Bouterse case, Amsterdam Court of Appeals – Joint Amicus Curiae brief with Professor John Dugard, former Special Rapporteur on Diplomatic Protection at the United Nations International Law Commission

== Selected publications ==
=== Books ===
- Foreign State Immunity and Enforcement of Arbitral Awards in English Courts (Oxford University Press, forthcoming)
- A Barrister for the Earth (Faber, 2025) ISBN 0571386369.
- The Landmark Rulings of the Inter-American Court of Human Rights on the Rights of the Child, (Book) Brill Nijhoff, Series International Studies in Human Rights, 2008 ISBN 9789004165137.

=== Chapters ===
- Mining the bottom of the sea: Potential Future Disputes and the Role of the International Tribunal for the Law of the Sea (co-author) in T Campanella (ed) Handbook of Seabed Mining & The Law of the Sea (Routledge, 2023)ISBN 9781138387614
- Public Interest in Investment Arbitration: The Rapid Ascent of Human Rights, Labour Law and Environmental Law in V. Popovski and A. Malhotra (eds), Reimagining the International Legal Order (Routledge, 2023).ISBN 9781003388821
- "The Future of Environmental cases in the European Court of Human Rights" in N. Kobylarz and E. Grant, Human Rights and the Planet (Elgar Publishers, 2022)ISBN 978 1 80220 428 5
- 'Los Cambios de paradigmas del Derecho Internacional Público: el auge del Derecho Ambiental Internacional'in E. Sobenes et al. Vol. 1 "Hablemos de Derecho Internacional" (2022)
- ‘The Inter-American Court of Human Rights’ in E. Sobenes et al., The Environment Through the Lens of International Courts and Tribunals (Springer, 2022)ISBN 978-94-6265-507-2
- ‘Declarant: Inter-American Court of Human Rights (IACtHR)’, Max Planck Encyclopedia of International Procedural Law, June 2021 (OUP)
- 'Climate Change as a Human Rights Issue: Litigating Climate Change in the Inter-American System of Human Rights and the United Nations Human Rights Committee' in Climate Change Litigation: Global Perspectives, I. Alogna, C. Bakker and J.P. Gauci (eds.)(Brill, 2021)ISBN 978-90-04-44761-5
- 'Arbitration and the European Convention on Human Rights'in International Arbitration and EU Law, J, Mata Dona and N. Lavranos (eds.)(Elgar Publishers, 2021)ISBN 978-17-88-97399-1
- "The UN Convention on the Rights of the Child as a Litigation Tool before the Inter-American System of Protection of Human Rights" in Litigating the Rights of the Child, T Liefaard and J. E. Doek (ed), Springer, 2014 ISBN 978-94-017-9444-2
- "Litigation in Regional Human Rights Systems on Economics, Social and Cultural Rights against Poverty" in Freedom from Poverty as a Human Right Volume 4, 2009 UNESCO Publishing; Van Bueren (ed), Series Editor: Pierre Sane.

=== Articles ===
- ‘Rights of Nature in Human Rights Courts or a Parallel Protection System?’, (EJIL Talk! 23 April 2025)
- ‘Le Droit International Est-il en train de changer? Observations après Duarte Agostinho, Klimaseniorinnen et L’Avis Consultatif du TIDM sur Le Changement Climatique in REVUE INTERNATIONALE DE DROIT COMPARÉ, 4-2024 pp. 157-178.
- 'The Master Key to International law: Systemic Integration in Climate Change Cases'Cambridge International Law Journal 13/1
- ‘An Advisory Opinion on climate emergency and human rights before the Inter-American Court of Human Rights’Questions of International Law, 102 (2023) 45-60, 30 November 2023.
- ‘On the Request for an Advisory Opinion on Climate Change under UNCLOS before the International Tribunal for the Law of the Sea’, Journal of International Dispute Settlement (Volume 12, Issue 3, September 2023, pp 391–406)
- ‘The Future of Environmental Cases in the European Court of Human Rights’, Journal of Human Rights and the Environment, Vol. 13 Special Issue, October 2022
- ‘Torres Strait Islanders: United Nations Human Rights Committee Delivers Ground-Breaking Decision on Climate Change Impacts on Human Rights’, (EJIL Talk! September, 2022)
- ‘Climate Change Litigation in the European Court of Human Rights: Causation, Imminence and Other Key Underlying Notions’, L’Europe des Droits et Libertés Journal, December 2020 (Issue 3)
- 'Banking and Human Rights: World Bank Group immunities after Jam et al. v International Finance Corp’ in the Journal of International Banking Law and Regulation (JIBLR) (2019) issue 34 (10).
- 'International Environmental Law for the 21st Century', Anuario Colombiano de Derecho Internacional Vol 21, 2019.
- 'The Rise of Environmental Law in International Dispute Resolution: The Inter-American Court of Human Rights Issues a Landmark Advisory Opinion on the Environment and Human Rights’ Yearbook of International Environmental Law (Oxford University Press 11 October 2018).
- 'Bolivia and Chile in The Hague: Can They Quiet the Ghosts of the Pacific War, and Thrive together in the 21st Century?’ Opinio Juris (27 March 2018)
- ‘Sovereign Debt Enforcement in English Courts: Ukraine and Russia meet in the Court of Appeal in US $3 Billion Eurobonds Dispute’ (2018) 33(2) Journal of International Banking Law and Regulation (with A. Wooder).
- ‘Like Oil and Water? Human Rights in Investment Arbitration in the Wake of Philip Morris v. Uruguay’ (2017) 34(4) Journal of International Arbitration 601
- 'Extra-Territorial Claims in the "Spider's Web" of the Law? UK Supreme Court Judgment in Ministry of Defence v Iraqi Civilians’ EJIL Talk! (25 May 2016)
- 'The South China Sea: Chess Arbitration?’ EJIL: Talk! (10 August 2016).
- "Justiciability of Economic, Social and Cultural Rights in the Inter-American System of Protection of Human Rights: Beyond Traditional Paradigms and Notions"; Human Rights Quarterly, Volume 29, Number 2, May 2007, pp. 431–459.
- "Primer caso internacional sobre violencia de género en la jurisprudencia de la Corte Interamericana de Derechos Humanos: El caso del penal Miguel Castro Castro; un hito histórico para Latinoamérica." CEJIL journal year II, No. 3 (2006)
- "La Responsabilidad Internacional del Estado en el Sistema Interamericano de Protección de Derechos Humanos a 25 años del funcionamiento de la Corte Interamericana de Derechos Humanos: Las Lecciones del Caso Hermanos Gómez Paquiyauri." UNAM
- "La Víctima ante la Corte interamericana de Derechos Humanos a 25 años de su funcionamiento"; Revista IIDH, Instituto Interamericano de Derechos Humanos 43.
- "Due Process and the Right to Life in the Context of the Vienna Convention on Consular Relations: Arguing the LaGrand Case", EJIL 2001.
- "Commanders on Trial: The Blaškić. Case and the Doctrine of Command Responsibility under International Law", Netherlands International Law Review / Volume 47 / Issue 03 / December 2000, pp 293–322.
- "Individual Human Rights v. State Sovereignty: The Case of Peru's Withdrawal from the Contentious Jurisdiction of the Inter-American Court of Human Rights" Leiden Journal of International Law (2000), 13: 985-996 Cambridge University Press.
- M. Feria-Tinta and G. Verdirame, ‘The Entry into Force of the Human Rights Act, 1998’, 4 International Law Association Forum (2000) 213-217.
- "The Right to Seek Asylum and the Authority of International Refugee Law: The Case of the United Kingdom", African Yearbook of International Law, Volume 8, 2000.
