= İştar Gözaydın =

Turkish professor of Law and Politics

İştar Gözaydın (April 5, 1959 - Istanbul, Turkey) is a professor of Law and Politics. She is also a founder of the Helsinki Citizens Assembly, a human rights organization in Turkey. She was a research fellow at the University of London, Birkbeck College Birkbeck, University of London in 2009 and she was a Fulbright Program scholar in the U.S. in 1986-87.

She was detained after December 20, 2016 in the aftermath of the failed coup attempt in Turkey in the summer of the same year. Following her detention she was formally arrested on suspicion of "being a member of an armed terror organisation" on the basis of alleged testimonies from a secret witness and an intelligence report. She was detained at Şakran prison, İzmir Province. Her arbitrary detention and judicial harassment were part of the FETÖ/PDY (Fethullahist Terror Organisation/ Parallel State Structure) Investigation launched in 2015 by İzmir Chief Public Prosecutor's Office and Organised Crime Bureau Prosecutor's Office into Gediz University, targeting several academics, following July's failed coup. The investigation was based on allegations that these academics are either members, or connected to terrorist organisations. Several human rights' organizations had asked for action to be taken. She was freed after 94 days of arrest, in late March, 2017.

Dr. Gözaydın was fully acquitted in 2018, however since her passport was nullified by the authorities, and have not been returned for a full three years, she had not been able to physically attend the Leibniz Professorship position that she was granted in 2018 at Leibzig University. She has been producing and presenting radio programs on law, politics and music (currently on Bach) at Açık Radyo (Open Radio) since 1995 where she was one of the founding members. She has been attending Femfikir debate programs where national and international politics are discussed by a group of female experts since it was launched in December 2017 at Medyascope, an independent internet medium based in Istanbul. Gözaydın lost her husband İskender Savaşır in June 2018 after a short episode of 4.5 months after a diagnosis of acute cancer.

She was awarded the 2017 University of Oslo's Human Rights Award, Lisl and Leo Eitinger Prize.

== Education ==
Gözaydın has studied at the New York University School of Law and Georgetown University International Law Institute, and holds an LLD degree from the Istanbul University. Prof. Gözaydın also produces and presents program aired by Açık Radyo (Open Radio), in Istanbul since 1995.

== Research ==
Gözaydın's research interests are

- Modernity, Modernities, Modernization
- Nation, Nationalism, and State Formation
- History, Politics, Law and Society of Turkey
- Religion, State and Society
- Human Rights with a special focus on religious discrimination Administrative Law, Comparative History of Law, Law and Cultural Studies (cinema and law, literature and law)
- Politics
- Social Theory"

She is focusing on the relations between religion and state in Modern Turkey.

== Selected bibliography ==
=== Books ===
- Müslüman Toplum, "Laik" Devlet : Türkiye'de Diyanet Isleri Baskanligi (Muslim Society, "Secular" State in Turkey : Directorate of Religious Affairs), Afa, Istanbul 1993 (last name: Tarhanli) (in Turkish)
- Belediyecinin Basucu Kitabi (A Handbook for the Municipalities) (co-authors : Dr. Ercan Eyüpoglu and Fikret Toksöz), a publication of Union of Local Administrations in Marmara Region, Istanbul 1994 (in Turkish)
- Bir Toplumda Birarada Yasamak için Akilda Tutulmasi Gerekenlere Dair El Kitabi (A Guidebook for Legal Issues to Keep In Mind in order to Live In a Community), a publication of MESS, Istanbul 1999 (in Turkish)
- "Adding Injury to Injury", in Evil, Law and the State: Issues in State Power and Violence, ed. John Parry, Rodopi Press, 59-69, Amsterdam / New York, NY 2006.
- "Turkey: A Women's History," in Bonnie G. Smith (ed): The Oxford Encyclopedia of Women in World History, v.4, Oxford University Press, 2008, 255-258
- "Diyanet and Politics", The Muslim World, vol. 98, no. 2/3 (April/July 2008) 216-227
- "Religion, Politics and the Politics of Religion in Turkey", in Dietrich Jung & Catharina Raudvere (ed.), Religion, Politics and Turkey's EU Accession, Palgrave-Macmillan, September 2008, 159-176
- Diyanet: Türkiye Cumhuriyeti'nde Dinin Tanzimi. Iletisim Yayinlari (revised and updated 2nd edition), Istanbul 2009 (in Turkish)
- "Diyanet İşleri Başkanlığı," in John L. Esposito (ed): Encyclopedia of the Islamic World, Oxford University Press, February 2009
- "The Fethullah Gülen Movement and Politics in Turkey : a chance for Democratization or a Trojan Horse?:", Democratization, vol. 16 no. 6 (December 2009), 1214-1236
- "Religion, politique et politique de la religion en Turquie", cahiers de l'obtic, décembre 2012-n.2, 4-8.
- "Ahmet Davutoğlu: Role as an Islamic Scholar Shaping Turkey's Foreign Policy" in Nassef Manabilang Adiong (ed.): Islam and International Relations: Diverse Perspectives, Cambridge Scholars Publishing, 2013
- "Management of Religion in Turkey": the Diyanet and Beyond" in Özgür Heval Çınar & Mine Yıldırım (ed.s): Freedom of Religion and Belief in Turkey, Cambridge Scholars Publishing, Newcastle upon Tyne 2014, 10-35
- Öztürk, Ahmet Erdi, and İştar Gözaydın. "Turkey's constitutional amendments: a critical perspective." Research and Policy on Turkey 2.2 (2017): 210-224.
- Öztürk, Ahmet Erdi, and İştar Gözaydın. "A Frame for Turkey's Foreign Policy via the Diyanet in the Balkans." Journal of Muslims in Europe 7.3 (2018): 331-350.
