= Program for Torture Victims =

United States non-profit organization

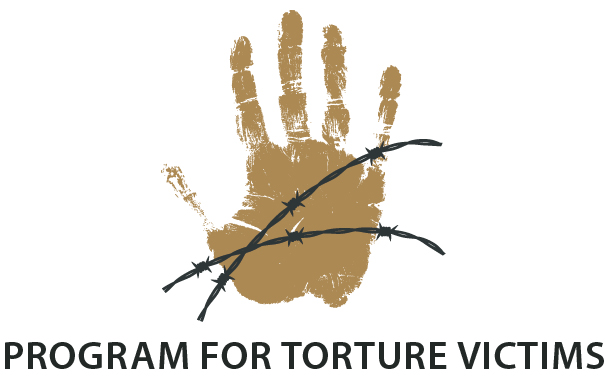
- Type: Non-Profit; NGO
- Founded: 1980
- Founders: Ana Deutsch, M.F.T. & José Quiroga, M.D.
- Executive Director: Ana Grande
- Location: Los Angeles, Santa Ana
- Services: Primary Medical Care; Mental Health Care; Evaluation & Expert Testimony; Social Services & Basic Needs; Peer Support; Professional Training; Public Education & Advocacy
- Website: www.ptvla.org

The Program for Torture Victims (PTV) is a non-profit organization that provides medical, psychological, case management and legal services to torture survivors. PTV serves more than 300 victims of state-sponsored torture from over 65 countries annually.

== History ==
The Program for Torture Victims (PTV) was founded in 1980 by Dr. José Quiroga and Ana Deutsch.

Both Quiroga and Deutsch sought asylum in the United States and met in Los Angeles in 1979. They began working on a campaign against torture with the Los Angeles Amnesty International Medical Group. The organization was conducting a study documenting cases of torture and the consequences for refugees and asylum-seekers in the United States. Quiroga assessed the medical consequences of torture while Deutsch assessed the victims' psychological well-being. However, Amnesty International decided that they, as an organization, were unable to provide direct treatment to torture survivors. Quiroga and Deutsch knew that the torture survivors with whom they had been working needed rehabilitation services and decided to start the Program for Torture Victims.

After the study by the Amnesty International Medical Group was completed, Quiroga presented it to the American Psychological Association. This was among the first research on the medical and psychological consequences of torture. Quiroga and Deutsch quickly became known as professionals treating victims of torture. It wasn't until 1987, years after PTV began, that the United Nations Convention Against Torture and Other Cruel, Inhuman or Degrading Treatment or Punishment was enforced and torture was legally recognized and defined for the first time

Quiroga and Deutsch began to treat clients in local clinics and in their own homes. Partnering with organizations such as Clinica Monseñor Oscar A. Romero, El Rescate, CARECEN and Amanecer, PTV quickly became well known in the Central American refugee community. Quiroga, having already been a volunteer at Venice Family Clinic for years, formed a partnership in which he was able to use their facilities to see PTV patients. Based in a small apartment at the time, Venice Family Clinic is now the largest community clinic in the U.S. and still home to PTV's medical office.

In 1994, PTV received its first grant from the United Nations Voluntary Fund for Victims of Torture and was incorporated as a 501 (c)3 non-profit organization. Several years later, in 2000, PTV received a federal grant for $2 million over a four-year period, allowing PTV to add staff and relocate the administrative office from Ms. Deutsch's home to downtown Los Angeles. With paid staff and a central office, PTV was finally able to expand its scope to include areas like research and evaluation.

== Demographics ==
According to a report by the U.S. Refugee Admissions Program (USRAP), 48,217 refugees were admitted into the U.S. in 2007. Of that total, 2,619 (5.43%) resettled in Florida, 2,978 (6.18%) relocated to New York and 6,699 (13.89%) chose to resettle in California; making the latter home to more incoming refugees than the next two states combined. Of all those who sought to make California their new home, 4,645 (69%) resettled in the five counties PTV serves - Los Angeles, Orange, Riverside, San Bernardino and Ventura. Out of all of the counties in California, The Los Angeles Federal Immigration Court had greatest number of asylum seekers with 4,064. Between 2002 and 2008, the L.A. Federal Immigration Court adjudicated the highest number of asylum applications of any immigration court in California with 69,172 cases - 63% of the state total. As states, Florida and New York had 75,499 and 73,746 applications for asylum, respectively; just a fraction more than L.A. County alone.

=== Client demographics ===
The demographic makeup of PTV's client population is ever-changing, as global, regional, and national sociopolitical dynamics are constantly in flux. Thus far, PTV has served clients from over 65 countries.

According to its 2024 Impact Report, the Program for Torture Victims served 358 clients during the year, consisting primarily of adult survivors of state-sponsored torture and persecution, as well as a smaller number of minors and older adults. Approximately 85.1% of clients were between the ages of 18 and 25, 8.6% were under 18, and 6.3% were aged 55 and older. The client population was 53% women and 47% men.

Clients originated from multiple regions worldwide, with 50% from Latin America, 30% from Africa, 14% from Eastern Europe, and 6% from Southeast Asia. The organization reported providing services in 34 languages, with Spanish, Armenian, French, Russian, and Luganda among the most commonly used.

The most frequently reported reasons for persecution included membership in a targeted social group (55%), political or social activism (44%), and ethnicity (11%). Reported forms of torture and abuse included psychological torture (84%), beatings (69%), rape or sexual violence (34%), wounding or maiming (28%), witnessing torture (25%), kidnapping or enforced disappearance (25%), and deprivation such as food, water, or sleep (23%).

Socioeconomic data indicated that 79% of clients were unemployed at intake, 81% lived below the federal poverty line, and 48% lacked health insurance. A majority of clients were diagnosed with trauma-related mental health conditions, including post-traumatic stress disorder (65%) and depression and anxiety (76%).

In recent years, PTV expanded services for undocumented and unaccompanied minors, including children and youth who arrived in the United States without legal guardians and had experienced violence, displacement, or exploitation prior to arrival.

== Services ==
The Program for Torture Victims (PTV) provides multidisciplinary rehabilitation services to individuals who have survived torture and persecution. Its model integrates clinical care, case management, legal support, and community-based support to address the complex needs of clients.

=== Psychological and Clinical Services ===
PTV offers trauma-informed psychological and clinical services, including psychological evaluation, individual and family therapy, psychiatric assessment, and ongoing therapeutic support. These services are intended to address trauma-related conditions and facilitate emotional recovery. Psychological evaluations and affidavits can be prepared for use in legal proceedings.

=== Case Management and Support Services ===
The organization provides case management to assist clients with navigating systems and accessing needed social services. These supports may include referrals for housing, employment assistance, interpreter services, transportation support, and emergency assistance for basic needs such as food and clothing. PTV also facilitates peer support groups and community-based activities to foster resilience and social connection.

=== Medical Care ===
PTV delivers trauma-responsive medical care through its own clinic and through partnerships with community healthcare providers. Services include primary medical evaluation, treatment of health conditions resulting from torture, and referrals for specialty care. The program may also provide education and consultation to healthcare professionals on best practices for treating torture survivors.

=== Legal Support and Assistance ===
PTV collaborates with legal professionals to assist clients in immigration proceedings, particularly asylum applications. Staff prepare forensic psychological and medical evaluations and may support clients as expert witnesses. The program also offers training for legal and judicial professionals on trauma-informed practices and the effects of torture.

=== Training and Community Education ===
In addition to direct services, PTV provides training and consultation to healthcare providers, attorneys, and other professionals on issues related to torture rehabilitation. It also engages in public education to raise awareness of the effects of torture and the challenges faced by survivors.

PTV also collaborates with local organizations to host public programs for events such as the United Nations International Day in Support of Victims of Torture.
