= Religious views on torture =

Internationally, nonreligious people are less likely to support the use of torture against suspected terrorists than Christians, Buddhists, Hindus, Jews, and the adherents of other religions. With the exception of Muslim/African cultures who are most opposed to the use of torture. Historically the Catholic Church, Islamic and Jewish law generally did not support the use of torture.

== Judaism ==
Torture has no presence within halakha (Jewish law). There did once exist a system of capital and corporal punishment in Judaism, as well as a flagellation statute for non-capital offences, but it was all abolished by the Sanhedrin during the Second Temple period.

Maimonides issued a ruling in the case of a man who was ordered by a beth din (religious court) to divorce his wife and refused that "we coerce him until he states 'I want to.'" This is only true in cases where specific grounds for the verdict exist. In the 1990s, some activist rabbis had interpreted this statement to mean that torture could be applied against husbands in troubled marriages in order to force them into granting gittin (religious divorces) to their wives. One such group, the New York divorce coercion gang, was broken up by the Federal Bureau of Investigation in 2013.

== Christianity ==
=== Roman Catholic Church ===
Throughout the Early Middle Ages, the Catholic Church generally opposed the use of torture during criminal proceedings. This is evident from a letter sent by Pope Nicholas I to Khan Boris of the Bulgars in AD 866, delivered in response to a series of questions from the former and concerned with the ongoing Christianisation of Bulgaria. Ad Consulta Vestra (as entitled in Latin) declared judicial torture to be a practice that was fundamentally contrary to divine law. The Pontiff made it a point of incontrovertible truth that, in his own words: "confession [to a crime] should be spontaneous, not compelled, and should not be elicited with violence but rather proffered voluntarily". He argued for an alternative and more humane procedure, in which the accused person would be required to swear an oath of innocence upon the "holy Gospel that he did not commit [the crime] which is laid against him and from that moment on the matter is [to be put] at an end". Nicholas likewise stressed in the same letter that "those who refuse to receive the good of Christianity and sacrifice and bend their knees to idols" were to be moved towards accepting the true faith "by warnings, exhortations, and reason rather than by force," emphasising to this end that "violence should by no means be inflicted upon them to make them believe. For everything which is not voluntary, cannot be good".

In the High Middle Ages, the church became increasingly concerned with the perceived threat posed to its existence by resurgent heresy, in particular, that attributed to a purported sect known as the Cathars. Catharism had its roots in the Paulician movement in Armenia and eastern Byzantine Anatolia and the Bogomils of the First Bulgarian Empire. Consequently, the church began to enjoin secular rulers to extirpate heresy (lest the ruler's Catholic subjects are absolved from their allegiance), and in order to coerce heretics or witnesses "into confessing their errors and accusing others," decided to sanction the use of methods of torture, already utilized by secular governments in other criminal procedures due to the recovery of Roman Law, in the medieval inquisitions. However, Pope Innocent IV, in the Bull Ad extirpanda (15 May 1252), stipulated that the inquisitors were to "stop short of danger to life or limb".

The modern church's views regarding torture have changed drastically, largely reverting to the earlier stance. In 1953, in an address to the 6th International Congress of Penal Law, Pope Pius XII approvingly reiterated the position of Pope Nicholas the Great over a thousand years before him, when his predecessor had unilaterally opposed the use of judicial torture, stating:

Preliminary juridical proceedings must exclude physical and psychological torture and the use of drugs: first of all, because they violate a natural right, even if the accused is indeed guilty, and secondly because all too often they give rise to erroneous results...About eleven hundred years ago, in 866, the great Pope Nicholas I replied in the following way to a question posed by a people which had just come into contact with Christianity: 'If a thief or a bandit is caught, and denies what is imputed to him, you say among you that the judge should beat him on the head with blows and pierce his sides with iron spikes, until he speaks the truth. That, neither divine nor human law admits: the confession must not be forced, but spontaneous; it must not be extorted, but voluntary; lastly, if it happens that, after having inflicted these sufferings, you discover absolutely nothing concerning that with which you have charged the accused, are you not ashamed then at least, and do you not recognize how impious your judgment was? Likewise, if the accused, unable to bear such tortures, admits to crimes which he has not committed, who, I ask you, has the responsibility for such an impiety? Is it not he who forced him to such a deceitful confession? Furthermore, if some one utters with his lips what is not in his mind, it is well known that he is not confessing, he is merely speaking. Put away these things, then, and hate from the bottom of your heart what heretofore you have had the folly to practice; in truth, what fruit did you then draw from that of which you are now ashamed?'

Who would not wish that, during the long period of time elapsed since then, justice had never laid this rule aside! The need to recall the warning given eleven hundred years ago is a sad sign of the miscarriages of juridical practice in the twentieth century.

Thus, the Catechism of the Catholic Church (published in 1994) condemns the use of torture as a grave violation of human rights. In No. 2297-2298 it states:

Torture, which uses physical or moral violence to extract confessions, punish the guilty, frighten opponents, or satisfy hatred is contrary to respect for the person and for human dignity... In times past, cruel practices were commonly used by legitimate governments to maintain law and order, often without protest from the Pastors of the Church, who themselves adopted in their own tribunals the prescriptions of Roman law concerning torture. Regrettable as these facts are, the Church always taught the duty of clemency and mercy. She forbade clerics to shed blood. In recent times it has become evident that these cruel practices were neither necessary for public order nor in conformity with the legitimate rights of the human person. On the contrary, these practices led to ones even more degrading. It is necessary to work for their abolition. We must pray for the victims and their tormentors.

=== Evangelical-Lutheran Churches ===
The Evangelical Lutheran Church in America has denounced torture. The Evangelical Lutheran Church in America led Ten Days of Prayer: Countdown to End Torture.

== Islam ==
The prevalent view among jurists of sharia law is that torture is not permitted under any circumstances.

== See also ==
- Christian vegetarianism
- Problem of Hell
