= Inge Genefke Award =

The Inge Genefke Award is granted every second year by the Anti-Torture Support Foundation to a person who has carried out particularly outstanding work against torture. Named after Dr. Inge Genefke, a Danish physician and trailblazer in the worldwide fight against torture, the award can not be applied for, but is given by the decision of the board of the Anti-Torture Support Foundation.

The Inge Genefke and Bent Sørensen Anti-Torture Support Foundation is a Nonprofit organization. Its purpose is to support work against torture, particularly by awarding the Inge Genefke award every two years to an exceptional individual that has carried out commendable work against the use of torture. The foundation has been established in recognition of the vital importance of the fight against torture and also with respect of the significant work by International Rehabilitation Council for Torture Victims founder Inge Genefke, MD, DMSc. h.c. and Professor Bent Sørensen, MD, DMSc.

== Recipients ==
- 2004: Professor Veli Løek, Izmir, Turkey
- 2006: International lawyer Mónica Feria-Tinta UK/Peru
- 2008: Frances Lovemore, M.D., Zimbabwe
- 2010: June Caridad Pagaduan-Lopez, Professor, M.D., The Philippines
- 2012: James Jaranson M.D. and José Quiroga, M.D., Chile
- 2014: Lilla Hárdi M.D., Hungary
