= Joe Navarro =

American writer, professional speaker, and former FBI agent (born 1953)

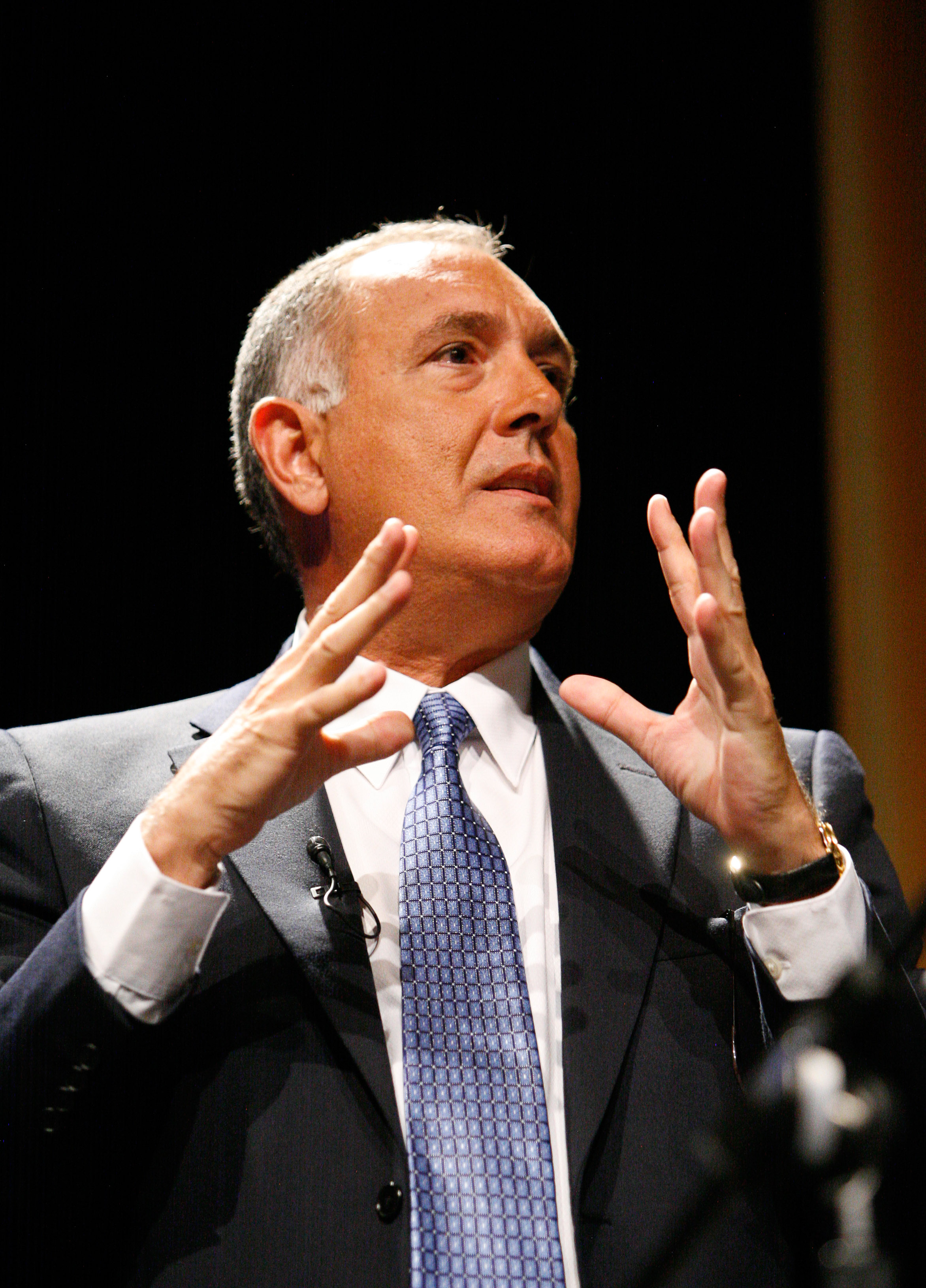
- Navarro in 2008
- Born: May 26, 1953 (age 73); Cienfuegos, Cuba
- Education: Brigham Young University (B.A.); Salve Regina University (M.A.)
- Occupations: Author; professional speaker; ex-FBI agent and supervisor
- Notable work: What Every Body Is Saying (2008) The Dictionary of Body Language (2018) Three Minutes to Doomsday (2017)
- Spouse: Thryth Hillary Navarro
- Website: jnforensics.com

Joe Navarro (born May 26, 1953) is a Cuban-born American author, public speaker, and former FBI agent and supervisor. Navarro specializes in the area of nonverbal communication and body language, and has authored numerous books, including What Every Body Is Saying, Dangerous Personalities, Louder Than Words, Three Minutes to Doomsday, and The Dictionary of Body Language.

== Background ==
Navarro moved to the US at age eight with his family shortly after the Bay of Pigs Invasion in Cuba. After earning a bachelor's degree in Justice Administration from Brigham Young University and a Master of Arts in International Relations from Slippery Rock University, he worked as an FBI special agent and supervisor in the area of counterintelligence and behavioral assessment for 25 years. He is one of the founding members of the FBI's elite Behavioral Analysis Program and he also served as a SWAT Team Commander and Bureau Pilot. Since retiring from the FBI, Navarro writes books and lectures to share his knowledge of human behavior. He is on the adjunct faculty at Saint Leo University and has lectured multiple times at the Harvard Business School. Since 2003, Navarro has been a consultant to the State Departments and is a fellow with the Institute for Intergovernmental Research.

In 2005, Navarro got involved in the World Series of Poker Academy, training players on poker tells after a chance meeting with Annie Duke on a Discovery Channel program about detecting lies.

Since 2009, Navarro has been a regular contributor to Psychology Today Magazine (Spycatcher blog) and in 2008 he wrote "Every Body's Talking" as a special for the Washington Post.

Navarro's book Three Minutes to Doomsday was published by Scribner, a division of Simon & Schuster. Smoke House Pictures, George Clooney and Grant Heslov's production company, has picked up the book, which is based on the work Navarro did as the FBI's top body language expert during the Cold War.

== Books ==
Navarro is the author of thirteen books. His best-known body language book, What Every Body is Saying, published in 2008, is an international bestseller available in 27 languages. His most recent book, The Dictionary of Body Language, came out in 2018. Navarro's book Louder Than Words was elected as one of Six Best Business Books to Read for Your Career in 2010 by Wall Street Journal's Digital Network, FINS. Navarro is also the author of Three Minutes to Doomsday, Hunting Terrorists, Advanced Interviewing Techniques, and Read 'Em and Reap, as well as a series of short booklets available as e-books, written exclusively for Amazon Kindle.

== Education initiatives ==
In 2009, Navarro partnered with Nightingale-Conant, the world's largest producer of self-improvement audio programs, and produced The Power of Body Language. He also launched an online course in 2009 to share his knowledge with others on how to observe, decode, and utilize nonverbals in their personal and professional life. This was undertaken for the benefit of those who could not travel to attend his seminars.

== Partial bibliography ==
- Schafer, John and Joe Navarro (2004) Advanced Interviewing Techniques; Proven Strategies for Law Enforcement, Military, and Security Personnel. Charles C. Thomas, Springfield, Illinois. ISBN 0-398-07444-5.
- Navarro, Joe (2005) Hunting Terrorists: A Look at The Psychopathology of Terror. Charles C. Thomas, Springfield, Illinois. ISBN 0-398-07594-8.
- Navarro, Joe (2006) Read 'Em and Reap. HarperCollins, Pub. ISBN 978-0-06-119859-5.
- Navarro, Joe (2008) What Every Body is Saying. HarperCollins, Pub. ISBN 978-0-06-143829-5.
- Navarro, Joe "Every Body's Talking," Special to Washington Post, June 24, 2008, F1.
- Navarro, Joe (2010) Louder Than Words: Take Your Career from Average to Exceptional with the Hidden Power of Nonverbal Intelligence. HarperCollins, Pub. ISBN 978-0-06-177139-2.
- Navarro, Joe (2014) Dangerous Personalities. Rodale Books, Pub. ISBN 978-1623361921
- Navarro, Joe (2017) Three Minutes to Doomsday: An Agent, a Traitor, and the Worst Espionage Breach in U.S. History. Scribner. ISBN 978-1501128271
- Navarro, Joe (2018) The Dictionary of Body Language: A Field Guide to Human Behavior. William Morrow. ISBN 978-0062846877
