= Murder of Jakob von Metzler =

Murder of 11-year old boy in Frankfurt, Germany

Thomas David Lukas Olsen
- Born: 11 April 1975 (age 51); Frankfurt am Main, West Germany
- Other name: Magnus Gäfgen
- Occupation: None
- Known for: Child murder
- Penalty: Life imprisonment

The murder of Jakob von Metzler was a German murder case. In 2002 11-year old Jakob von Metzler was kidnapped and murdered by the law student Magnus Gäfgen in Frankfurt. The following year, Gäfgen was convicted and sentenced to life imprisonment.

The case drew controversy over the fact that Gäfgen was threatened with torture during his interrogation by the police in order to save his victim's life. The European Court of Human Rights case of Gäfgen v. Germany has been widely discussed in debates on torture.

In January 2015, it became known that Gäfgen had changed his name to Thomas David Lukas Olsen, reportedly inspired by the fictional Danish criminal Egon Olsen.

== Kidnapping and murder of Jakob von Metzler ==
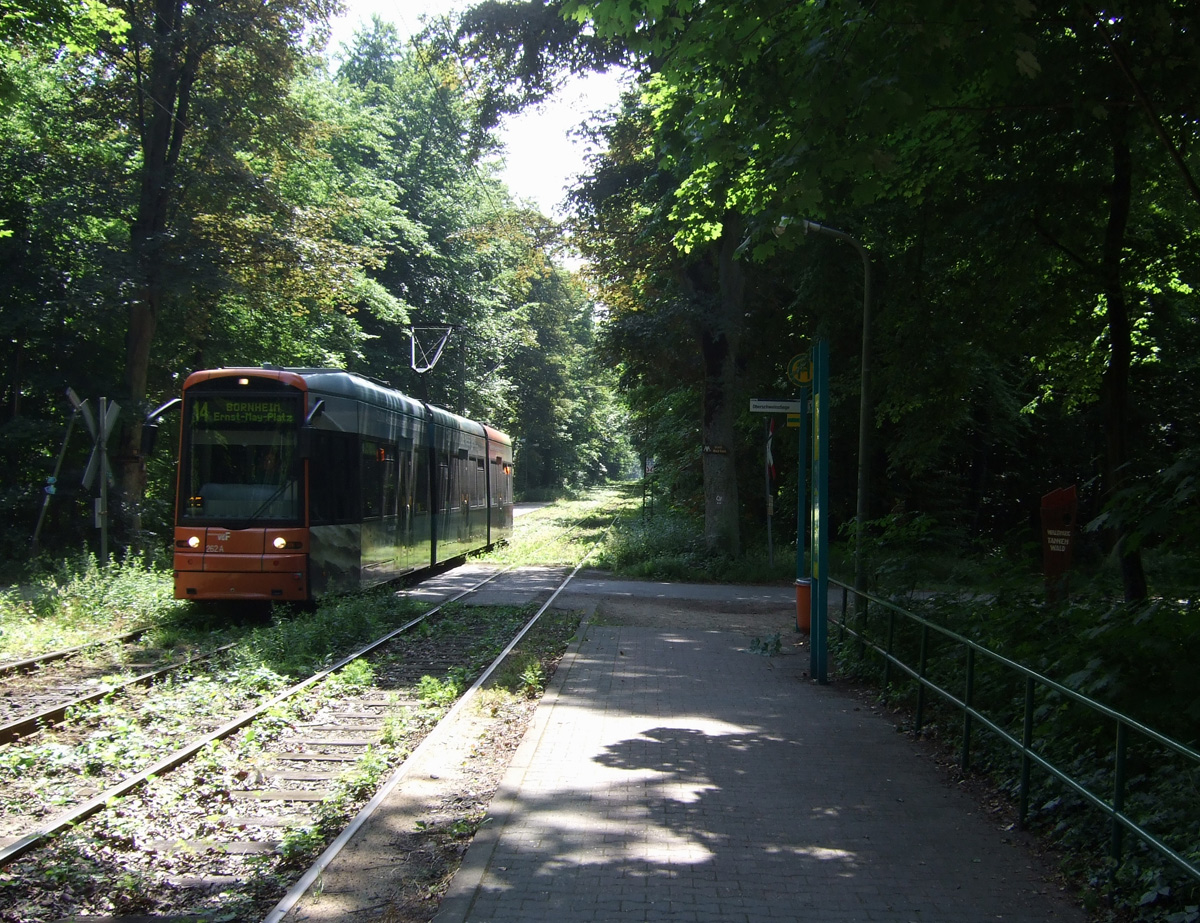
The Oberschweinstiege tram station in Frankfurt City Forest, where the transfer of the ransom money for kidnapped boy Jakob von Metzler took place

Gäfgen has a modest family background, but went on to study law at the Goethe University in 1996. On 27 September 2002 he kidnapped Jakob von Metzler in order to blackmail his parents, but killed him in his apartment. Gäfgen then demanded one million euro in ransom from the Metzlers, who were banking dynasts. He was observed by the police when he picked up the ransom. After a few hours, during which he had booked a holiday and not released his victim, who was already dead, he was arrested. After being threatened with torture, as ordered by Frankfurt Police Vice President Wolfgang Daschner, he confessed and told where the body was hidden.

=== Legal proceedings ===
In the conviction of Gäfgen for murder to life imprisonment in July 2003, the court established his grave level of guilt (besondere Schwere der Schuld). As a consequence, he was not eligible for early release after 15 years, as is otherwise usual for life prisoners. Gäfgen's appeal to the Federal Court of Justice was rejected in May 2004. His complaint to the Federal Constitutional Court was rejected in December 2004.

In December 2004 Frankfurt deputy police chief Wolfgang Daschner received a suspended sentence of a €10,800 fine for ordering a subordinate, Ortwin E., to threaten Gäfgen with torture. Ortwin E. was sentenced to a €3,600 fine.

In 2005, Gäfgen filed a complaint against Germany at the European Court of Human Rights (case no. 22978/05, Gäfgen v. Germany) which he partially won in 2010: Germany was found to have violated article 3 ECHR (Prohibition of torture and inhuman and degrading treatment), but was found not to have violated article 6 (Right to a fair trial). Additionally, he sued the state of Hessen and demanded compensation for allegedly suffering trauma after being threatened with torture, but lost the case.

In August 2011 Magnus Gäfgen was awarded €3,000 damages for the threats he endured from the police. Gäfgen originally wanted €10,000. His liquidator tried to seize the money.

=== Life in prison ===
Magnus Gäfgen is serving his life sentence in Schwalmstadt Prison in the state of Hesse. He passed the first state examination in law while in prison, and published the autobiography Allein mit Gott – Der Weg zurück (Alone with God – The way back) in 2005. His plans to establish a "Gäfgen Foundation" that should help children who had been victims of crime sparked controversy, and after authorities stated they would never allow such a foundation to be registered, he dropped the plans.

In 2017 he applied to be released on probation. In 2018 the authorities determined that he is still dangerous and rejected the application. After parole was rejected, the minimum prison sentence was set at 23 years, i.e. until September 2025.

== Film adaptations and documentaries ==
The murder case has been the subject of several film adaptations and documentaries. An episode of Tatort from 2005 was loosely based on the case. ARD produced the movie Eine Frage des Gewissens in 2006, while an episode in the ZDF series Kommissarin Lucas from that year was also based on the case. The documentary Der Mordfall Jakob von Metzler: Ein Verbrechen und seine Folgen was broadcast by ZDF in 2007 and an episode in the series Die großen Kriminalfälle was broadcast by ARD in 2008. In 2012 the feature film The Case of Jakob von Metzler was released. Gäfgen was portrayed by Johannes Allmayer.

== See also ==
- List of kidnappings
- List of solved missing person cases (post-2000)
- Ticking time bomb scenario

== Literature ==
- Adrienne Lochte: Sie werden dich nicht finden. Der Fall Jakob von Metzler. Droemer/Knaur 2004, ISBN 3-426-27345-4
- Magnus Gäfgen: Allein mit Gott – Der Weg zurück. Bendorf: Atlantic-Millenium-Press 2005, ISBN 3-00-017114-2
