= Interrogational torture =

Use of torture to obtain information in interrogation

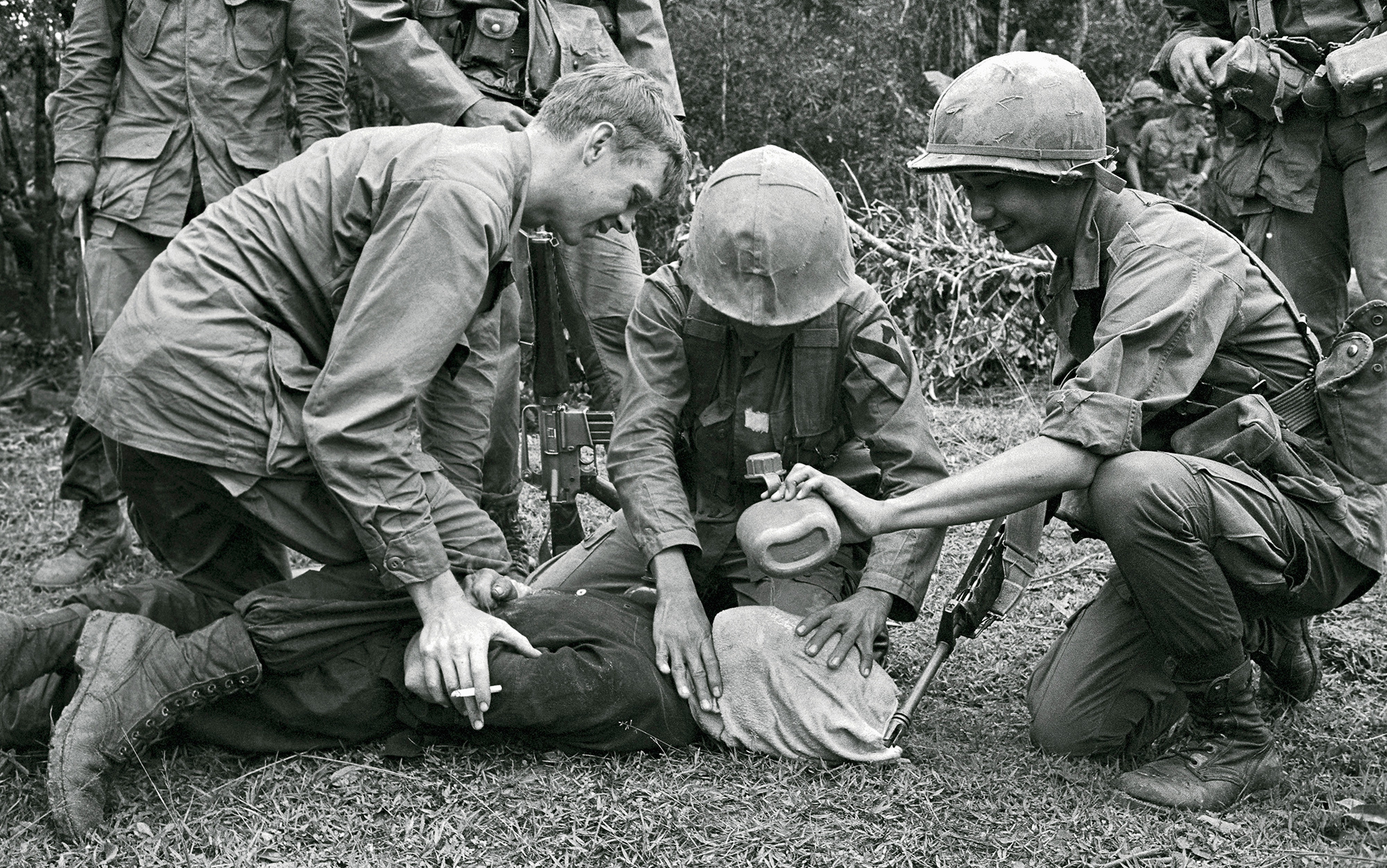
Two United States soldiers and one South Vietnamese soldier waterboard a captured North Vietnamese prisoner of war near Da Nang, 1968.

Interrogational torture is the use of torture to obtain information in interrogation, as opposed to the use of torture to extract a forced confession, regardless of whether it is true or false. Torture has been used throughout history during interrogation, although it is now illegal and a violation of international law.

Beyond torture's moral repugnance, most experts who study interrogation consider torture an ineffective and counterproductive means of gathering accurate information, because it frequently generates false or misleading information and impairs subsequent information collection.

== Investigation of effectiveness ==
Governments that have used torture for interrogation on a large scale have not disclosed systematic information on how their torture programs were carried out, hampering efforts to investigate their effectiveness by those who lack access to classified information. Young and Kearns state that "Experiments on whether or not torture is effective are extremely challenging to implement in a safe yet realistic way." Ethical research studies require the informed consent of participants, making it impossible to experiment with nonconsensual torture. In his book Why Torture Doesn't Work: The Neuroscience of Interrogation, neuroscientist Shane O'Mara argues that coercive interrogation and torture damage the areas of the brain that recall information. Although the CIA has argued that torture for information is a science, O'Mara argues that it is in fact pseudoscience.

The checkability of confessions remains an important issue for the effectiveness of torture, since both the interrogator and the subject know that a checkable confession is more likely to be true. Many torture survivors report revealing false or incomplete information since their goal was to satisfy the torturer and end the suffering, not to reveal information.

In 2007, evaluating the available scientific evidence on the effectiveness of torture, Darius Rejali concludes: "In short, organized torture yields poor information, sweeps up many innocents, degrades organizational capabilities, and destroys interrogators. Limited time during battle or emergency intensifies all these problems." Rejali acknowledges that it is possible that torture may yield useful information in some cases, but in general "torture is the clumsiest method available to organizations". According to a 2017 article in Journal of Strategic Studies, "scientific evidence, expert testimony, and the historical record show that coercive interrogation is not effective in eliciting reliable information from prisoners". A 2017 review in Psychological Perspectives on Interrogation asserts that "Psychological theory and research shows that harsh interrogation methods are ineffective."

Research on the history of torture suggests that torture has likely been costly and ineffective at extracting reliable information from reluctant detainees. In Toledo, Spain, the Spanish Inquisition interrogated 1046 people between 1575 and 1610. Of those who were not tortured, 42% confessed guilt. Of those who were tortured, 29% confessed.

During the Philippine War (1899–1902), Filipino detainees were subjected to "water torture". According to one Senate Committee testimony, about two-thirds of those tortured collaborated and revealed the locations of weapons caches. More recently in Iraq, Saddam Hussein ordered the torture of suspected regime opponents. Of the 31 detainees who later told scholars that they had indeed acted to undermine the regime, twelve (39%) also admitted that they had provided accurate information about their activities under torture. Nonetheless, Hassner argues that it is impossible to improvise quick and brutal torture and expect successful results: "Our society would have to acquiesce to a massive bureaucratized torture campaign, at times of peace or war, that targeted thousands, from all walks of life, regardless of culpability, to extract modest intelligence that was, at best, corroborative".

=== Techniques ===
Rejali states that the effectiveness of torture cannot be considered without investigating specific techniques and how they affect the victim's body and mind. In the 2010s, research began to examine specific techniques for their effects. For example, studies of sleep deprivation have found that there is a high risk of false statements or the interrogator even planting a false memory. O'Mara ran a study of simulated waterboarding, finding that it increased the recall of false memories. Charles A. Morgan III tested SERE techniques on volunteers and found that they reduced the reliability of eyewitness identification. Some research suggests that the greater number of coercive techniques that are applied, the greater likelihood of obtaining false information.

== Historical examples ==
=== Judicial use ===
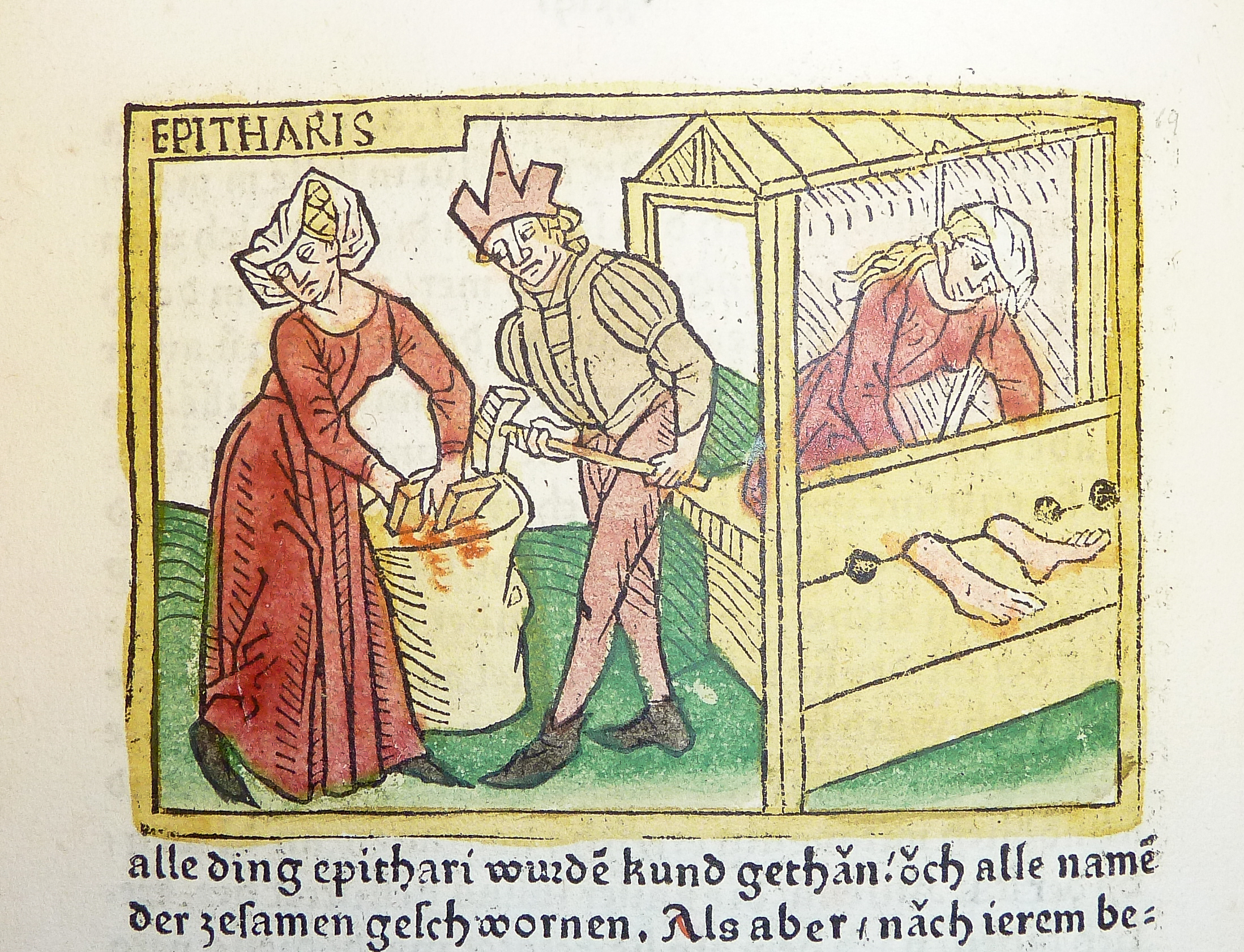
Illustration of the torture of Epicharis, a freedwoman implicated in the 1st-century-BC Pisonian conspiracy against Nero. Image from a 15th-century woodcut.

Torture was routinely used for interrogation in ancient Greek and Roman law and in medieval Roman law, but not in ancient Hebrew or medieval English law. It was argued that torture could be relied on at least in cases where the result could be checked (for example, if the accused confessed to burying the murder weapon under a certain tree, the judge should send someone to dig it up). Slaves could testify only under torture, supposedly because a loyal slave would not otherwise betray his/her master. But confessions under torture were believed in a wide range of uncheckable cases, such as heresy and witchcraft.

=== Military use ===
==== World War II ====
After the atomic bombing of Hiroshima during World War II, the Japanese secret police tortured a captured American P-51 fighter pilot, Marcus McDilda, to discover how many atomic bombs the Allies had and what the future targets were. McDilda, who had originally told his captors he knew nothing about the atomic bomb (and who indeed knew nothing about nuclear fission), falsely "confessed" under further torture that the US had 100 atomic bombs and that Tokyo and Kyoto were the next targets.

Interrogation was the source of only a subset of the Gestapo's intelligence; it heavily relied on voluntary denunciations and use of informers. The Gestapo tortured leaders of several national resistance movements but most did not break.

==== 1992 US Army Field Manual ====
FM 34-52 Intelligence Interrogation, the United States Army field manual, explains that torture "is a poor technique that yields unreliable results, may damage subsequent collection efforts, and can induce the source to say what he thinks the interrogator wants to hear."

==== War on Terror and 2003 invasion of Iraq ====
The U.S. Senate Report on the CIA's use of torture during the War on Terror.

False information about a link between Saddam Hussein and al-Qaeda was extracted from Ibn al-Shaykh al-Libi through torture and was cited by the George W. Bush administration in the months preceding its 2003 invasion of Iraq. That information was frequently repeated by members of the Bush administration, although reports from both the Central Intelligence Agency (CIA) and the Defense Intelligence Agency (DIA) strongly questioned its credibility, suggesting that al-Libi was "intentionally misleading" interrogators. The CIA Inspector General's 2004 Special Review of Counterterrorism, Detention and Interrogation Activities does not support the position that torture is effective for interrogation.

Since the revelations in 2004 and 2008 that the President George W. Bush administration authorized the use of torture in interrogations, and that United States personnel have used such practices in interrogations related to the 9/11 attacks and al-Qaeda, both at black sites and at Guantánamo Bay detention camp, discussions on the topic have been heated. In commenting on the use and effectiveness of various torture methods, with a focus on waterboarding, former U.S. Director of National Intelligence, Dennis C. Blair, wrote in 2009 that "high value information came from interrogations in which these methods were used". However, a Senate Committee that investigated claims of useful information being extracted from suspects that underwent enhanced interrogation concluded that critical and valuable information was not obtained using these methods. The 6,700-page Senate Intelligence Committee report on CIA torture also concluded that the CIA had repeatedly and deliberately impeded oversight and misrepresented the effectiveness of torture as an interrogation technique to policymakers and to the public through coordinated leaking of false information.

== Public opinion ==
Many people believe that torture works, or that it can even provide a silver bullet in counterterrorism efforts. The TV show 24 depicted torture as effective, increasing support for torture among Americans. Research indicates that some Americans will support torture if they believe it is effective, but also a non-negligible number will support torture even if they do not perceive it as an effective source of intelligence. The 2012 film Zero Dark Thirty, depicting the manhunt for Osama bin Laden, was criticized by some journalists for portraying torture as effective and key in gaining intelligence that led to the discovery of bin Laden's compound.

Public opinion on the use of torture for interrogation varies widely, with the lowest support recorded in West European countries and the highest support found in Turkey and South Korea (where most respondents supported the use of torture for interrogation) as well as in Kenya, Nigeria, and India among 31 countries surveyed between 2006 and 2008. A 2016 ICRC survey of 16 nations found that support for torture to obtain military information was highest in Israel, Nigeria, the US, and Iraq, and lowest in Yemen, Colombia, Switzerland, and China. A study by Jeremy D. Mayer, Naoru Koizumi, and Ammar Anees Malik found that opposition to the usage of torture in interrogation was correlated with stronger political rights but not economic development or the threat of terrorism. According to one study, people who believe torture is inherently immoral are more likely to believe it is ineffective.

== See also ==
- Rubber-hose cryptanalysis
- Forced confession
- Ticking time bomb scenario
- Inquisition
