= Charles Morgan =

Charles Morgan may refer to:

== Politicians ==
- Sir Charles Morgan, 1st Baronet (1726–1806), member of parliament (MP) for Brecon, 1778–1787, and Breconshire, 1787–1806
- Charles Morgan (Breconshire MP, born 1736) (1736–1787), member of parliament for Brecon, 1763–1769
- Sir Charles Morgan, 2nd Baronet (1760–1846), member of parliament for Brecon, 1787–1796, and Monmouthshire, 1796–1831
- Charles Morgan, 1st Baron Tredegar (1792–1875), MP for Brecon, 1812–1818, 1830–1832 and 1835–1847
- Octavius Morgan (Charles Octavius Swinnerton Morgan, 1803–1888), British politician, historian and antiquary; MP for Monmouthshire, 1841–1874
- Charles Rodney Morgan (1828–1854), British member of parliament for Brecon
- Charles H. Morgan (politician) (1842–1912), US congressman from Missouri
- Charles Morgan (Australian politician) (1897–1967), Australian politician

== Sportsmen ==
- Charles Morgan (Surrey cricketer) (1839–1904), English cricketer
- Charles Morgan (Queensland cricketer) (1877–1942), Australian cricketer
- Charles Morgan (coach) (c. 1890–19??), American football coach in the United States
- Charles Morgan (Victoria cricketer) (1900–1965), Australian cricketer
- Charles Morgan (Nottinghamshire cricketer) (1917–2001), English cricketer
- Charles Morgan (racing driver), American racing driver, see 2007 Rolex Sports Car Series season
- Charles Morgan (hurdler) (born 1918), winner of the 110 m hurdles at the 1945 USA Outdoor Track and Field Championships

== Military ==
- Charles Morgan (military governor) (c. 1575–1643), military governor of Bergen op Zoom
- Charles Morgan (East India Company officer) (1741–1818), Commander-in-Chief, India
- Charles Morgan (American soldier) (1745–1803), spy during the Revolutionary War
- Charles W. Morgan (naval officer) (1790–1853), officer in the United States Navy during the War of 1812
- Charles Hale Morgan (1834–1875), American Civil War general
- Sir Charles Eric Morgan (1889–1951), Royal Navy officer

== Other people ==
- Charles Morgan (Master of Clare College, Cambridge) (1678–1736), Master of Clare 1726–1736
- Charles Morgan (businessman) (1795–1878), American railroad and shipping magnate
- Charles Waln Morgan (1796–1861), whaling industry executive, banker and businessman
- Charles Hill Morgan (1831–1911), American mechanical engineer and inventor
- Charles Eldridge Morgan Jr. (1844–1917), co-founded the law firm Morgan Lewis.
- Charles Langbridge Morgan (engineer) (1855–1940), British civil engineer
- Charles Langbridge Morgan (1894–1958), English critic, novelist and playwright
- Charles Morgan (actor) (1909–1994), Welsh actor
- Charles Morgan Jr. (1930–2009), U.S. civil rights attorney
- Charles Morgan (automaker) (born 1951), ex-MD of Morgan Motor Company
- Charlie Morgan (musician) (born 1955), English drummer and percussionist
- Charles A. Morgan III, American psychiatrist
- Charles C. Morgan (1938–1977), American escrow agent killed by a gunshot

== Ships ==
- Charles W. Morgan (ship), an American whaling ship, named for Charles Waln Morgan

== See also ==
- Charlie Morgan (disambiguation)
