= Torture =

Deliberate infliction of suffering on a person

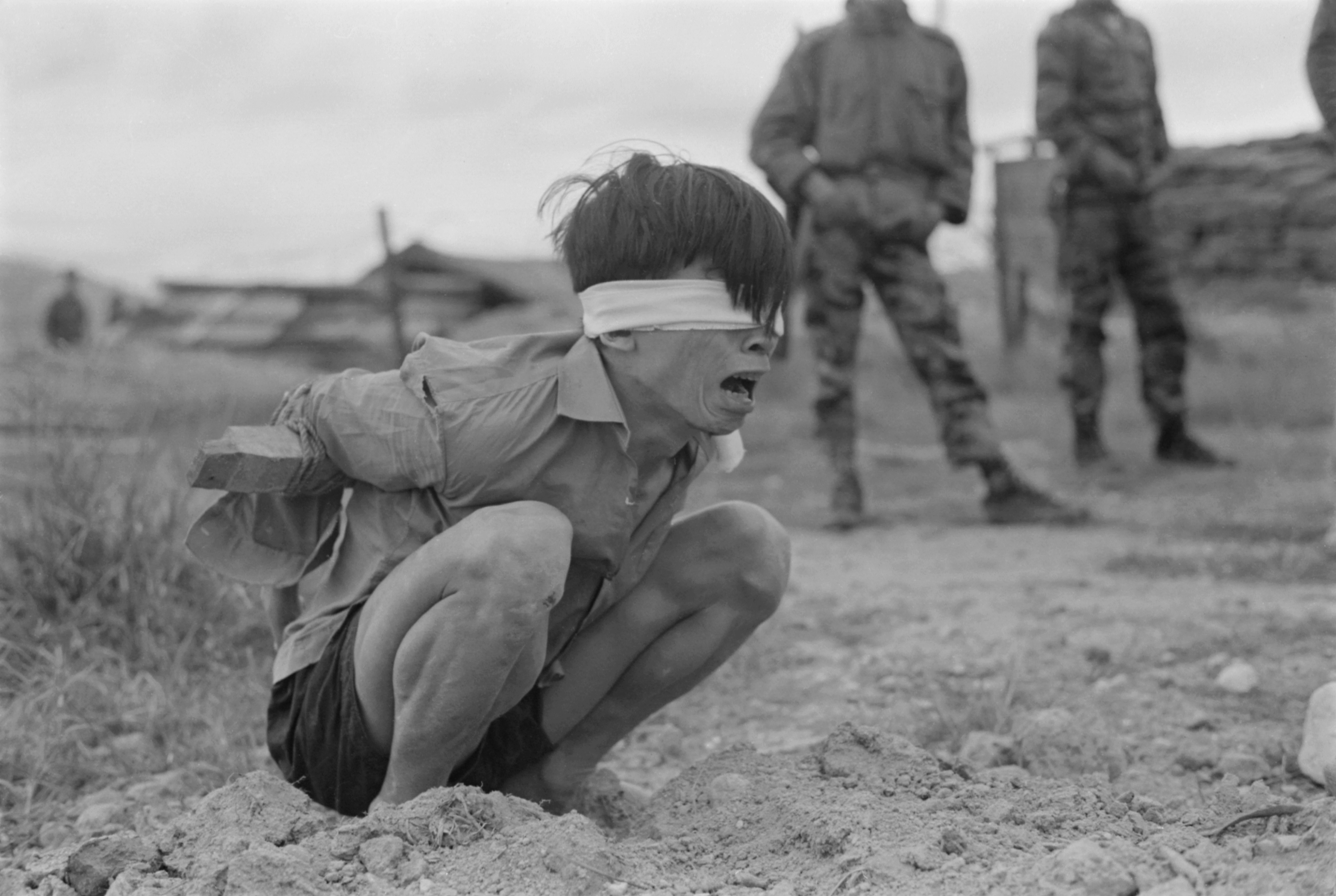
Captured Viet Cong soldier, blindfolded and tied in a stress position by American forces during the Vietnam War, 1967

Torture is the deliberate infliction of severe pain or suffering on a person for reasons including punishment, extracting a confession, interrogation for information, or intimidating third parties.

Some definitions restrict torture to acts carried out by the state, while others include non-state actors. Most victims of torture are poor and marginalized people suspected of crimes, although torture against political prisoners, or during armed conflict, has received disproportionate attention. Judicial corporal punishment and capital punishment are sometimes seen as forms of torture, but this label is internationally controversial. A variety of methods of torture are used, often in combination; the most common form of physical torture is beatings. Beginning in the twentieth century, many torturers have preferred non-scarring or psychological methods to maintain deniability.

Torturers more commonly act out of fear, or due to limited resources, rather than sadism. Although most torturers are thought to learn about torture techniques informally and rarely receive explicit orders, they are enabled by organizations that facilitate and encourage their behavior. Once a torture program begins, it usually escalates beyond what is intended initially and often leads to involved agencies losing effectiveness. Torture aims to break the victim's will, destroy their agency and personality, and is cited as one of the most damaging experiences that a person can undergo. Many victims suffer both physical damage—chronic pain is particularly common—and mental sequelae. Although torture survivors have some of the highest rates of post-traumatic stress disorder, many are psychologically resilient.

Torture has been carried out since ancient times. However, in the eighteenth and nineteenth centuries, many Western countries abolished the official use of torture in the judicial system, although it continued to be used throughout the world. Public opinion research shows general opposition to torture. It is prohibited under international law for all states under all circumstances and is explicitly forbidden by several treaties. Opposition to torture stimulated the formation of the human rights movement after World War II, and it continues to be an important human rights issue. Although prevention efforts have been of mixed effectiveness, institutional reforms and the elimination of incommunicado detention have had positive effects. Despite its decline, torture is still practiced in or by most countries.

== Definitions ==
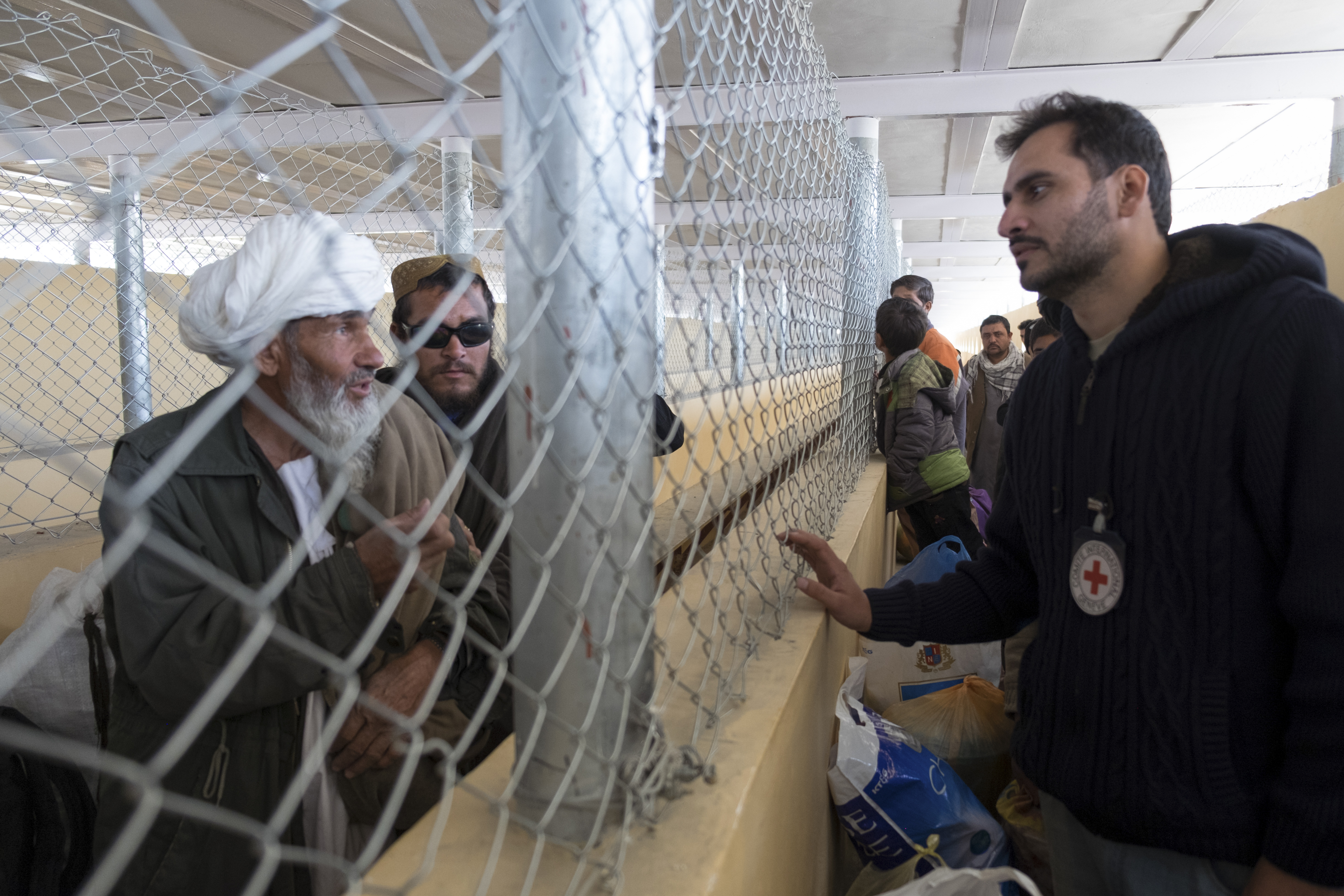
While solitary confinement, life imprisonment without the prospect of parole, and corporal punishment have been challenged, imprisonment itself escapes scrutiny despite evidence it is harmful.

Torture (Note: From Middle Latin tortura: 'pain inflicted by judicial or ecclesiastical authority as a means of persuasion', ultimately from a Latin root meaning 'to twist'.) is conventionally understood as the deliberate infliction of severe pain or suffering on a helpless person under the control of a perpetrator. The generally accepted components of the definition of torture are as follows:

- It is widely accepted that torture must be inflicted deliberately and for a purpose, but this is usually inclusive of any motivation except negligence or justified purposes.
- While the United Nations Convention against Torture definition requires that torture be perpetrated or enabled by "a public official or other person acting in an official capacity", some legal systems add non-state armed groups and organized crime. The most expansive definitions encompass anyone as a potential perpetrator. Over time, courts have begun to move away from state-centric views of torture by holding the state responsible for failing to prevent and punish torture by third parties.
- Torture is often described as occurring when the victim is powerless and under the control of the perpetrator, which can help distinguish it from legitimate use of force. The use as a defining characteristic of torture is more controversial because it can be claimed that the victim was not entirely powerless, particularly in non-traditional torture situations occurring outside of detention.
- The threshold of severity at which treatment can be classified as torture is the most controversial aspect of its definition; the interpretation of torture has broadened over time. The subjective elements of the definition of torture open room for legal evolution broaden the prohibition of torture, but on the other hand can be used to justify tortuous practices (for example, the United States government argued that waterboarding is not torture).

Depending on the definition used, torture may be distinguished from cruel, inhuman, or degrading treatment (CIDT) by the severity or the purpose. The definition of torture excludes and can be seen to legitimize other forms of pain, suffering, and degradation, particularly institutionalized, collective, and structural violence, while legal scholar Ergün Cakal argues that violent practices come to be recognized as torture after they no longer serve the purpose of the state.

== History ==
=== Pre-abolition ===
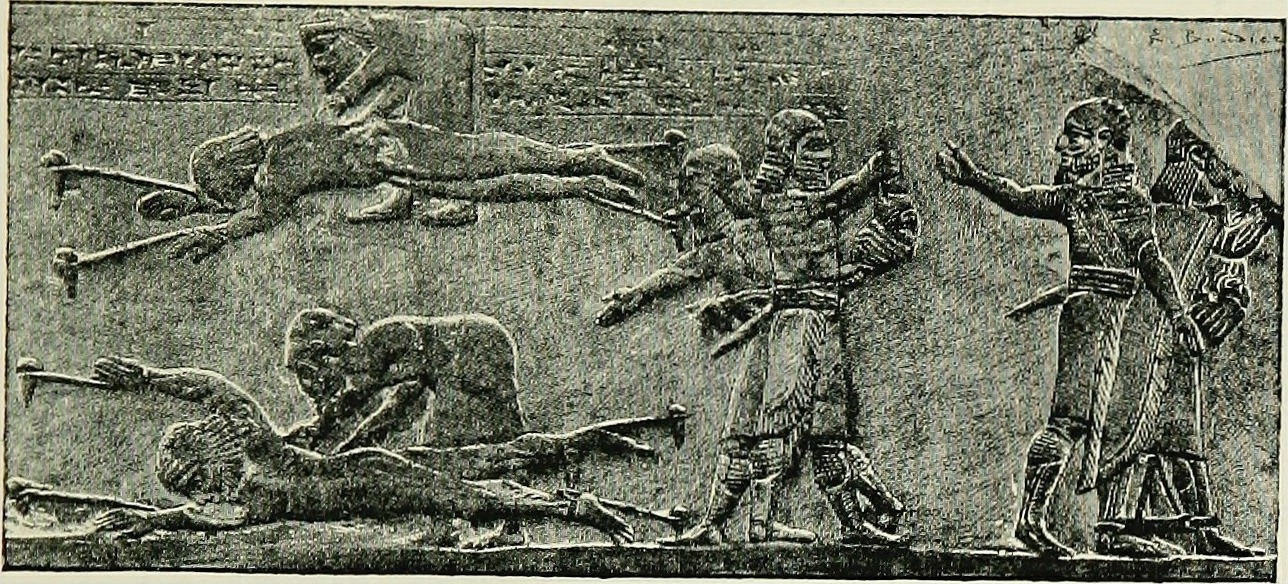
Two Elamite chiefs flayed alive after the Battle of Ulai, Assyrian relief

Torture was legally and morally acceptable in most ancient, medieval, and early modern societies. Societies used torture as part of the judicial process, and painful punishments were distinguished from torture. Historically, torture was seen as a reliable way to elicit the truth, a suitable punishment, and deterrence against future offenses. When torture was legally regulated, there were restrictions on the allowable methods. In most societies, citizens could be judicially tortured only under exceptional circumstances and for a serious crime such as treason, often only when some evidence already existed. In contrast, non-citizens such as foreigners and slaves were commonly tortured.

There is archaeological evidence of torture in Early Neolithic Europe, about 7,000 years ago. Torture is commonly mentioned in historical sources on Assyria and Achaemenid Persia. Torture was rare in early medieval Europe but became more common between 1200 and 1400. Torture was still a labor-intensive process reserved for the most severe crimes; most torture victims were men accused of murder, treason, or theft. The Ottoman Empire and Qajar Iran used torture in cases where circumstantial evidence tied someone to a crime, although Islamic law traditionally considered confessions made under torture to be invalid.

=== Abolition and continued use ===
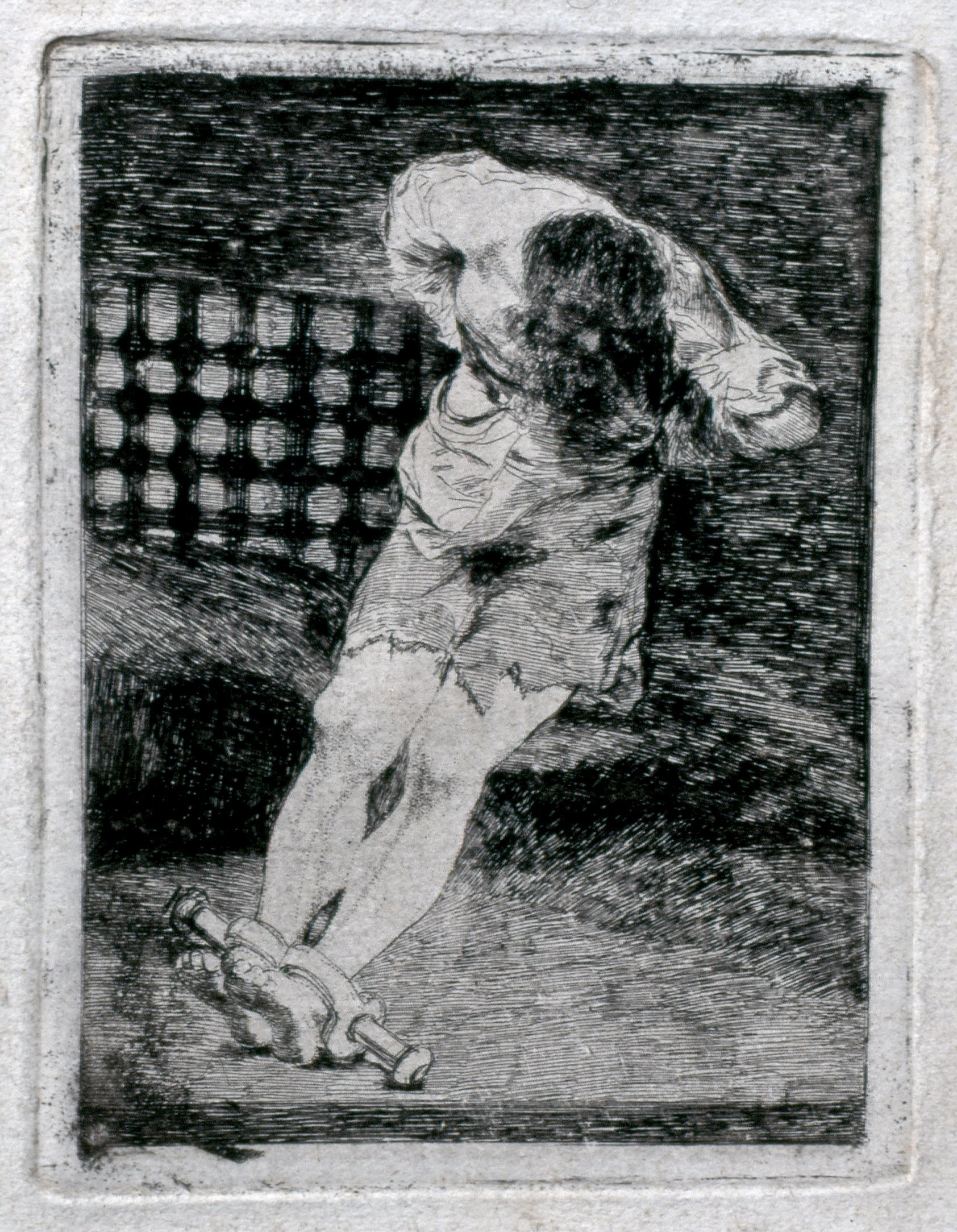
"The custody of a criminal does not require torture" by Francisco Goya, c. 1812

Torture remained legal in Europe during the seventeenth century, but its practice declined. Torture was already of marginal importance to European criminal justice systems by the time of its formal abolition in the 18th and early 19th centuries. Theories for why torture was abolished include Enlightenment ideas about the value of the human person, the lowering of the standard of proof in criminal cases, popular views that no longer saw pain as morally redemptive, and the expansion of imprisonment as an alternative to executions or painful punishments.

It is not known whether torture also declined in non-Western states or European colonies during the nineteenth century. In China, judicial torture, which had been practiced for more than two millennia, was banned in 1905 along with flogging and lingchi (dismemberment) as a means of execution, although torture in China continued throughout the twentieth and twenty-first centuries.

Torture was widely used by colonial powers to subdue resistance and reached a peak during the anti-colonial wars in the twentieth century. An estimated 300,000 people were tortured during the Algerian War (1954–1962), and the United Kingdom and Portugal also used torture in attempts to retain their respective empires. Independent states in Africa, the Middle East, and Asia often used torture in the twentieth century, but it is unknown whether their use of torture increased or decreased compared to nineteenth-century levels. During the first half of the twentieth century, torture became more prevalent in Europe with the advent of secret police, World War I and World War II, and communist and fascist states. Torture was used by both communist and anti-communist governments during the Cold War in Latin America, with an estimated 100,000 to 150,000 victims of torture by United States–backed regimes. The only countries in which torture was rare during the twentieth century were the liberal democracies of the West, where torture was used against ethnic minorities or criminal suspects from marginalized classes, and during overseas wars against foreign populations.

== Prevalence ==
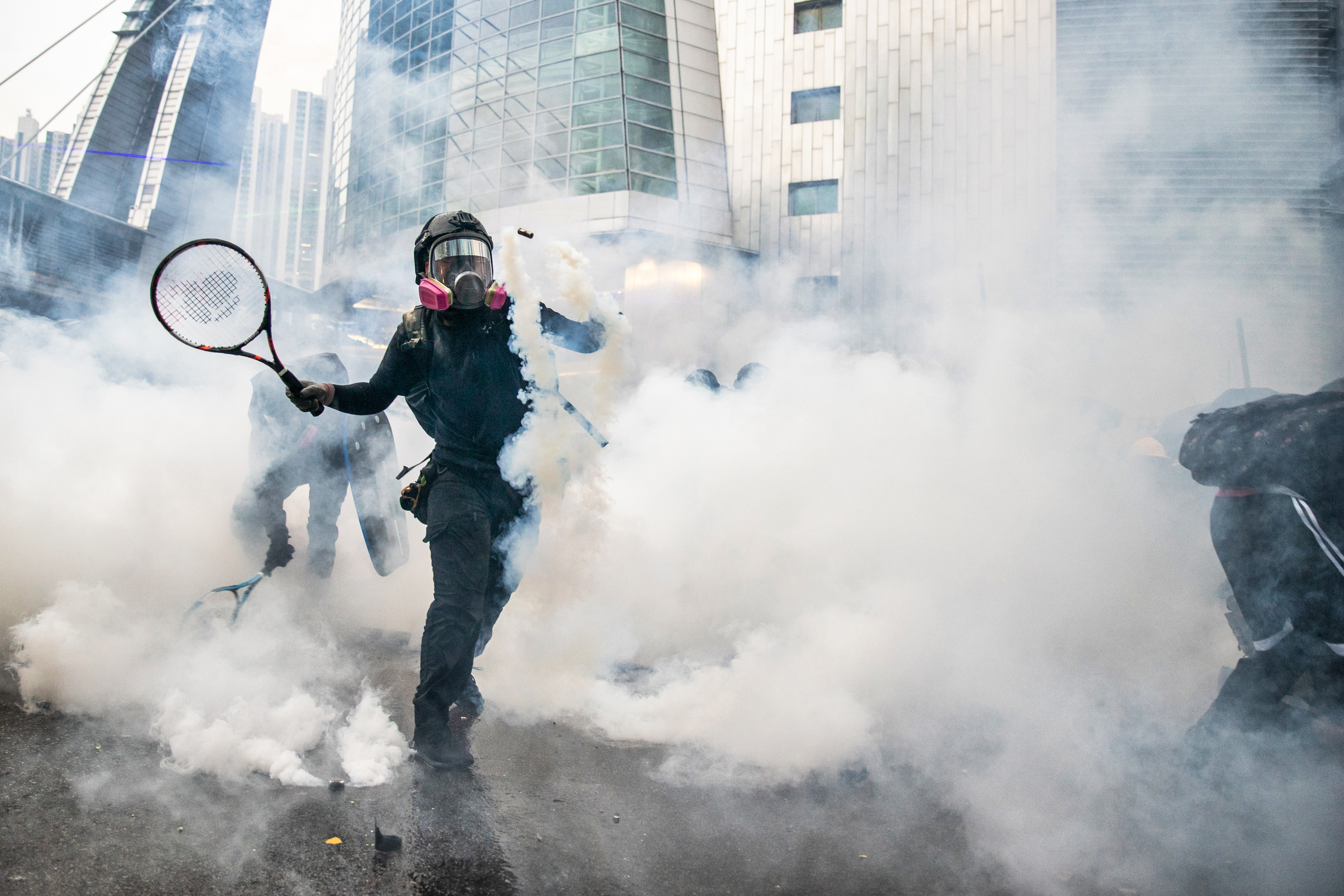
Tear gas used during the 2019–2020 Hong Kong protests. The use of tear gas on protestors is sometimes considered a form of torture.

Most countries practice torture, although few acknowledge it. Despite one of the most unambiguous and absolute prohibitions known to international law, torture continues to be more or less openly practiced in some states; others have changed which techniques are used and denied, covered up, or outsourced torture programs. Measuring the rate at which torture occurs is difficult because it is typically committed in secrecy, and abuses are more likely to come to light in open societies where there is a commitment to protecting human rights. Many torture survivors, especially those from poor or marginalized populations, are unwilling to report. Monitoring has focused on police stations and prisons, although torture can also occur in other facilities such as immigration detention and youth detention centers. Torture that occurs outside of custody—including extrajudicial punishment, intimidation, and crowd control—has traditionally not been counted, even though some studies have suggested it is more common than torture in places of detention. There is even less information on the prevalence of torture before the twentieth century. Although it is often assumed that men suffer torture at a higher rate than women, there is a lack of evidence. Some quantitative research has estimated that torture rates are either stagnant or increasing over time, but this may be a measurement effect.

Although liberal democracies are less likely to abuse their citizens, they may practice torture against marginalized citizens and non-citizens to whom they are not democratically accountable. Voters may support violence against out-groups seen as threatening; majoritarian institutions are ineffective at preventing torture against minorities or foreigners. Torture is more likely when a society feels threatened because of wars or crises, but studies have not found a consistent relationship between the use of torture and terrorist attacks.

Torture is directed against certain segments of the population, who are denied the protection against torture given to others. Torture of political prisoners and torture during armed conflicts receive more attention compared to torture of the poor or criminal suspects. Most victims of torture are suspected of crimes; a disproportionate number of victims are from poor or marginalized communities. Groups especially vulnerable to torture include unemployed young men, the urban poor, LGBTQ people, refugees and migrants, ethnic and racial minorities, indigenous people, and people with disabilities. Relative poverty and the resulting inequality in particular leave poor people vulnerable to torture. Criminalization of the poor, through laws targeting homelessness, sex work, or working in the informal economy, can lead to violent and arbitrary policing. Routine violence against poor and marginalized people is often not seen as torture, and its perpetrators justify the violence as a legitimate policing tactic; victims lack the resources or standing to seek redress.

== Perpetrators ==
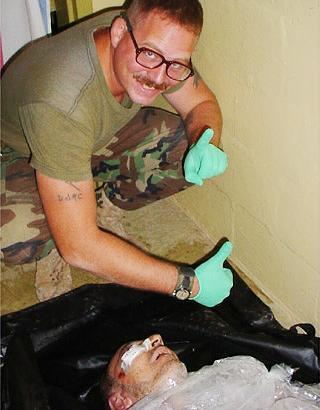
Charles Graner poses over Manadel al-Jamadi's corpse, after he was tortured to death by military police during detainment in Iraq.

Since most research has focused on torture victims, less is known about the perpetrators of torture. Many torturers see their actions as serving a higher political or ideological goal that justifies torture as a legitimate means of protecting the state. Fear is often the motivation for torture, and it is typically not a rational response as it is usually ineffective or even counterproductive at achieving the desired aim. Torture victims are often viewed by the perpetrators as severe threats and enemies of the state. Studies of perpetrators do not support the common assumption that they are psychologically pathological. Most perpetrators do not volunteer to be torturers; many have an innate reluctance to employ violence, and rely on coping mechanisms, such as alcohol or drugs. Psychiatrist Pau Pérez-Sales finds that torturers act from a variety of motives such as ideological commitment, personal gain, group belonging, avoiding punishment, or avoiding guilt from previous acts of torture.

In contrast to the assumption that torture is ordered at the highest levels of government, the approval or acquiescence of superiors is a necessary but not sufficient condition for torture to occur, given that a specific order to torture rarely can be identified. In many cases, a combination of dispositional and situational effects lead a person to become a torturer. In most cases of systematic torture, the torturers were desensitized to violence by being exposed to physical or psychological abuse during training which can be a deliberate tactic to create torturers. Even when not explicitly ordered by the government to torture, perpetrators may feel peer pressure due to competitive masculinity. Elite and specialized police units are especially prone to torturing, perhaps because of their tight-knit nature and insulation from oversight. Although some torturers are formally trained, most are thought to learn about torture techniques informally.

Torture can be a side effect of a broken criminal justice system in which underfunding, lack of judicial independence, or corruption undermines effective investigations and fair trials. In this context, people who cannot afford bribes are likely to become victims of torture. Understaffed or poorly trained police are more likely to resort to torture when interrogating suspects. In some countries, such as Kyrgyzstan, suspects are more likely to be tortured at the end of the month because of performance quotas.

The contribution of bureaucracy to torture is under-researched and poorly understood. Torturers rely on both active supporters and those who ignore it. Military, intelligence, psychology, medical, and legal professionals can all be complicit in torture. Incentives can favor the use of torture on an institutional or individual level, and some perpetrators are motivated by the prospect of career advancement. Bureaucracy can diffuse responsibility for torture and help perpetrators excuse their actions. Maintaining secrecy is often essential to maintaining a torture program, which can be accomplished in ways ranging from direct censorship, denial, or mislabeling torture as something else, to offshoring abuses to outside a state's territory. Along with official denials, torture is enabled by moral disengagement from the victims and impunity for the perpetrators. Public demand for decisive action against crime or even support for torture against criminals can facilitate its use.

Once a torture program is begun, it is difficult or impossible to prevent it from escalating to more severe techniques and expanding to larger groups of victims, beyond what is originally intended or desired by decision-makers. Sociologist Christopher J. Einolf argues that "torture can create a vicious cycle in which a fear of internal enemies leads to torture, torture creates false confessions, and false confessions reinforce torturers' fears, leading to a spiral of paranoia and ever-increasing torture"—similar to a witch hunt. Escalation of torture is especially difficult to contain in counterinsurgency operations. Torture and specific techniques spread between different countries, especially by soldiers returning home from overseas wars, although this process is poorly understood.

== Purpose ==
=== Punishment ===
Torture for punishment dates back to antiquity and is still employed in the twenty-first century. A common practice in countries with dysfunctional justice systems or overcrowded prisons is for police to apprehend suspects, torture them, and release them without a charge. Such torture could be performed in a police station, the victim's home, or a public place. In South Africa, the police have been observed handing suspects over to vigilantes to be tortured. This type of extrajudicial violence is often carried out in public as a form of social control to deter others. It discriminatorily targets minorities and marginalized groups and may be supported by the public, especially if people do not trust the official justice system.

Judicial corporal punishment was initially excepted from the UN definition of torture, which "does not include pain or suffering arising only from, inherent in or incidental to lawful sanctions", although it is explicitly prohibited under the Geneva Conventions. From the 1990s, courts increasingly recognized it as a form of torture, although this norm has met opposition from practitioners of Islamic law and other traditional justice practices. Capital punishment is an extreme form of corporal punishment and its use has become increasingly circumscribed. Certain methods of execution have been banned as tortuous, and the psychological harm of capital punishment has also been recognized as torture. Others do not consider corporal punishment with a fixed penalty to be torture, as it does not seek to break the victim's will.

=== Deterrence ===
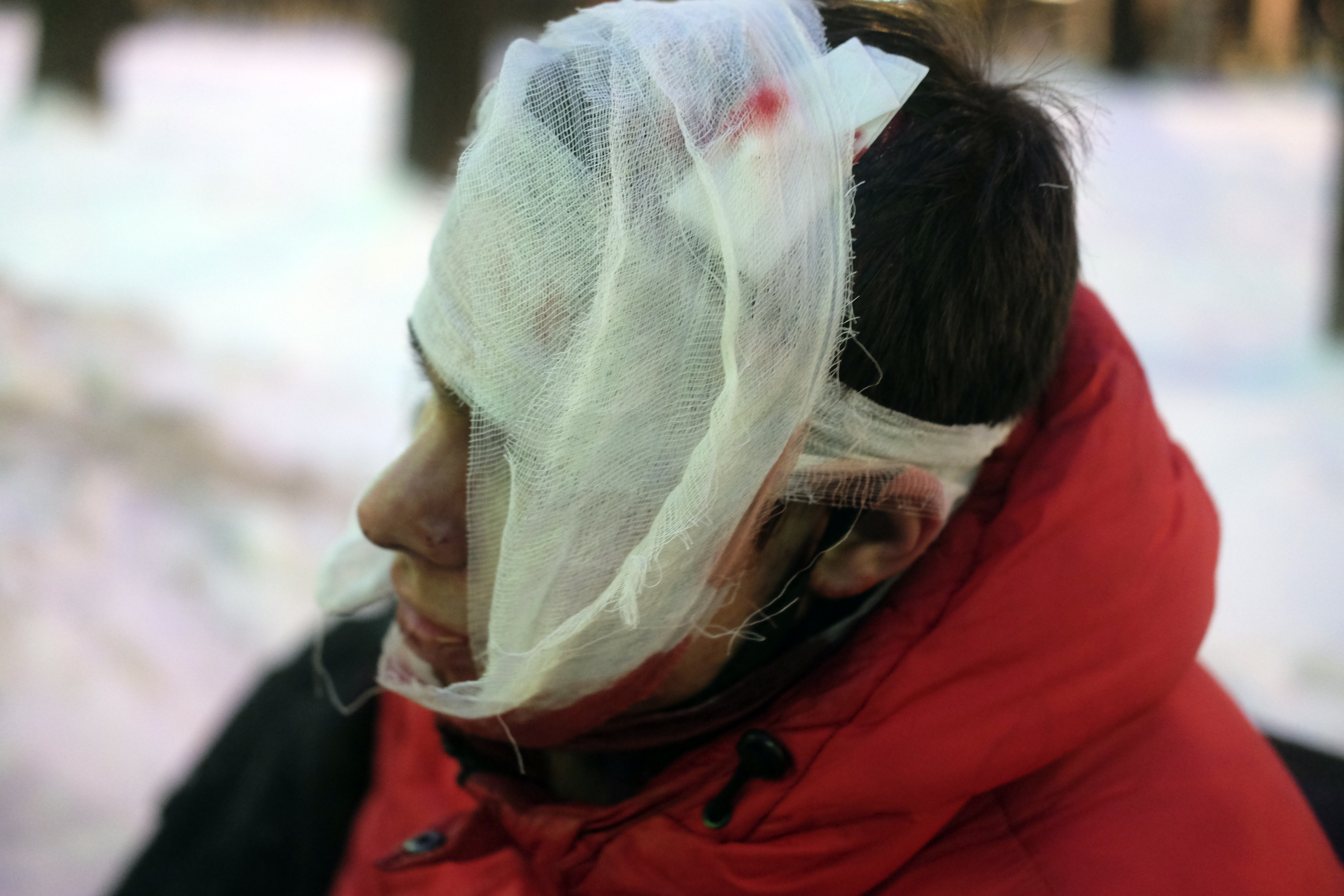
Russian pro-Navalny protestor injured by riot police

Torture may also be used indiscriminately to terrorize people other than the direct victim or to deter opposition to the government. In the United States, torture was used to deter slaves from escaping or rebelling. Some defenders of judicial torture prior to its abolition argued that it deterred crime; reformers contended that because torture was carried out in secret, it could not be an effective deterrent. Authoritarian regimes often resort to indiscriminate repression because they cannot accurately identify potential opponents. Many insurgencies lack the necessary infrastructure for a torture program and instead intimidate by killing. Research has found that state torture can extend the lifespan of terrorist organizations, increase incentives for insurgents to use violence, and radicalize the opposition.

In the twentieth century, well-known examples include the Khmer Rouge and anti-communist regimes in Latin America, who tortured and murdered their victims as part of forced disappearance. Ba'athist Syria's massive torture program existed to eliminate dissent and for perpetrators to show loyalty to the regime, although all evidence indicates it did not reduce political opposition. Several torture researchers have argued that torture is used by Israel to dominate and terrorize Palestinians, particularly during the Gaza genocide. Another form of torture for deterrence is violence against migrants, as has been reported during pushbacks on the European Union's external borders.

=== Confession ===
Torture has been used throughout history to extract confessions from detainees. In 1764, Italian reformer Cesare Beccaria denounced torture as "a sure way to acquit robust scoundrels and to condemn weak but innocent people". Similar doubts about torture's effectiveness had been voiced for centuries previously, including by Aristotle. Despite the abolition of judicial torture, it sees continued use to elicit confessions, especially in judicial systems placing a high value on confessions in criminal matters. The use of torture to force suspects to confess is facilitated by laws allowing extensive pre-trial detention. Research has found that coercive interrogation is slightly more effective than cognitive interviewing for extracting a confession from a suspect, but presents a higher risk of false confession. Many torture victims will say whatever the torturer wants to hear to end the torture. Others who are guilty refuse to confess, especially if they believe it would only bring more torture or punishment. Medieval justice systems attempted to counteract the risk of false confession under torture by requiring confessors to provide falsifiable details about the crime, and only allowing torture if there was already some evidence against the accused. In some countries, political opponents are tortured to force them to confess publicly as a form of state propaganda.

=== Interrogation ===
The use of torture to obtain information during interrogation accounts for a small percentage of worldwide torture cases; its use for obtaining confessions or intimidation is more common. Although interrogational torture has been used in conventional wars, it is even more common in asymmetric war or civil wars. The ticking time bomb scenario is extremely rare, if not impossible, but is cited to justify torture for interrogation. Fictional portrayals of torture as an effective interrogational method have fueled misconceptions that justify the use of torture. Experiments comparing torture with other interrogation methods cannot be performed for ethical and practical reasons. Most scholars of torture are skeptical about its efficacy in obtaining accurate information, while others hold that it is impossible to know its effectiveness, and in some cases actionable intelligence has been obtained. Interrogational torture can often shade into confessional torture or simply into entertainment, and some torturers do not distinguish between interrogation and confession. Although skeptical of some criticisms of torture, Ron E. Hassner argues that to be effective torture must be planned and drawn out. "Our society would have to acquiesce to a massive bureaucratized torture campaign, at times of peace or war, that targeted thousands, from all walks of life, regardless of culpability, in order to extract modest intelligence that was, at best, corroborative."

== Methods ==
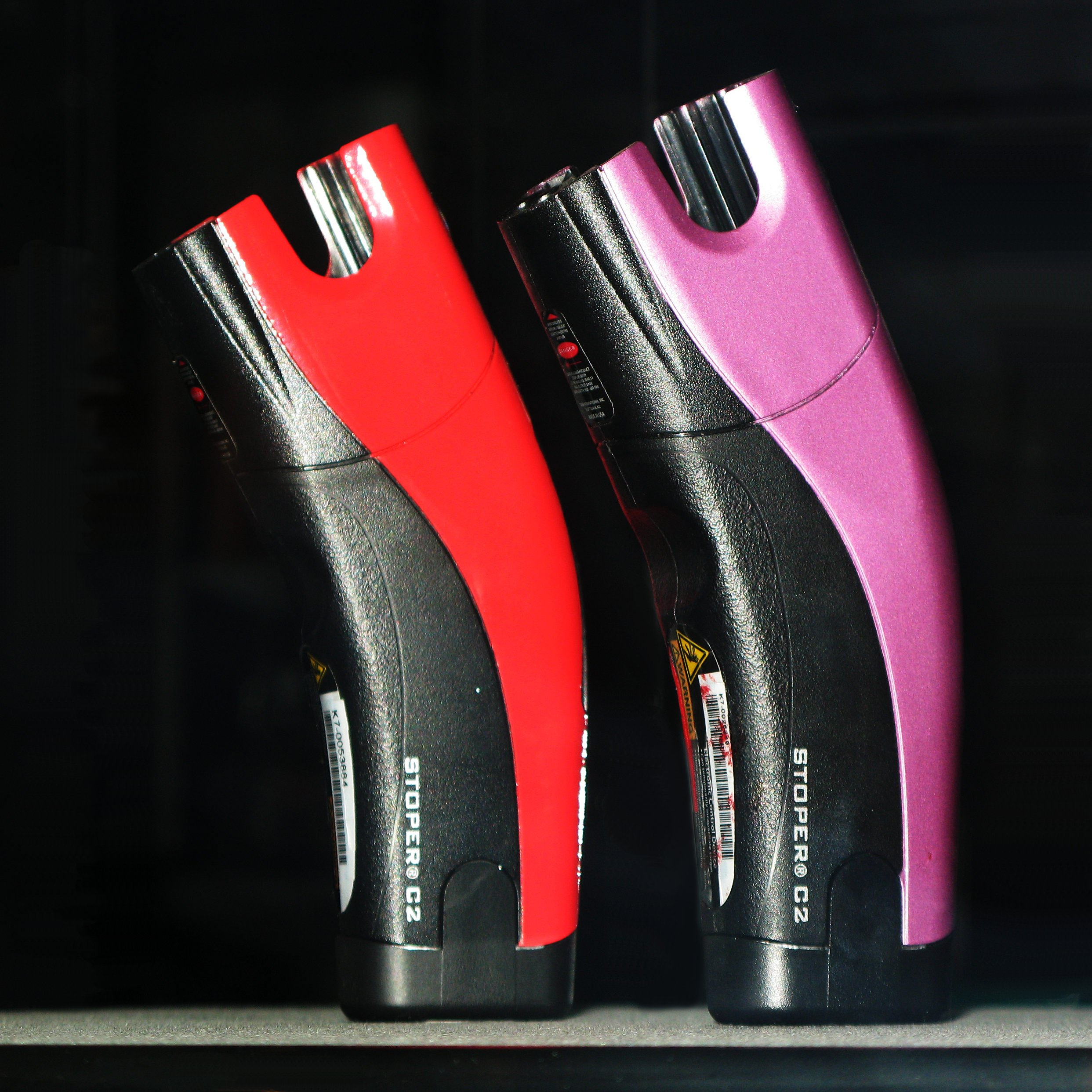
Electroshock weapons are preferred by some torturers because they have legitimate uses and do not leave marks.

A wide variety of techniques have been used for torture. Nevertheless, there are limited ways of inflicting pain while minimizing the risk of death. Survivors report that the exact method used is not significant. Most forms of torture include both physical and psychological elements and multiple methods are typically used on one person. Different methods of torture are popular in different countries. Low-tech methods are more commonly used than high-tech ones, and attempts to develop scientifically validated torture technology have failed. The prohibition of torture motivated a shift to methods that do not leave marks to aid in deniability and to deprive victims of legal redress. As they faced more pressure and scrutiny, democracies led the innovation in clean torture practices in the early twentieth century; such techniques diffused worldwide by the 1960s. Patterns of torture differ based on a torturer's time limits—for example, resulting from legal limits on pre-trial detention. While some methods are considered inherently tortuous, others may contribute to a finding of torture depending on the circumstances and cumulative impact.

Beatings or blunt trauma are the most common form of physical torture reported by about two-thirds of survivors. They may be either unsystematic or focused on a specific part of the body, as in falanga (the soles of the feet), repeated strikes against both ears, or shaking the detainee so that their head moves back and forth. Often, people are suspended in painful positions such as strappado or upside-down hanging in combination with beatings. People may also be subjected to stabbings or puncture wounds, have their nails removed, or body parts amputated. Burns are also common, especially cigarette burns, but other instruments are also employed, including hot metal, hot fluids, the sun, or acid. Forced ingestion of water, food, or other substances, or injections are also used as torture. Electric shocks are often used to torture, especially to avoid other methods that are more likely to leave scars. Asphyxiation, of which waterboarding is a form, inflicts torture on the victim by cutting off their air supply.

Psychological torture includes methods that involve no physical element as well as forcing a person to do something and physical attacks that ultimately target the mind. Death threats, mock execution, or being forced to witness the torture of another person are often reported to be subjectively worse than being physically tortured and are associated with severe sequelae. Other torture techniques include sleep deprivation, overcrowding or solitary confinement, withholding of food or water, sensory deprivation (such as hooding), exposure to extremes of light or noise (e.g., musical torture), humiliation (which can be based on sexuality or the victim's religious or national identity), and the use of animals such as dogs to frighten or injure a prisoner. Positional torture works by forcing the person to adopt a stance, putting their weight on a few muscles, causing pain without leaving marks, for example standing or squatting for extended periods. Rape and sexual assault are universal torture methods and frequently instill a permanent sense of shame in the victim and in some cultures, humiliate their family and society. Cultural and individual differences affect how the victim perceives different torture methods.

== Effects ==
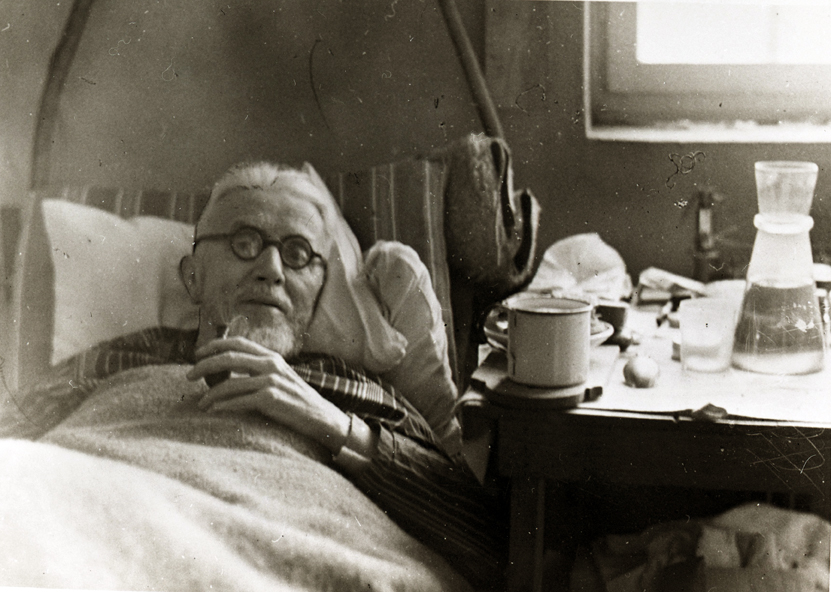
Norwegian resistance fighter Lauritz Sand recovering after his release from the Gestapo, May 1945

Torture is one of the most devastating experiences that a person can undergo. Torture aims to break the victim's will and destroy the victim's agency and personality. Torture survivor Jean Améry argued that it was "the most horrible event a human being can retain within himself" and that "whoever was tortured, stays tortured". Some torture victims, including Améry, later died by suicide. Survivors often experience social and financial problems. Circumstances such as housing insecurity, family separation, and the uncertainty of applying for asylum in a safe country strongly impact survivors' well-being.

Death is not an uncommon outcome of torture. Understanding of the link between specific torture methods and health consequences is lacking. These consequences can include peripheral neuropathy, damage to teeth, rhabdomyolysis from extensive muscle damage, traumatic brain injury, sexually transmitted infection, and pregnancy from rape. Chronic pain and pain-related disability are commonly reported, but there is scant research into this effect or possible treatments. Common psychological problems affecting survivors include traumatic stress, anxiety, depression, and sleep disturbance. An average of 40 percent have long-term post-traumatic stress disorder (PTSD), a higher rate than for any other traumatic experience. Not all survivors or rehabilitation experts support using medical categories to define their experience, and many survivors remain psychologically resilient.

Criminal prosecutions for torture are rare and most victims who submit formal complaints are not believed. Despite the efforts for evidence-based evaluation of the scars from torture such as the Istanbul Protocol, most physical examinations are inconclusive. The effects of torture are one of several factors that usually result in inconsistent testimony from survivors, hampering their effort to be believed and secure either refugee status in a foreign country or criminal prosecution of the perpetrators.

Although there is less research on the effects of torture on perpetrators, they can experience moral injury or trauma symptoms similar to the victims, especially when they feel guilty about their actions. Torture has corrupting effects on the institutions and societies that perpetrate it. Torturers forget important investigative skills because torture can be an easier way than time-consuming police work to achieve high conviction rates, encouraging the continued and increased use of torture. Public disapproval of torture can harm the international reputation of countries that use it, strengthen and radicalize violent opposition to those states, and encourage adversaries to themselves use torture.

== Public opinion ==
Studies have found that most people around the world oppose the use of torture in general. Some hold definite views on torture; for others, torture's acceptability depends on the victim. Support for torture in specific cases is correlated with the belief that torture is effective and used in ticking time bomb cases. Women are more likely to oppose torture than men. Nonreligious people are less likely to support the use of torture than religious people, although for the latter group, increased religiosity increases opposition to torture. The personality traits of right-wing authoritarianism, social dominance orientation, and retributivism are correlated with higher support for torture; embrace of democratic values such as liberty and equality reduces support for torture. Public opinion is most favorable to torture, on average, in countries with low per capita income and high levels of state repression. Public opinion and civil society mobilizations are an important constraint on the use of torture by states.

== Prohibition ==
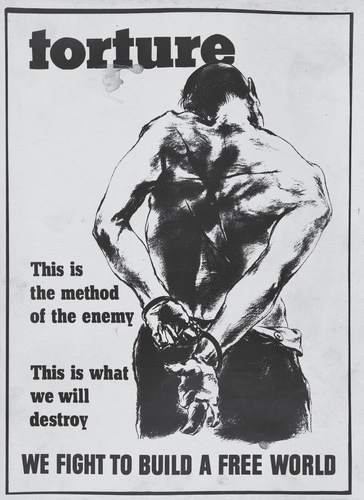
Proposed United States poster, 1942 or 1943

Parties to the Convention against Torture in dark green, states that have signed the treaty in yellow, and others in gray

The prohibition of torture is generally accepted as intended to protect human dignity and the physical and mental integrity of the victim. Torture is criticized based on all major ethical frameworks, including deontology, consequentialism, and virtue ethics. Some contemporary philosophers argue that torture is never morally acceptable; others propose exceptions to the general rule in real-life equivalents of the ticking time-bomb scenario. The accusation of torture is often perceived as a more serious stigma than inhuman or degrading treatment that causes similar amounts of human suffering.

The abolition and prohibition of torture was justified by rhetoric classifying it as barbaric and uncivilized. By the late nineteenth century, countries began to be condemned internationally for the use of torture. The ban on torture became part of the civilizing mission justifying colonial rule on the pretext of ending torture, despite the use of torture by colonial rulers themselves. The condemnation was strengthened during the twentieth century in reaction to the use of torture by Nazi Germany and the Soviet Union. Shocked by Nazi atrocities during World War II, after which torture featured prominently in the Nuremberg trials, the United Nations drew up the 1948 Universal Declaration of Human Rights, which prohibited torture. Torture stimulated the creation of the human rights movement. Beginning with the 1969 Greek case, the definition of torture—left undefined in most treaties—has been fleshed out in case law. In the early 1970s, Amnesty International launched a global campaign against torture, exposing its widespread use and leading to the United Nations Convention against Torture (CAT) in 1984.

The prohibition of torture is a peremptory norm (jus cogens) in international law, meaning that it is forbidden for all states under all circumstances. The CAT and its Optional Protocol focus on the prevention of torture, which was already prohibited in international human rights law (IHRL) under other treaties such as the International Covenant on Civil and Political Rights. The CAT specifies that torture must be a criminal offense under a country's laws, evidence obtained under torture may not be admitted in court, and deporting a person to another country where they are likely to face torture is forbidden. Even when it is illegal under national law, judges in many countries continue to admit evidence obtained under torture or ill treatment. It is disputed whether ratification of the CAT decreases, does not affect, or even increases the rate of torture in a country. Torture is prohibited in international criminal law as a war crime and crime against humanity; unlike in IHRL, it may be perpetrated by non-state actors. In 1987, Israel became the only country in the world to purportedly legalize torture. More prominently, the prohibition was challenged by the United States government using the same argument of state security deployed by Israel and various colonial powers, as it embarked on an overseas torture program as part of its war on terror.

== Prevention ==
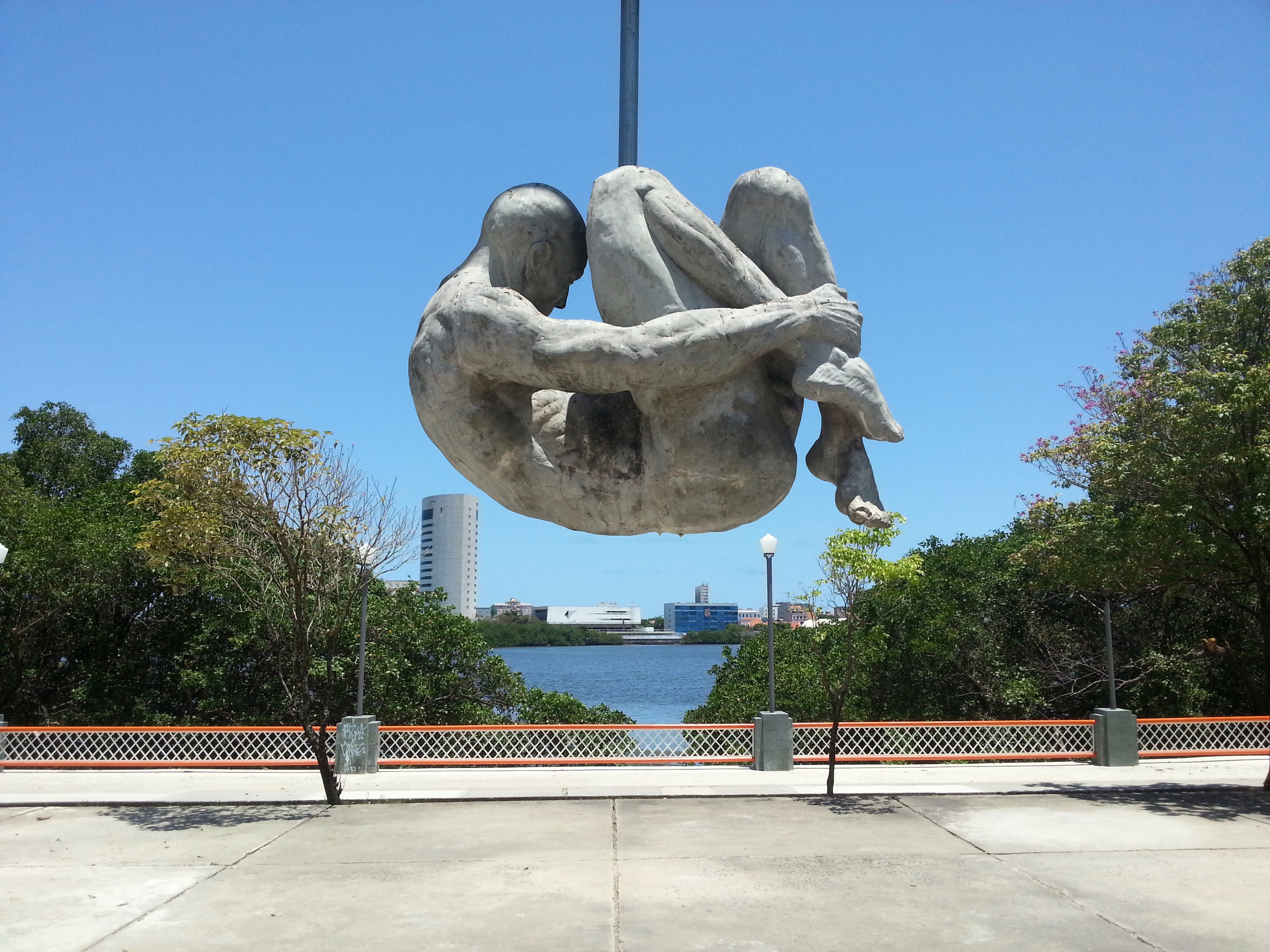
The Torture Never Again Monument in Brazil features a naked man hanging in the pau de arara position.

There is some evidence that institutionalized torture prevention reduces the rate of torture, although prevention efforts are complicated both by lack of understanding about why torture occurs and by lack of application of what is known. Torture proliferates in situations of incommunicado detention. Because the risk of torture is highest directly after an arrest, procedural safeguards such as immediate access to a lawyer and notifying relatives of an arrest are the most effective ways of prevention. Visits by independent monitoring bodies to detention sites can also help reduce torture. Legal changes that are not implemented in practice have little effect on the incidence of torture. Legal changes can be particularly ineffective in places where the law has limited legitimacy or is routinely ignored. Naming and shaming campaigns against torture have shown mixed results; they can be ineffective and even make things worse.

Sociologically torture operates as a subculture, frustrating prevention efforts because torturers can find a way around rules. Safeguards against torture in detention can be evaded by beating suspects during round-ups or on the way to the police station. General training of police to improve their ability to investigate crime has been more effective at reducing torture than specific training focused on human rights. Institutional police reforms have been effective when abuse is systematic. Political scientist Darius Rejali criticizes torture prevention research for not figuring out "what to do when people are bad; institutions broken, understaffed, and corrupt; and habitual serial violence is routine". Malcolm Evans, a longtime participant in United Nations anti-torture efforts, believes that "fundamental shifts and changes in societal attitudes" towards the people at risk of becoming torture victims may be required to put an end to torture.

== Sources ==
=== Books ===
- Baker, Jaber; Üngör, Ugur Ümit (2023). Syrian Gulag: Inside Assad's Prison System. Bloomsbury Publishing. ISBN 978-0-7556-5022-4.
- Barnes, Jamal (2017). A Genealogy of the Torture Taboo. Routledge. ISBN 978-1-351-97773-9.
- Carver, Richard; Handley, Lisa (2016). Does Torture Prevention Work?. Liverpool University Press. ISBN 978-1-78138-868-6.
- Celermajer, Danielle (2018). The Prevention of Torture: An Ecological Approach. Cambridge University Press. ISBN 978-1-108-63389-5.
- Collard, Melanie (2018). Torture as State Crime: A Criminological Analysis of the Transnational Institutional Torturer. Routledge. ISBN 978-1-315-45611-9.
- Evans, Malcolm D. (2023). Tackling Torture: Prevention in Practice. Policy Press. ISBN 978-1-5292-2568-6.
- Hajjar, Lisa (2013). Torture: A Sociology of Violence and Human Rights. Routledge. ISBN 978-0-415-51806-2.
- Hassner, Ron E. (2022). Anatomy of Torture. Cornell University Press. ISBN 978-1-5017-6205-5.
- Oette, Lutz (2024). The Transformation of the Prohibition of Torture in International Law. Oxford University Press. ISBN 978-0-19-888577-1.
- Pérez-Sales, Pau (2016). Psychological Torture: Definition, Evaluation and Measurement. Taylor & Francis. ISBN 978-1-317-20647-7.
- Rejali, Darius (2009). Torture and Democracy. Princeton University Press. ISBN 978-1-4008-3087-9.
- Wisnewski, J. Jeremy (2010). Understanding Torture. Edinburgh University Press. ISBN 978-0-7486-8672-8.
- Whitney, William Dwight; Smith, Benjamin Eli (1897). The Century Dictionary and Cyclopedia: Dictionary. The Century Company. OCLC 233135357.
- Young, Joseph K.; Kearns, Erin M. (2020). Tortured Logic: Why Some Americans Support the Use of Torture in Counterterrorism. Columbia University Press. ISBN 978-0-231-54809-0.

=== Book chapters ===
- Austin, Jonathan Luke (2022). "Why Perpetrators Matter". Contesting Torture: Interdisciplinary Perspectives. Taylor & Francis. pp. 19–37. ISBN 978-1-000-72592-6.
- Beam, Sara (2020). "Violence and Justice in Europe: Punishment, Torture and Execution". The Cambridge World History of Violence: Volume 3: AD 1500–AD 1800. Cambridge University Press. pp. 389–407. ISBN 978-1-107-11911-6.
- Evans, Rebecca (2020). "The Ethics of Torture: Definitions, History, and Institutions". Oxford Research Encyclopedia of International Studies. Oxford University Press. doi:10.1093/acrefore/9780190846626.013.326. ISBN 978-0-19-084662-6. Archived from the original on 30 October 2022.
- Frahm, Eckart (2006). "Images of Assyria in 19th and 20th Century Scholarship". Orientalism, Assyriology and the Bible. Sheffield Phoenix Press. pp. 74–94. ISBN 978-1-905048-37-3.
- Kelly, Tobias; Jensen, Steffen; Andersen, Morten Koch (2020). "Fragility, states and torture". Research Handbook on Torture: Legal and Medical Perspectives on Prohibition and Prevention. Edward Elgar Publishing. pp. 63–79. ISBN 978-1-78811-396-0.
- Nowak, Manfred (2014). "Torture and Other Cruel, Inhuman, or Degrading Treatment or Punishment". The Oxford Handbook of International Law in Armed Conflict. Oxford University Press. pp. 387–409. ISBN 978-0-19-163269-3.
- Pérez-Sales, Pau (2020). "Psychological torture". Research Handbook on Torture: Legal and Medical Perspectives on Prohibition and Prevention. Edward Elgar Publishing. pp. 432–454. ISBN 978-1-78811-396-0.
- Quiroga, José; Modvig, Jens (2020). "Torture methods and their health impact". Research Handbook on Torture: Legal and Medical Perspectives on Prohibition and Prevention. Edward Elgar Publishing. pp. 410–431. ISBN 978-1-78811-396-0.
- Rejali, Darius (2020). "The Field of Torture Today: Ten Years On from Torture and Democracy". Interrogation and Torture: Integrating Efficacy with Law and Morality. Oxford University Press. pp. 71–106. ISBN 978-0-19-009752-3.
- Saul, Ben; Flanagan, Mary (2020). "Torture and counter-terrorism". Research Handbook on International Law and Terrorism. Edward Elgar Publishing. pp. 354–370. ISBN 978-1-78897-222-2.
- Shue, Henry (2015). "Torture". The Routledge Handbook of Global Ethics. Routledge. pp. 113–126. ISBN 978-1-315-74452-0.
- Thomson, Mark; Bernath, Barbara (2020). "Preventing Torture: What Works?". Interrogation and Torture: Integrating Efficacy with Law and Morality. Oxford University Press. pp. 471–492. ISBN 978-0-19-009752-3.
- Wolfendale, Jessica (2019). "The Making of a Torturer". The Routledge International Handbook of Perpetrator Studies. Routledge. pp. 84–94. ISBN 978-1-315-10288-7.

=== Journal articles ===
- Bourgon, Jérôme (2003). "Abolishing 'Cruel Punishments': A Reappraisal of the Chinese Roots and Long-term Efficiency of the Xinzheng Legal Reforms". Modern Asian Studies. 37 (4): 851–862. doi:10.1017/S0026749X03004050. ISSN 0026-749X.
- Blakeley, Ruth (2007). "Why torture?". Review of International Studies. 33 (3): 373–394. doi:10.1017/S0260210507007565.
- Cakal, Ergün (2023). "Torture and progress, past and promised: problematising torture's evolving interpretation". International Journal of Law in Context. 19 (2): 236–254. doi:10.1017/S1744552323000010. ISSN 1744-5523.
- Einolf, Christopher J. (2007). "The Fall and Rise of Torture: A Comparative and Historical Analysis". Sociological Theory. 25 (2): 101–121. doi:10.1111/j.1467-9558.2007.00300.x.
- Einolf, Christopher J. (2022). "How Torture Fails: Evidence of Misinformation from Torture-Induced Confessions in Iraq". Journal of Global Security Studies. 7 (1) ogab019. doi:10.1093/jogss/ogab019.
- Einolf, Christopher J. (2023). "Understanding and Preventing Torture: a Review of the Literature". Human Rights Review. 24 (3): 319–338. doi:10.1007/s12142-023-00696-2. ISSN 1874-6306. S2CID 260663119.
- Guarch-Rubio, Marta; Byrne, Steven; Manzanero, Antonio L. (2020). "Violence and torture against migrants and refugees attempting to reach the European Union through Western Balkans". Torture. 30 (3): 67–83. doi:10.7146/torture.v30i3.120232. ISSN 1997-3322.
- Hamid, Aseel; Patel, Nimisha; Williams, Amanda C. de C. (2019). "Psychological, social, and welfare interventions for torture survivors: A systematic review and meta-analysis of randomised controlled trials". PLOS Medicine. 16 (9) e1002919. doi:10.1371/journal.pmed.1002919. PMC 6759153. PMID 31550249.
- Hassner, Ron E. (2020). "What Do We Know about Interrogational Torture?". International Journal of Intelligence and CounterIntelligence. 33 (1): 4–42. doi:10.1080/08850607.2019.1660951.
- Hatz, Sophia (2021). "What Shapes Public Support for Torture, and Among Whom?". Human Rights Quarterly. 43 (4): 683–698. doi:10.1353/hrq.2021.0055.
- Houck, Shannon C.; Repke, Meredith A. (2017). "When and why we torture: A review of psychology research". Translational Issues in Psychological Science. 3 (3): 272–283. doi:10.1037/tps0000120.
- Huggins, Martha K. (2012). "State Torture: Interviewing Perpetrators, Discovering Facilitators, Theorizing Cross-Nationally - Proposing "Torture 101"". State Crime Journal. 1 (1): 45–69. ISSN 2046-6056. JSTOR 41917770.
- Jensena, Steffen; Kelly, Tobias; Andersen, Morten Koch; Christiansen, Catrine; Sharma, Jeevan Raj (2017). "Torture and Ill-Treatment Under Perceived: Human Rights Documentation and the Poor". Human Rights Quarterly. 39 (2): 393–415. doi:10.1353/hrq.2017.0023. hdl:20.500.11820/f7a9a490-1825-42ab-802e-3b3825c72bb8. ISSN 1085-794X.
- Kelly, Tobias (2019). "The Struggle Against Torture: Challenges, Assumptions and New Directions". Journal of Human Rights Practice. 11 (2): 324–333. doi:10.1093/jhuman/huz019. hdl:20.500.11820/4cc28414-d254-4ab9-829f-b73a2fffd322.
- Meyer, Christian; Lohr, Christian; Gronenborn, Detlef; Alt, Kurt W. (2015). "The massacre mass grave of Schöneck-Kilianstädten reveals new insights into collective violence in Early Neolithic Central Europe". Proceedings of the National Academy of Sciences. 112 (36): 11217–11222. Bibcode:2015PNAS..11211217M. doi:10.1073/pnas.1504365112. PMC 4568710. PMID 26283359.
- Milewski, Andrew; Weinstein, Eliana; Lurie, Jacob; Lee, Annabel; Taki, Faten; Pilato, Tara; Jedlicka, Caroline; Kaur, Gunisha (2023). "Reported Methods, Distributions, and Frequencies of Torture Globally: A Systematic Review and Meta-Analysis". JAMA Network Open. 6 (10): e2336629. doi:10.1001/jamanetworkopen.2023.36629. PMC 10548313. PMID 37787994.
- Oette, Lutz (2021). "The Prohibition of Torture and Persons Living in Poverty: From the Margins to the Centre". International & Comparative Law Quarterly. 70 (2): 307–341. doi:10.1017/S0020589321000038. ISSN 0020-5893.
- Weishut, Daniel J. N.; Steiner-Birmanns, Bettina (2024). "A Review of Reasons for Inconsistency in Testimonies of Torture Victims". Psychological Injury and Law. 17 (1): 88–98. doi:10.1007/s12207-024-09498-4. ISSN 1938-971X.
- Williams, Amanda C. de C.; Hughes, John (2020). "Improving the assessment and treatment of pain in torture survivors". BJA Education. 20 (4): 133–138. doi:10.1016/j.bjae.2019.12.003. PMC 7807909. PMID 33456942.
