= Charles H. Morgan =

Charles H. Morgan may refer to

- Charles H. Morgan (politician) (1842–1912), American politician
- Charles Hale Morgan (1834–1875), American soldier of the Utah Expedition and the Civil War
- Charles Morgan (coach) (fl. 1938–1948), American football and basketball coach

== See also ==
- Charles Morgan (disambiguation)
