= Torture in fiction =

Fictional representations of torture

In fictional representations, torture is often portrayed as a method for obtaining information through interrogation. Unlike the real world practice of torture, fictional representations of torture are often portrayed as being professional and efficient methods of obtaining reliable information, and as selective rather than indiscriminate. Torture can be a convenient plot device to extract information, and when the hero is the torturer, it almost always works, usually quickly. Popular culture representations have an effect on how torture is practiced in the real world; United States Army interrogators as well as the staff at Guantanamo Bay have copied torture techniques that they learned from TV. Positive depictions of torture during the Algerian War of Independence helped shape the public perception of torture, a trend that continued with American media produced after the September 11 attacks.

== Background ==
Torture, defined as agents of the government inflicting severe pain or suffering on someone, is illegal under international law under all circumstances.

== Fictional depictions by conflict ==
=== Algerian war of independence ===
Fictional depictions of torture during the Algerian War of Independence, especially The Battle of Algiers, Lost Command, and The Centurions, were especially influential in shaping popular perceptions of torture, as they were much better known than actual events. The Centurions introduced the ticking time bomb scenario in which under torture, a National Liberation Front (FLN) operative quickly exposed the location of fifteen bombs. Political scientist Darius Rejali argues that "The point of [The Centurions] is that failing to torture is the sissy's response; only a real man knows what to do." The Battle of Algiers misrepresents the history of the battle in order to imply that selective French use of torture against insurgents caused its victory (in fact, the torture was much more indiscriminate than portrayed). During the war in Afghanistan, United States servicemen were inspired by these fictional portrayals for interrogation of enemies.

In the twenty-first century, French films shifted to portraying torture as negative, including La Trahison (2005) and Mon colonel (2006). The 2007 French film Intimate Enemies explored perpetrator trauma resulting from the Algerian War.

=== Cold War ===
Torture in preparation for show trials in the Eastern Bloc was depicted in the 1970 French film The Confession, based on the memoirs of Slansky trial defendant Artur London. Scriptwriter Jorge Semprún said that the intent of the film was not to overdo torture scenes that would alienate the viewer, but rather show "the slow erasure of a man through isolation, hunger, cold, exhaustion".

=== War on terror ===
After the September 11 attacks, the United States started a state-sanctioned torture program as part of the war on terror. The George W. Bush administration rejected the label "torture" for its practices, calling them "enhanced interrogation techniques". Effectiveness of the United States torture program was limited, with many detainees refusing to talk or providing false information.

The amount of torture depicted on American television increased dramatically. The United States TV series 24 (2001–2010) was inspired by the earlier depictions of the Algerian War, and other 2000s TV shows such as Star Trek: Enterprise, The Shield, and LOST also portray the heroes as torturers. The hero of 24, Jack Bauer, is regularly depicted torturing antagonists using a variety of torture methods; hardened terrorists are depicted as giving in quickly and revealing important information. David Danzig, the director of Human Rights First's campaign against torture, calls the TV series "an advertisement for torture" that targets both villains and torture opponents. The only person who is not successfully tortured is Bauer, who temporarily dies from torture in the second season.

In order to combat the unrealistic portrayal of torture in American television and movies, in 2006 Human Rights First went to Hollywood with Stuart Herrington, a former intelligence officer during the Vietnam War, Patrick Finnegan, the dean of West Point, and FBI interrogation expert Joe Navarro. They met with LOST producer Jeff Pinkner, who told them that he had never considered that "what we came up with in our fevered minds might have any impact on the way these things were done in the real world". Kiefer Sutherland, the actor who played Bauer, explained that the TV show is just supposed to be entertainment, rather than influencing political debate. One reason why torture scenes are preferred according to industry experts is that they can be done quickly, fitting in to a short runtime.

Adam Fierro, the producer of 24, realized that realistic depiction of torture was an unfilled market niche, which he decided to fill with his TV series The Shield, which features an innocent man who is tortured to death. Human Rights First created an educational film Primetime Torture, that it distributed to military educators in order to help them explain that TV depictions of torture are not realistic. According to Rejali, the documentary Taxi to the Dark Side inaccurately portrays a CIA science of torture that did not exist and exonerates low-level soldiers for the killing of Dilawar "in nonemergency conditions and using ordinary military techniques". The CIA was involved in the filming of the 2012 film Zero Dark Thirty, which has been criticized for its portrayal of torture.

=== Israeli–Palestinian conflict ===
Israeli films set during the intifadas have also featured torture.

== Science fiction ==
Star Trek television shows have depicted torture in numerous episodes. The protagonists are only depicted as torturers in four out of 21 cases of torture; torture is depicted as effective in 11 out of the 21 cases. The most in-depth depiction of torture is in the episode "Chain of Command" from Star Trek: The Next Generation in which Captain Jean-Luc Picard is captured by the Cardassians and tortured by Gul Madred, who repeatedly shows Picard four lights and tries to get him to say there are five. Although in Star Trek the torture victims usually recover at once, Picard requires rehabilitation after being rescued.

== Effects ==
A 2018 study found that viewing media that depicted torture as effective increased support for it, while a 2021 study did not find evidence that watching cinematic depictions of torture affected public opinion on torture. In 2003, the Pentagon screened The Battle of Algiers as an example of what tactics they might face during the United States invasion of Iraq. Celebrities such as Supreme Court justice Antonin Scalia, Bush administration officials John Yoo and Michael Chertoff, former president Bill Clinton, and Republican presidential candidate Tom Tancredo all cited 24 during debates on torture, often to excuse or normalize it. Popular culture representations have an effect on how torture is practiced in the real world; United States Army interrogators as well as the staff at Guantanamo Bay have copied torture techniques that they learned from film. United States military instructors report that their trainees often cite 24 as a reason why torture is sometimes justified.

== See also ==
- Popular culture in torture
- Torture museum

== Cited works and other sources ==
- Adams, Alex (2021). "The Report and the Task of Critique: Torture, Exposure, and the Spectacle of Accountability". Quarterly Review of Film and Video. 39 (7): 1619–1633. doi:10.1080/10509208.2021.1963164. S2CID 238707055.
- Adams, Alex (2016). Political Torture in Popular Culture: The Role of Representations in the Post-9/11 Torture Debate. Routledge. ISBN 978-1-317-28938-8.
- Andén-Papadopoulos, Kari (2008). "The Abu Ghraib torture photographs: News frames, visual culture, and the power of images". Journalism. 9 (1): 5–30. doi:10.1177/1464884907084337. S2CID 144645556.
- Carrabine, Eamonn (2011). "Images of torture: Culture, politics and power". Crime, Media, Culture. 7 (1): 5–30. doi:10.1177/1741659011404418. S2CID 144745779.
- Danzig, David (2012). "Countering the Jack Bauer Effect: An Examination of How to Limit the Influence of Tv'S Most Popular, and Most Brutal, Hero". In Flynn, Michael; Salek, Fabiola F. (eds.). Screening Torture: Media Representations of State Terror and Political Domination. Columbia University Press. doi:10.7312/columbia/9780231153591.003.0002. ISBN 978-0-231-52697-5. JSTOR 10.7312/flyn15358.4.
- Hayward, Susan (2016). "The Ideological Purpose of Torture: Artur London's Nightmare of Reality in L'Aveu/The Confession (Costa-Gavras, 1970)". Screening the Tortured Body: The Cinema as Scaffold. Palgrave Macmillan UK. pp. 111–132. ISBN 978-1-137-39918-2.
- Hron, Madelaine (2008). "Torture Goes Pop!". Peace Review. 20 (1): 22–30. doi:10.1080/10402650701873684. S2CID 145721041.
- Gilmore, James N. (2017). "Zero Dark Thirty and the Writing of Post-9/11 History". Quarterly Review of Film and Video. 34 (3): 275–294. doi:10.1080/10509208.2016.1194110. S2CID 192669287.
- Jung, Berenike (2020). The Invisibilities of Political Torture: Visual Evidence in US and Chilean Cinema and Television. Edinburgh University Press. ISBN 978-1-4744-3699-1.
- Kearns, Erin M.; Young, Joseph K. (2018). "'If Torture Is Wrong, What About 24?' Torture and the Hollywood Effect". Crime & Delinquency. 64 (12): 1568–1589. doi:10.1177/0011128717738230. S2CID 219960229.
- Kearns, Erin M.; Delehanty, Casey (2021). "The Fast & the Furious...Torturous?: Examining the Impact of Torture Scenes in Popular Films on Public Perceptions of Torture Policy". Studies in Conflict & Terrorism: 1–16. doi:10.1080/1057610X.2021.1983211. S2CID 244227590.
- Lokaneeta, Jinee (2011). Transnational Torture: Law, Violence, and State Power in the United States and India. New York University Press. ISBN 978-0-8147-6511-1.
- Morag, Raya (2013). Waltzing with Bashir: Perpetrator Trauma and Cinema. Bloomsbury Publishing. ISBN 978-0-85773-436-5.
- Neroni, Hilary (2020). "The political efficacy of torture in The Confession (1970)". The Films of Costa-Gavras. Manchester University Press. ISBN 978-1-5261-4693-9.
- Rejali, Darius (2009). Torture and Democracy. Princeton University Press. ISBN 978-1-4008-3087-9.
- Rejali, Darius (2012). "Movies of Modern Torture as Convenient Truths". Screening Torture: Media Representations of State Terror and Political Domination. Columbia University Press. ISBN 978-0-231-52697-5.
- Rejali, Darius (2020). "The Field of Torture Today: Ten Years on from Torture and Democracy". Interrogation and Torture: Integrating Efficacy with Law and Morality. Oxford University Press. ISBN 978-0-19-009752-3.
- Richardson, Michael (2016). Gestures of Testimony: Torture, Trauma, and Affect in Literature. Bloomsbury Publishing USA. ISBN 978-1-5013-1582-4.
- Richards, Cynthia (2013). "Interrogating Oroonoko: Torture in a New World and a New Fiction of Power". Eighteenth-Century Fiction. 25 (4): 647–676. doi:10.3138/ecf.25.4.647. S2CID 153786231.
- Schlag, Gabi (2021). "Representing torture in Zero Dark Thirty (2012): Popular culture as a site of norm contestation". Media, War & Conflict. 14 (2): 174–190. doi:10.1177/1750635219864023. JSTOR 27285323. S2CID 201386160.
- Sturken, Marita (2011). "Comfort, irony, and trivialization: The mediation of torture". International Journal of Cultural Studies. 14 (4): 423–440. doi:10.1177/1367877911403250. S2CID 143321606.
- Tracy, Larissa (2012). Torture and Brutality in Medieval Literature: Negotiations of National Identity. DS Brewer. ISBN 978-1-84384-288-0.
- Vuori, Juha A. (2017). "To boldly torture where no one has tortured before – Star Trek and the transformation of the 'progressive' social imaginary of torture in the United States". Global Discourse. 7 (2): 309–326. doi:10.1080/23269995.2017.1332315.
- Wallenbrock, Nicole Beth (2016). "An Apology for French Torturers: L'Ennemi intime (2007)". Screening the Tortured Body: The Cinema as Scaffold. Palgrave Macmillan UK. pp. 89–108. ISBN 978-1-137-39918-2.
