= Frontiers and Ghettos =

2003 sociology book

Frontiers and Ghettos: State Violence in Serbia and Israel
- Author: James Ron
- Language: English
- Subject: State violence
- Genre: Non-fiction
- Publisher: University of California Press
- Publication date: 2003
- Publication place: United States

Frontiers and Ghettos: State Violence in Serbia and Israel is a sociological book written by James Ron, Harold E. Stassen Chair in International Affairs at the University of Minnesota. Inspired by his time as a member of the Israel Defense Forces, as a research consultant for Human Rights Watch, and as a research consultant for the International Red Cross, Ron asks: "what explains why states use different kinds of violence in some cases and not others?" For Ron, institutional distinctions and international norms are key to explaining diverse repertoires of state violence against similar victims.

== Summary ==
In Frontiers and Ghettos, James Ron argues that states use different methods and degrees of coercion against perceived national enemies as a result of variation in institutional contexts. When a targeted group is ghettoized, they are likely to become victims of severe, police-style repression but not ethnic cleansing or murder. Contrarily, when a targeted group exists on a frontier, they are more likely to become victims of cleansing and death instead of repression. This is because in ghettos, states have unrivaled control but are also bound by international and domestic legal and moral obligations to its inhabitants. Along frontiers, states have less control as well as fewer and weaker moral obligations. According to Ron, the more that a state controls a given territory, the more it feels a “bureaucratic, moral, and political sense of responsibility” for the fate of those within it. This sense of responsibility leads states to choose less overtly violent modes of repression in ghettos as compared to when states target populations exist on the periphery.

== Case studies ==
James Ron examines five cases of ethnic violence and ethnic policing in two States, Serbia and Israel, over similar periods of time. The cases are as follows:

1. Serbian ethnic cleansing on the Bosnian frontier from 1992-1993.
2. Serbian ethnic policing against non-serbs in the Sandzak and Vojvodina from 1992-1993.
3. Serbian switch from ethnic policing in Kosovo from 1990-1997 to ethnic cleansing in 1998-1999.
4. Israeli repression of Palestinians during The First Intifada in the West Bank and Gaza in 1988.
5. Israeli destruction of PLO forces and Palestinian refugees during the 1982 Lebanon War.

Ron uses field interviews, newspaper reports and academic publications to illustrate the importance of institutional context for explaining repertoires of state violence. He argues that Serbia engaged in ethnic cleansing in Bosnia because in 1992, Bosnia became a frontier. On the other hand, Israel policed Palestinians in 1988 because Palestine at the time was a ghetto, even though the threat posed by Palestinians during the 1988 uprising was greater. The more states controlled territories and peoples, the less likely their security forces were to ethnically cleanse perceived national enemies.

== Reception ==
Frontiers and Ghettos was favorably received by many sociologists and political scientists as well as human rights organizations working on issues related to state violence. For example, the historian L. Carl Brown, writing for Foreign Affairs magazine, wrote that the book offered "a well-documented study of Ron's chosen examples and a sophisticated framework for understanding other such situations." Sociologist Anthony Obserschall compliments Ron for his "engaging and promising" hypothesis as well as his "fascinating" use of detail that make the footnotes as pleasurable to read as the main text." However, Obserschall also critiques Ron on several grounds. For example, he argues that (1) the ethnic policing versus cleansing distinction is too crude for legal and normative evaluations of state violence, and (2) the frontier concept is applied inconsistently for the comparisons Ron wishes to make. In the former critique, Obserschall notes how 750 Palestinians were killed during The First Intifada, 13,000 were wounded, hundreds lost their homes, and thousands were arrested and detained. In the latter critique, Obserschall writes that the Lebanese frontier and Bosnian frontier are not as comparable as Ron makes them out to be. Bosniaks in Bosnia were unarmed and defenseless whereas Palestinian paramilitaries in South Lebanon were heavily armed and frequently engaged in cross-border military actions against Israelis. Political Scientist Darius Rejali writes that Ron argues "persuasively" why it is important to study not just why violence is done, but how. He adds, "[Ron's] "study of the practice shows that international norms are far more robust than political scientists normally imagine".
