= Marcus McDilda =

American P-51 fighter pilot

- Born: Marcus Elmo McDilda; December 15, 1921; Dunnellon, Florida, U.S.
- Died: August 16, 1998 (aged 76); Dunnellon, Florida, U.S.
- Resting place: Rockwell Cemetery: Dunnellon, Florida
- Known for: USAAF fighter pilot shot down and captured by the Japanese
- Military career
- Allegiance: United States
- Branch: United States Army Air Forces
- Rank: First lieutenant
- Conflicts: World War II: Japan campaign
- Awards: Prisoner of War Medal

First lieutenant Marcus Elmo McDilda (December 15, 1921 – August 16, 1998) was an American fighter pilot who was shot down over Japan during World War II. Under interrogation, he gave false information to the Japanese regarding the atomic bomb.

== Biography ==
McDilda, who was from Dunnellon, Florida, was a P-51 fighter pilot. On August 8, 1945, two days after the atomic bombing of Hiroshima, his plane was shot down during a strafing mission over Osaka and he was taken prisoner.

After his capture, McDilda was paraded through the streets of Osaka, where he was blindfolded and beaten by civilians. He was then interrogated by the Kempeitai, the Japanese military police, who tortured McDilda in order to discover how many atomic bombs the Allies had and what the future targets were. McDilda, who knew nothing about the atomic bomb nor the Manhattan Project, initially admitted that he knew nothing about the atomic bombs, but, after a Japanese officer threatened to kill him, McDilda "confessed" that the U.S. had 100 atomic bombs that would be dropped on Tokyo and Kyoto, the only Japanese cities he knew the names of, within "the next few days". McDilda's "testimony" included the following nonsensical description of an atomic bomb:

As you know, when atoms are split, there are a lot of pluses and minuses released. Well, we've taken these and put them in a huge container and separated them from each other with a lead shield. When the box is dropped out of a plane, we melt the lead shield and the pluses and minuses come together. When that happens, it causes a tremendous bolt of lightning and all the atmosphere over a city is pushed back! Then when the atmosphere rolls back, it brings about a tremendous thunderclap, which knocks down everything beneath it.

This "confession" led the Japanese to consider McDilda a "Very Important Person" and he was flown to Tokyo the next morning, where he was interrogated by a civilian scientist, who was a graduate of the City College of New York. The interrogator quickly realized McDilda knew nothing of nuclear fission and was giving fake testimony. McDilda explained that he had told his Osaka questioners that he knew nothing, but when that was not accepted, he had to "tell the lie to stay alive". McDilda was taken to a cell and fed, and awaited his fate; but he was rescued from the prisoner-of-war camp in Ōmori nineteen days later, after it was captured by the 4th Marine Regiment. The move to Tokyo had probably saved McDilda's life; after the announcement of the Japanese surrender, fifty U.S. soldiers imprisoned in Osaka were executed by Japanese soldiers.

This case has been cited as evidence that interrogational torture is ineffective, as his "confession" might have been counterproductive to Japan's intelligence-gathering.
