= Definitions of torture =

Torture is generally understood as deliberately inflicting "severe pain or suffering", usually on a person under some kind of custody. However, the definition of torture is subject to debate, and its practical implications are disputed.

== International level ==
=== UN Convention Against Torture ===
The United Nations Convention against Torture and Other Cruel, Inhuman or Degrading Treatment or Punishment, which is currently in force since 26 June 1987, defines "torture" in Article 1.1 as:

any act by which severe pain or suffering, whether physical or mental, is intentionally inflicted on a person for such purposes as obtaining from him, or a third person, information or a confession, punishing him for an act he or a third person has committed or is suspected of having committed, or intimidating or coercing him or a third person, or for any reason based on discrimination of any kind when such pain or suffering is inflicted by or at the instigation of or with the consent or acquiescence of a public official or other person acting in an official capacity. It does not include pain or suffering arising only from, inherent in, or incidental to, lawful sanctions.

Legal scholars argue that the phrase "persons acting in an official capacity" is deliberately broad to include all instances of coercive power by private actors effectively exercising public authority. In fact, the jurisprudence of the Committee Against Torture extends accountability beyond state agencies or outsourced government-contracts: any government-sanctioned (either de facto or de jure) authoritative activities, such as those undertaken in educational, prisional, rehabilitation, correctional, child care, medical, security, etc. services are equally bound by international law.

However, some professionals in the torture rehabilitation field believe that this definition is still too restrictive, as it appears to exclude:

1. torture perpetrated by gangs, hate groups, rebels, or terrorists who ignore national or international mandates;
2. arbitrary violence during war; and
3. practices allowed by national laws, even if it involves corporal punishments ranging from whipping to mutilation, when deemed lawful;

and that the scope should be broadened to all politically motivated acts of organized violence.

=== Declaration of Tokyo ===
An even broader definition was used in the 1975 Declaration of Tokyo regarding the participation of medical professionals in acts of torture:

For the purpose of this Declaration, torture is defined as the deliberate, systematic or wanton infliction of physical or mental suffering by one or more persons acting alone or on the orders of any authority, to force another person to yield information, to make a confession, or for any other reason.

This definition includes torture as part of domestic violence or ritualistic abuse, as well as in criminal activities.

=== Rome Statute of the International Criminal Court ===
The Rome Statute is the treaty that set up the International Criminal Court (ICC). The treaty was adopted at a diplomatic conference in Rome on 17 July 1998 and went into effect on 1 July 2002. The Rome Statute provides the simplest definition of torture regarding the prosecution of war criminals by the International Criminal Court. Paragraph 1 under Article 7(e) of the Rome Statute provides that:

"Torture" means the intentional infliction of severe pain or suffering, whether physical or mental, upon a person in the custody or under the control of the accused; except that torture shall not include pain or suffering arising only from, inherent in or incidental to, lawful sanctions;

=== Inter-American Convention to Prevent and Punish Torture ===
The Inter-American Convention to Prevent and Punish Torture, which is in force since 28 February 1987, defines torture more expansively than the United Nations Convention Against Torture. Article 2 of the Inter-American Convention reads:

For the purposes of this Convention, torture shall be understood to be any act intentionally performed whereby physical or mental pain or suffering is inflicted on a person for purposes of a criminal investigation, as a means of intimidation, as personal punishment, as a preventive measure, as a penalty, or for any other purpose. Torture shall also be understood to be the use of methods upon a person intended to obliterate the personality of the victim or to diminish his physical or mental capacities, even if they do not cause physical pain or mental anguish. The concept of torture shall not include physical or mental pain or suffering that is inherent in or solely the consequence of lawful measures, provided that they do not include the performance of the acts or use of the methods referred to in this article.

=== Amnesty International ===
Since 1973, Amnesty International has adopted the simplest, broadest definition of torture. It reads:

Torture is the systematic and deliberate infliction of acute pain by one person on another, or on a third person, in order to accomplish the purpose of the former against the will of the latter.

=== European Court of Human Rights ===
The UN Convention Against Torture and Rome Statute and the definitions of torture include terms such as "severe pain or suffering". The international European Court of Human Rights (ECHR) has ruled on the difference between what is inhuman and degrading treatment and what is pain and suffering severe enough to be torture.

In Ireland v. United Kingdom (1979–1980) the ECHR ruled that the five techniques developed by the United Kingdom (wall-standing, hooding, subjection to noise, deprivation of sleep, and deprivation of food and drink), as used against fourteen detainees in Northern Ireland by the United Kingdom were "inhuman and degrading" and breached the European Convention on Human Rights, but did not amount to "torture". In 2014, after new information was uncovered that showed the decision to use the five techniques in Northern Ireland in 1971–1972 had been taken by British ministers. The Irish Government asked the ECHR to review its judgement. In 2018, by six votes to one, the Court declined.

In Aksoy v. Turkey (1997) the Court found Turkey guilty of torture in 1996 in the case of a detainee who was suspended by his arms while his hands were tied behind his back.

The Court's ruling that the five techniques did not amount to torture was later cited by the United States and Israel to justify their own interrogation methods, which included the five techniques.

The Court has ruled that every form of torture is strictly prohibited in all circumstances:

Article 3 of the Convention enshrines one of the most fundamental values of democratic societies. Even in the most difficult of circumstances, such as the fight against terrorism or crime, the Convention prohibits in absolute terms torture or inhuman or degrading treatment or punishment.

Article 3 makes no provision for exceptions and no derogation from it is permissible under Article 15 § 2 even in the event of a public emergency threatening the life of the nation (...).

== Municipal level ==
=== United States ===
==== U.S. Code § 2340 ====
Title 18 of the United States Code contains the definition of torture in 18 U.S.C. § 2340, which is only applicable to persons committing or attempting to commit torture outside of the United States. It reads:

As used in this chapter—

(1) "torture" means an act committed by a person acting under the color of law specifically intended to inflict severe physical or mental pain or suffering (other than pain or suffering incidental to lawful sanctions) upon another person within his custody or physical control;
(2) "severe mental pain or suffering" means the prolonged mental harm caused by or resulting from—

(A) the intentional infliction or threatened infliction of severe physical pain or suffering;
(B) the administration or application, or threatened administration or application, of mind-altering substances or other procedures calculated to disrupt profoundly the senses or the personality;
(C) the threat of imminent death; or
(D) the threat that another person will imminently be subjected to death, severe physical pain or suffering, or the administration or application of mind-altering substances or other procedures calculated to disrupt profoundly the senses or personality; and

(3) "United States" means the several states of the United States, the District of Columbia, and the commonwealths, territories, and possessions of the United States.

In order for the United States to assume control over this jurisdiction, the alleged offender must be a U.S. national or the alleged offender must be present in the United States, irrespective of the nationality of the victim or alleged offender. Any person who conspires to commit an offense shall be subject to the same penalties (other than the penalty of death) as the penalties prescribed for an actual act or attempting to commit an act, the commission of which was the object of the conspiracy.

==== Torture Victim Protection Act of 1991 ====
The Torture Victim Protection Act of 1991 provides remedies to individuals who are victims of torture by persons acting in an official capacity of any foreign nation. The definition is similar to the U.S. Code § 2340, which reads:

(b) TORTURE.—For the purposes of this Act—

(1) the term "torture" means any act, directed against an individual in the offender's custody or physical control, by which severe pain or suffering (other than pain or suffering arising only from or inherent in, or incidental to, lawful sanctions), whether physical or mental, is intentionally inflicted on that individual for such purposes as obtaining from that individual or third person information or a confession, punishing that individual for an act that individual or a third person has committed or is suspected of having committed, intimidating or coercing that individual or a third person, or for any reason based on discrimination of any kind; and
2) mental pain or suffering refers to prolonged mental harm caused by or resulting from—

(A) the intentional infliction or threatened infliction of severe physical pain or suffering;
(B) the administration or application, or threatened administration or application, of mind-altering substances or other procedures calculated to disrupt profoundly the senses or the personality;
(C) the threat of imminent death; or
(D) the threat that another individual will imminently be subjected to death, severe physical pain or suffering, or the administration or application of mind-altering substances or other procedures calculated to disrupt profoundly the senses or personality.
