= Charlie Morgan =

Charlie Morgan may refer to:

- Charlie Morgan (musician) (born 1955), English musician, singer and songwriter
- Charlie Morgan (cricketer) (born 1989), English cricketer
- Charlie Morgan (soccer) (born 1962), American soccer defender
- Charlie Morgan (wrestler) (born 1992), English professional wrestler
- Charley Morgan (born 1929), sailboat racer and designer
- Charlie Morgan, stage name of Charlie Feathers, English musician

== See also ==
- Charles Morgan (disambiguation)
