= Christopher J. Einolf =

American sociologist

Christopher J. Einolf is a sociologist whose research interests include altruism, charitable giving, and volunteering, as well as torture and human rights. He is a professor of sociology at Northern Illinois University.

== Works ==
- Einolf, Christopher J. (2001). The Mercy Factory: Refugees and the American Asylum System. I.R. Dee. ISBN 978-1-56663-400-7.
- Einolf, Christopher J. (2007). "The Fall and Rise of Torture: A Comparative and Historical Analysis". Sociological Theory. 25 (2): 101–121. doi:10.1111/j.1467-9558.2007.00300.x. S2CID 53345959.
- Einolf, Christopher J. (2008). "Empathic concern and prosocial behaviors: A test of experimental results using survey data". Social Science Research. 37 (4): 1267–1279. doi:10.1016/j.ssresearch.2007.06.003. PMID 19227702. S2CID 205236870.
- Einolf, Christopher J. (2009). "Will the Boomers Volunteer During Retirement? Comparing the Baby Boom, Silent, and Long Civic Cohorts". Nonprofit and Voluntary Sector Quarterly. 38 (2): 181–199. doi:10.1177/0899764008315182. S2CID 20517626.
- Minow, Jacqueline Chevalier; Einolf, Christopher J. (2009). "Sorority Participation and Sexual Assault Risk". Violence Against Women. 15 (7): 835–851. doi:10.1177/1077801209334472. PMID 19458092. S2CID 21877160.
- Einolf, Christopher J. (2011). "Gender Differences in the Correlates of Volunteering and Charitable Giving". Nonprofit and Voluntary Sector Quarterly. 40 (6): 1092–1112. doi:10.1177/0899764010385949. S2CID 7191436.
- Einolf, C. J. (2011). "The Link Between Religion and Helping Others: The Role of Values, Ideas, and Language". Sociology of Religion. 72 (4): 435–455. doi:10.1093/socrel/srr017.
- Einolf, Christopher; Chambré, Susan M. (2011). "Who volunteers? Constructing a hybrid theory: Who volunteers? Constructing a hybrid theory". International Journal of Nonprofit and Voluntary Sector Marketing. 16 (4): 298–310. doi:10.1002/nvsm.429.
- Einolf, Christopher J. (2012). George Thomas: Virginian for the Union. University of Oklahoma Press. ISBN 978-0-8061-8260-5.
- Einolf, Christopher J. (2016). America in the Philippines, 1899-1902: The First Torture Scandal. Palgrave Macmillan US. ISBN 978-1-137-46076-9.
