= Charles Morgan (Victoria cricketer) =

Australian cricketer

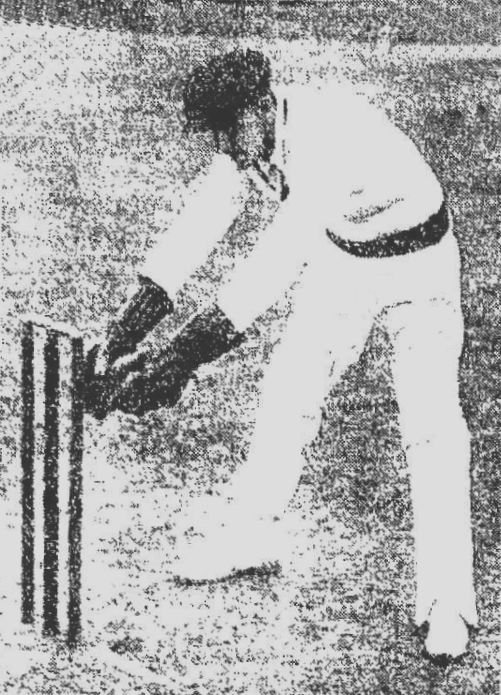

Personal information
- Born: 10 August 1900; Melbourne, Australia
- Died: 8 December 1965 (aged 65); Melbourne, Australia

Domestic team information
- Years: Team
- 1927: Victoria
- Source: Cricinfo, 21 November 2015

Charles Morgan (10 August 1900 – 8 December 1965) was an Australian cricketer. He played one first-class cricket match for Victoria in 1927.

== See also ==
- List of Victoria first-class cricketers
