= Shane O'Mara (neuroscientist) =

Irish researcher and professor

- Scientific career
- Fields: Neuroscience
- Institutions: Trinity College Dublin

Shane O'Mara is an Irish neuroscientist who serves as the professor of experimental brain research at Trinity College Dublin. He is a member of the Royal Irish Academy.

== Works ==
- O'Mara, Shane (2015). Why Torture Doesn't Work: The Neuroscience of Interrogation. Harvard University Press. ISBN 978-0-674-74390-8.
- O'Mara, Shane (2017). A Brain for Business – A Brain for Life: How insights from behavioural and brain science can change business and business practice for the better. Springer. ISBN 978-3-319-49154-7.
- O'Mara, Shane (2019). In Praise of Walking: The new science of how we walk and why it's good for us. Random House. ISBN 978-1-4735-4991-3.
- O'Mara, Shane (2023). Talking Heads: The New Science of How Conversation Shapes Our Worlds. Penguin. ISBN 978-1-8479-2648-7
