= Charles Morgan (Nottinghamshire cricketer) =

English cricketer

Personal information
- Full name: Charles Morgan
- Born: 7 February 1917; Clay Cross, Derbyshire, England
- Died: 11 July 2001 (aged 84); North Carolina, United States
- Batting: Right-handed
- Bowling: Right-arm off break

Domestic team information
- Years: Team
- 1946: Nottinghamshire

Career statistics
Competition	First-class
Matches	1
Runs scored	13
Batting average	6.50
100s/50s	–/–
Top score	13
Balls bowled	132
Wickets	–
Bowling average	–
5 wickets in innings	–
10 wickets in match	–
Best bowling	–
Catches/stumpings	–/–
- Source: Cricinfo, 2 March 2013

Charles Morgan (7 February 1917 – 11 July 2001) was an English cricketer. Morgan was a right-handed batsman who bowled right-arm off break. He was born at Clay Cross, Derbyshire.

Morgan made a single first-class appearance for Nottinghamshire against Middlesex in the 1946 County Championship at Trent Bridge. Nottinghamshire won the toss and elected to bat first, making 263 all out, during which Morgan was dismissed for a duck by Laurie Gray. He bowled 22 wicketless overs in Middlesex's first-innings of 484 all out, while in Nottinghamshire's second-innings of 182 he was the last man out, dismissed for 13 runs by Walter Robins. Middlesex won what was to be his only major appearance by an innings and 39 runs.

He died in North Carolina, United States on 11 July 2001.
