= Human Rights Review =

- Discipline: Human rights
- Language: English
- Edited by: George Andreopoulos

Publication details
- History: 1999-present
- Publisher: Springer Science+Business Media
- Frequency: Quarterly

Standard abbreviations
- ISO 4: Hum. Rights Rev.

Indexing
- ISSN: 1524-8879 (print); 1874-6306 (web)
- OCLC no.: 41284021

Links
- Journal homepage

Human Rights Review is a quarterly peer-reviewed academic journal established in 1999. It publishes research articles about human rights from various disciplinary perspectives using diverse methodologies. In addition, the journal welcomes pieces on human rights commentary from a practitioner's perspective as well as manuscripts concerning human rights education and research methods and resources. As an inter-disciplinary journal, Human Rights Review includes theoretical, historical and empirical analyses of human rights issues. It covers topics such as the moral and political interpretation and application of human rights legislation, terrorism, genocide, human security, sovereignty, globalization, cultural diversity, gender, human rights dilemmas in health care, and economic development. The editor-in-chief is George Andreopoulos (City University of New York).

== Abstracting and indexing ==
The journal is abstracted and indexed in:

- CSA Worldwide Political Science Abstracts
- EBSCO databases
- Expanded Academic ASAP
- International Bibliography of Periodical Literature
- International Bibliography of Book Reviews
- International Bibliography of the Social Sciences
- International Political Science Abstracts
- Peace Research Abstracts
- The Philosopher's Index

== See also ==
- Universal Declaration of Human Rights
- International human rights law
