= Charles A. Morgan III =

American psychiatrist

Charles A. Morgan III is an American psychiatrist who has studied post-traumatic stress disorder. He is a researcher with the National Center for Post-traumatic Stress Disorder who has worked on how stress interacts with the neurobiological basis of hardiness and resilience.

Morgan has been a faculty member at Yale University and the National Center for PTSD.

Morgan has written more than 100 peer-reviewed science papers about PTSD and the nature of acute stress on human cognition and military performance. Morgan's research has been conducted, in part, at military training sites (such as Survival School) because, unlike traditional laboratory settings, these venues offer an opportunity to evaluate the impact of realistic stress SERE. Survival School is a formal type of military training designed to prepare individuals to survive in the wild and to adhere to the US military code of conduct if captured by enemy forces.

In a June 2007 article on the adoption of Soviet extended interrogation methods by American interrogators, The New York Times quoted Morgan:

“How did something used as an example of what an unethical government would do become something we do?”

According to a 2015 report solicited by the American Psychological Association, and written by David H. Hoffman and other colleagues at the law firm Sidley Austin LLP, Dr. Morgan was a contract worker for the CIA in the early 2000s. Morgan was interviewed for this report. According to Hoffman, et al., Dr. Morgan worked under CIA psychologist Kirk Hubbard in the Agency's Research and Analysis Branch of the CIA's Operational Assessment Division, which the report describes as focused on psychological assessment of spies and potential spies.

From 2020, he is a series regular in Investigation Discovery show Signs of a Psychopath, where experts analyze killers to see which psychopathic traits they exhibited.
