= Charles Hale Morgan =

United States army officer (1834–1875)

Charles H. Morgan
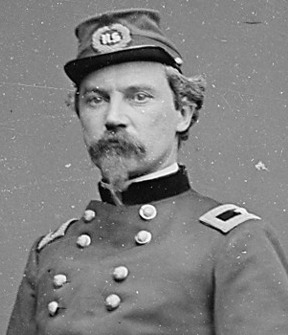
- Portrait of Morgan
- Born: November 6, 1834; Manlius, New York
- Died: December 20, 1875 (aged 41); Alcatraz Island, California
- Education: United States Military Academy
- Military career
- Allegiance: United States
- Branch: United States Army: U.S. Volunteers
- Service years: 1857–1875
- Rank: Brigadier general
- Battles: Utah Expedition; American Civil War

Charles Hale Morgan (November 6, 1834 – December 20, 1875) was an American soldier who fought in the Utah Expedition and the American Civil War, rising to the rank of brigadier-general for services in the field during the Civil War.

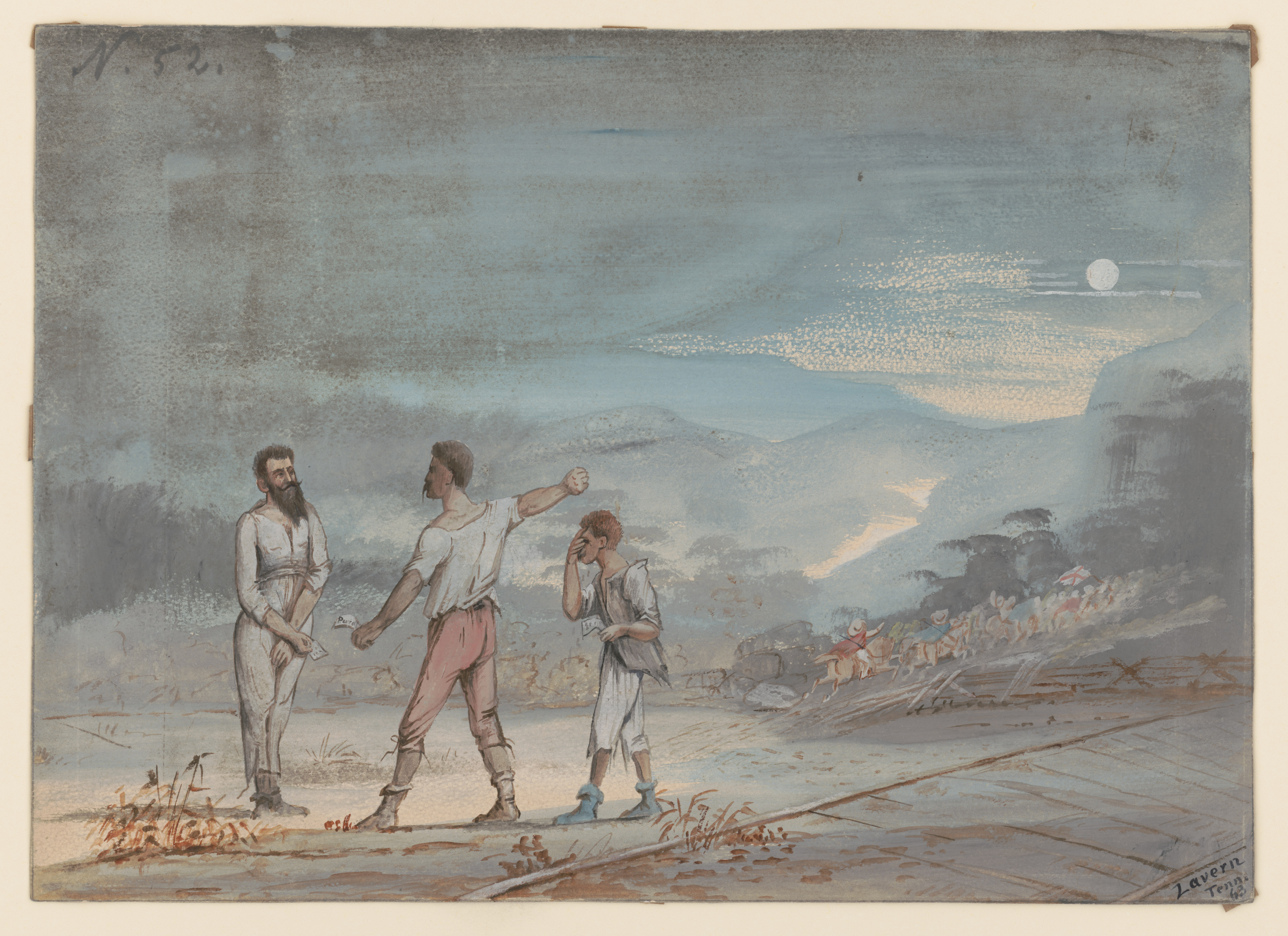
Captured by Morgan's cavalry at La Vergne, Tennessee, 1863, drawing by Adolph Metzner

== Life ==
Charles Hale Morgan was born in Manlius, New York, on November 6, 1834. He was graduated at the United States Military Academy in 1857, assigned to the 4th Artillery, and took part in the Utah Expedition of 1859. He became first lieutenant on April 1, 1861, and was engaged in the western Virginia operations and in the defences of Washington from December of that year till March, 1862. He served in the Army of the Potomac during the Peninsular campaign, was promoted captain on August 5, 1862, and in October appointed chief of artillery of the 2nd Corps. He held a volunteer commission as lieutenant-colonel on the staff from January 1, 1863, till May 21, 1865. He engaged in the Rappahannock campaign, and was brevetted major for services at Gettysburg, lieutenant-colonel for the action at Bristoe Station, Virginia, colonel for Spottsylvania, colonel of volunteers on August 1, 1864, for the Wilderness campaign, and brigadier-general of volunteers on December 2, 1864, for services as chief-of-staff of the 2nd Army Corps during the campaign before Richmond, Virginia. He assisted in organizing an army corps of veterans in Washington, D.C. in 1864–1865, and was assistant inspector-general and chief-of-staff to General Hancock, commanding the middle military division from February 22 till June 22, 1865. From that date till August 7, 1865, he was a member of the board to examine candidates for commissions in colored regiments. He was brevetted brigadier-general of the United States Army on March 13, 1865, for services in the field during the war, and made full brigadier-general of volunteers on May 21, 1865. He was mustered out of the volunteer service on January 15, 1866, and from March 10 to June 26, 1866, served on a board of officers to make recommendations for brevet promotions in the army. He was on recruiting service from August 9, 1860, till April 15, 1867, and became major of the 4th Artillery on February 5, 1867. He then served in the artillery-school at Fortress Monroe and other stations on the Atlantic coast, and at the time of his death commanded Alcatraz Island, California. He died on Alcatraz Island on December 20, 1875.

== Sources ==
- Cullum, George Washington (1891). "Charles H. Morgan". Register of Officers and Graduates of the United States Military Academy. 3rd ed. Vol. 2. Boston and New York: Houghton, Mifflin and Company; Cambridge, MA: The Riverside Press. pp. 682–683.
- Johnson, R.; Brown, J. H., eds. (1904). "Morgan, Charles Hale". The Twentieth Century Biographical Dictionary of Notable Americans. Vol. 7. Boston: The Biographical Society. n.p.
- Warner, Ezra J. (1964). "Charles Hale Morgan". Generals in Blue: Lives of the Union Commanders. Baton Rouge: Louisiana State University Press. pp. 331–332.

Attribution:

- Wilson, J. G.; Fiske, J., eds. (1888). "Morgan, Charles Hale". Appletons' Cyclopædia of American Biography. Vol. 4. New York: D. Appleton and Company. pp. 395–396.
