= Darius Rejali =

Iranian-born American academic

Darius Rejali (born c. 1959) is an Iranian-born American academic specialized on torture, who taught political science at Reed College.

== Biography ==
Rejali obtained a Bachelor of Arts at Swarthmore College in 1981, a master in 1983, and a PhD in political science from McGill University in 1987.

He joined Reed College as assistant professor in 1989, rose to associate professor in 1994, and has held a chair of Political Science since 2003. From 2000, he served at the board of the Human Rights Review.

He published Torture and Modernity: Self, Society and State in Modern Iran in 1994, and Torture and Democracy in 2007, which won the 2007 Human Rights Book of the Year Award from the American Political Science Association, and also the biennial 2009 Raphael Lemkin Award from the Institute for the Study of Genocide .
