= Torture in international law =

Most widely accepted definition of torture and its ubiquitous prohibition

The prohibition of torture is a peremptory norm in public international law—meaning that it is forbidden under all circumstances—as well as being forbidden by international treaties such as the United Nations Convention Against Torture.

== United Nations Convention Against Torture ==
The United Nations Convention against Torture and Other Cruel, Inhuman or Degrading Treatment or Punishment came into force in June 1987. The 4 most relevant articles are Articles 1, 2, 3, and 16.

Article 1

1. For the purposes of this Convention, the word "torture" means any act by which severe pain or suffering, whether physical or mental, is intentionally inflicted on a person for such purposes as obtaining from him or third person information or a confession, punishing him for an act he or a third person has committed or is suspected of having committed, or intimidating or coercing him or a third person, or for any reason based on discrimination of any kind, when such pain or suffering is inflicted by or at the instigation of or with the consent or acquiescence of a public official or other person acting in an official capacity. It does not include pain or suffering arising only from, inherent in or incidental to lawful sanctions.

2. This article is without prejudice to any international instrument or national legislation which does or may contain provisions of wider application.

Article 2

1. Each State Party shall take effective legislative, administrative, judicial or other measures to prevent acts of torture in any territory under its jurisdiction.
2. No exceptional circumstances whatsoever, whether a state of war or a threat of war, internal political instability or any other public emergency, may be invoked as a justification of torture.

3. An order from a superior officer or a public authority may not be invoked as a justification of torture.

Article 3

1. No State Party shall expel, return ("refouler") or extradite a person to another State where there are substantial grounds for believing that he would be in danger of being subjected to torture.

2. For the purpose of determining whether there are such grounds, the competent authorities shall take into account all relevant considerations including, where applicable, the existence in the State concerned of a consistent pattern of gross, flagrant or mass violations of human rights.

Article 16

1. Each State Party shall undertake to prevent in any territory under its jurisdiction other acts of cruel, inhuman or degrading treatment or punishment which do not amount to torture as defined in Article I when such acts are committed by or at the instigation of or with the consent or acquiescence of a public official or other person acting in an official capacity. In particular, the obligations contained in articles 10, 11, 12 and 13 shall apply with the substitution for references to torture of references to other forms of cruel, inhuman or degrading treatment or punishment.

2. The provisions of this Convention are without prejudice to the provisions of any other international instrument or national law which prohibits cruel, inhuman or degrading treatment or punishment or which relates to extradition or expulsion.

Map of the world with parties to the United Nations Convention Against Torture shaded dark green, states that have signed but not ratified the treaty in yellow, and non-parties in gray

Note several points:

- Article 1: Torture is "severe pain or suffering". The European Court of Human Rights (ECHR) influences discussions on this area of international law. See the section Other conventions for more details on the ECHR ruling.
- Article 2: There are "no exceptional circumstances whatsoever where a state can use torture and not break its treaty obligations."
- Article 16: Obliges signatories to prevent "acts of cruel, inhuman or degrading treatment or punishment", in all territories under their jurisdiction. (Note: When ratifying the treaty the United States added a reservation that the definition of "cruel, inhuman or degrading treatment or punishment" meant "the cruel, unusual and inhumane treatment or punishment prohibited by the Fifth, Eighth, and/or Fourteenth Amendments to the Constitution of the United States."(Yee, Sienho (2004). International crime and punishment: selected issues, University Press of America, ISBN 0-7618-2887-7, ISBN 978-0-7618-2887-7 p. 208, Footnote 18. cites Convention Against Torture, Annex I,I.). See also Torture and the United States.) (Note: The unanimous Law Lords judgment on 8 December 2005 ruled that, under English law tradition, "torture and its fruits" could not be used in court (Torture evidence inadmissible in UK courts, Lords rules by Staff and agencies in The Guardian 8 December 2005). But the information thus obtained could be used by the British police and security services as "it would be ludicrous for them to disregard information about a ticking bomb if it had been procured by torture." (Torture ruling's international impact by Jon Silverman BBC 8 December 2005))

== Optional Protocol to the UN Convention Against Torture ==
The Optional Protocol to the Convention Against Torture (OPCAT) entered into force on 22 June 2006 as an important addition to the UNCAT. As stated in Article 1, the purpose of the protocol is to "establish a system of regular visits undertaken by independent international and national bodies to places where people are deprived of their liberty, in order to prevent torture and other cruel, inhuman or degrading treatment or punishment." Each state ratifying the OPCAT, according to Article 17, is responsible for creating or maintaining at least one independent national preventive mechanism for torture prevention at the domestic level.

== UN Special Rapporteur on Torture ==
The United Nations Commission on Human Rights in 1985 decided to appoint an expert, a special rapporteur, to examine questions relevant to torture. The position has been extended up to date. On 1 November 2016, Prof. Nils Melzer, took up the function of UN Special Rapporteur on Torture. He warned that specific weapons and riot control devices used by police and security forces could be illegal.

== Rome Statute of the International Criminal Court ==
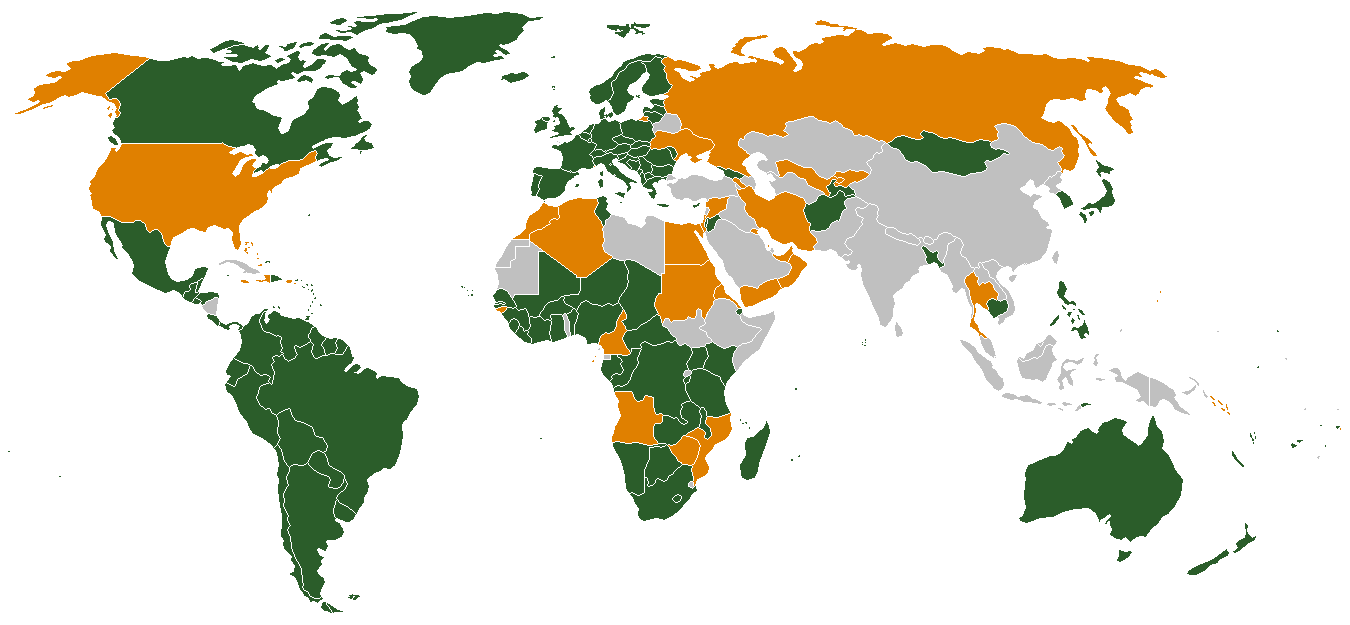
Map of the world with the states parties to the International Criminal Court (as of May 2013) shown in green, states that have signed but not ratified the treaty in orange, and non-parties in gray

The Rome Statute, which established the International Criminal Court (ICC), provides for criminal prosecution of individuals responsible for genocide, war crimes, and crimes against humanity. The statute defines torture as "intentional infliction of severe pain or suffering, whether physical or mental, upon a person in the custody or under the control of the accused; except that torture shall not include pain or suffering arising only from, inherent in or incidental to, lawful sanctions". Under Article 7 of the statute, torture may be considered a crime against humanity "when committed as part of a widespread or systematic attack directed against any civilian population, with knowledge of the attack". Article 8 of the statute provides that torture may also, under certain circumstances, be prosecuted as a war crime.

The ICC came into existence on 1 July 2002 and can only prosecute crimes committed on or after that date. The court can generally exercise jurisdiction only in cases where the accused is a national of a state party to the Rome Statute, the alleged crime took place on the territory of a state party, or a situation is referred to the court by the United Nations Security Council. The court is designed to complement existing national judicial systems: it can exercise its jurisdiction only when national courts are unwilling or unable to investigate or prosecute such crimes. Primary responsibility to investigate and punish crimes is therefore reserved to individual states.

== Geneva Conventions ==
The four Geneva Conventions provide protection for individuals who fulfills the criteria of protected persons in an international armed conflict. The conventions do not clearly divide people into combatant and non-combatant roles. The conventions refer to:

- "wounded and sick combatants or non-combatants"
- "civilian persons who take no part in hostilities, and who, while they reside in the zones, perform no work of a military character"
- "Members of the armed forces of a Party to the conflict as well as members of militias or volunteer corps forming part of such armed forces"
- "Members of other militias and members of other volunteer corps, including those of organized resistance movements belonging to a Party to the conflict and operating in or outside their own territory, even if this territory is occupied"
- "Members of regular armed forces who profess allegiance to a government or an authority not recognized by the Detaining Power"
- "Persons who accompany the armed forces without actually being members thereof, such as civilian members of military aircraft crews, war correspondents, supply contractors, members of labour units or of services responsible for the welfare of the armed forces"
- "Members of crews, including masters, pilots, and apprentices, of the merchant marine and the crews of civil aircraft of the Parties to the conflict"
- "Inhabitants of a non-occupied territory, who on the approach of the enemy spontaneously take up arms to resist the invading forces, without having had time to form themselves into regular armed units".

The first (GCI), second (GCII), third (GCIII), and fourth (GCIV) Geneva Conventions are the four most relevant for the treatment of the victims of conflicts. All treaties states in Article 3, in similar wording, that in a non-international armed conflict, "Persons taking no active part in the hostilities, including members of armed forces who have laid down their arms... shall in all circumstances be treated humanely." The treaty also states that there must not be any "violence to life and person, in particular murder of all kinds, mutilation, cruel treatment and torture" or "outrages upon personal dignity, in particular, humiliating and degrading treatment".

GCI covers wounded combatants in an international armed conflict. Under Article 12, members of the armed forces who are sick or wounded "shall be respected and protected in all circumstances. They shall be treated humanely and cared for by the Party to the conflict in whose power they may be, without any adverse distinction founded on sex, race, nationality, religion, political opinions, or any other similar criteria. Any attempts upon their lives, or violence to their persons, shall be strictly prohibited; in particular, they shall not be murdered or exterminated, subjected to torture or to biological experiments".

GCII covers shipwreck survivors at sea in an international armed conflict. Under Article 12, persons "who are at sea and who are wounded, sick or shipwrecked, shall be respected and protected in all circumstances, it being understood that the term "shipwreck" means shipwreck from any cause and includes forced landings at sea by or from aircraft. Such persons shall be treated humanely and cared for by the Parties to the conflict in whose power they may be, without any adverse distinction founded on sex, race, nationality, religion, political opinions, or any other similar criteria. Any attempts upon their lives, or violence to their persons, shall be strictly prohibited; in particular, they shall not be murdered or exterminated, subjected to torture or to biological experiments".

GCIII covers the treatment of prisoners of war (POWs) in an international armed conflict. In particular, Article 17 says that "No physical or mental torture, nor any other form of coercion, may be inflicted on prisoners of war to secure from them information of any kind whatever. Prisoners of war who refuse to answer may not be threatened, insulted or exposed to unpleasant or disadvantageous treatment of any kind." POW status under GCIII has far fewer exemptions than "Protected Person" status under GCIV. Captured combatants in an international armed conflict automatically have the protection of GCIII and are POWs under GCIII unless they are determined by a competent tribunal to not be a POW (GCIII Article 5).

GCIV covers most civilians in an international armed conflict, and says they are usually "Protected Persons" (see exemptions section immediately after this for those who are not). Under Article 32, civilians have the right to protection from "murder, torture, corporal punishments, mutilation, and medical or scientific experiments...but also to any other measures of brutality whether applied by civilian or military agents."

=== Geneva Convention IV exemptions ===
GCIV provides an important exemption:

Where in the territory of a Party to the conflict, the latter is satisfied that an individual protected person is definitely suspected of or engaged in activities hostile to the security of the State, such individual person shall not be entitled to claim such rights and privileges under the present Convention [ie GCIV] as would ... be prejudicial to the security of such State ... In each case, such persons shall nevertheless be treated with humanity (GCIV Article 5)

Also, persons under their own national authority and nationals of a State not bound by the convention are not protected by it, and nationals of a neutral State in the territory of a combatant State and nationals of a co-belligerent State also cannot claim the protection of GCIV if their home state has normal diplomatic representation in the State that holds them (Article 4), as their diplomatic representatives can take steps to protect them. In other words, atrocities committed by belligerent troops against these non-protected persons in an international armed conflict are not war crimes.

The George W. Bush administration afforded fewer protections, under GCIII, to detainees in the "war on terror" by codifying the legal status of an "unlawful combatant". If there is a question of whether a person is a lawful combatant, he (or she) must be treated as a POW "until their status has been determined by a competent tribunal" (GCIII Article 5). If the tribunal decides that he is an unlawful combatant, he is not considered a protected person under GCIII. However, if he is a protected person under GCIV he still has some protection under GCIV and must be "treated with humanity and, in case of trial, shall not be deprived of the rights of fair and regular trial prescribed by the present Convention" (GCIV Article 5). (Note: "Every person in enemy hands must have some status under international law: he is either a prisoner of war and, as such, covered by the Third Convention, a civilian covered by the Fourth Convention, or again, a member of the medical personnel of the armed forces who is covered by the First Convention. There is no intermediate status; nobody in enemy hands can be outside the law. We feel that this is a satisfactory solution – not only satisfying to the mind but also, and above all, satisfactory from the humanitarian point of view.", because in the opinion of the ICRC "If civilians directly engage in hostilities, they are considered 'unlawful' or 'unprivileged' combatants or belligerents (the treaties of humanitarian law do not expressly contain these terms). They may be prosecuted under the domestic law of the detaining state for such action" (Jean Pictet (ed.) – Commentary: IV Geneva Convention Relative to the Protection of Civilian Persons in Time of War (1958) – 1994 reprint edition). Geneva Conventions Protocol I Article 51.3 also covers this interpretation "Civilians shall enjoy the protection afforded by this section, unless and for such time as they take a direct part in hostilities".)

=== Additional Protocols to the Geneva Conventions ===
There are two additional protocols to the Geneva Convention: Protocol I (1977), relating to the protection of victims of international armed conflicts and Protocol II (1977), relating to the protection of victims of non-international armed conflicts. These clarify and extend the definitions in some areas, but to date, many countries, including the United States, have either not signed them or have not ratified them.

Protocol I does not mention torture but it does affect the treatment of POWs and Protected Persons. In Article 5, the protocol explicitly involves "the appointment of Protecting Powers and of their substitute" to monitor that the Parties to the conflict are enforcing the Conventions. The protocol also broadens the definition of a lawful combatant in wars against "alien occupation, colonial domination, and racist regimes" to include those who carry arms openly but are not wearing uniforms, so that they are now lawful combatants and protected by the Geneva Conventions—although only if the Occupying Power has ratified Protocol I. Under the original conventions, combatants without a recognizable insignia could be treated as war criminals, and potentially be executed. It also mentions spies and defines who is a mercenary. Mercenaries and spies are considered an unlawful combatant, and not protected by the same conventions.

Protocol II "develops and supplements Article 3 [relating to the protection of victims of non-international armed conflicts] common to the Geneva Conventions of 12 August 1949 without modifying its existing conditions of application" (Article 1). Any person who does not take part in or ceased to take part in hostilities is entitled to humane treatment. Among the acts prohibited against these persons are, "Violence to the life, health and physical or mental well-being of persons, in particular, murder as well as cruel treatment such as torture, mutilation or any form of corporal punishment" (Article 4.a), "Outrages upon personal dignity, in particular humiliating and degrading treatment, rape, enforced prostitution and any form of indecent assault" (Article 4.e), and "Threats to commit any of the foregoing acts" (Article 4.h). Clauses in other articles implore humane treatment of enemy personnel in an internal conflict. These have a bearing on torture, but no other clauses explicitly mention torture.

== Other conventions ==
In accordance with the optional UN Standard Minimum Rules for the Treatment of Prisoners (1955), "corporal punishment, punishment by placing in a dark cell, and all cruel, inhuman or degrading punishments shall be completely prohibited as punishments for disciplinary offences." The International Covenant on Civil and Political Rights (16 December 1966) explicitly prohibits torture and "cruel, inhuman or degrading treatment or punishment" by signatories.

European agreements

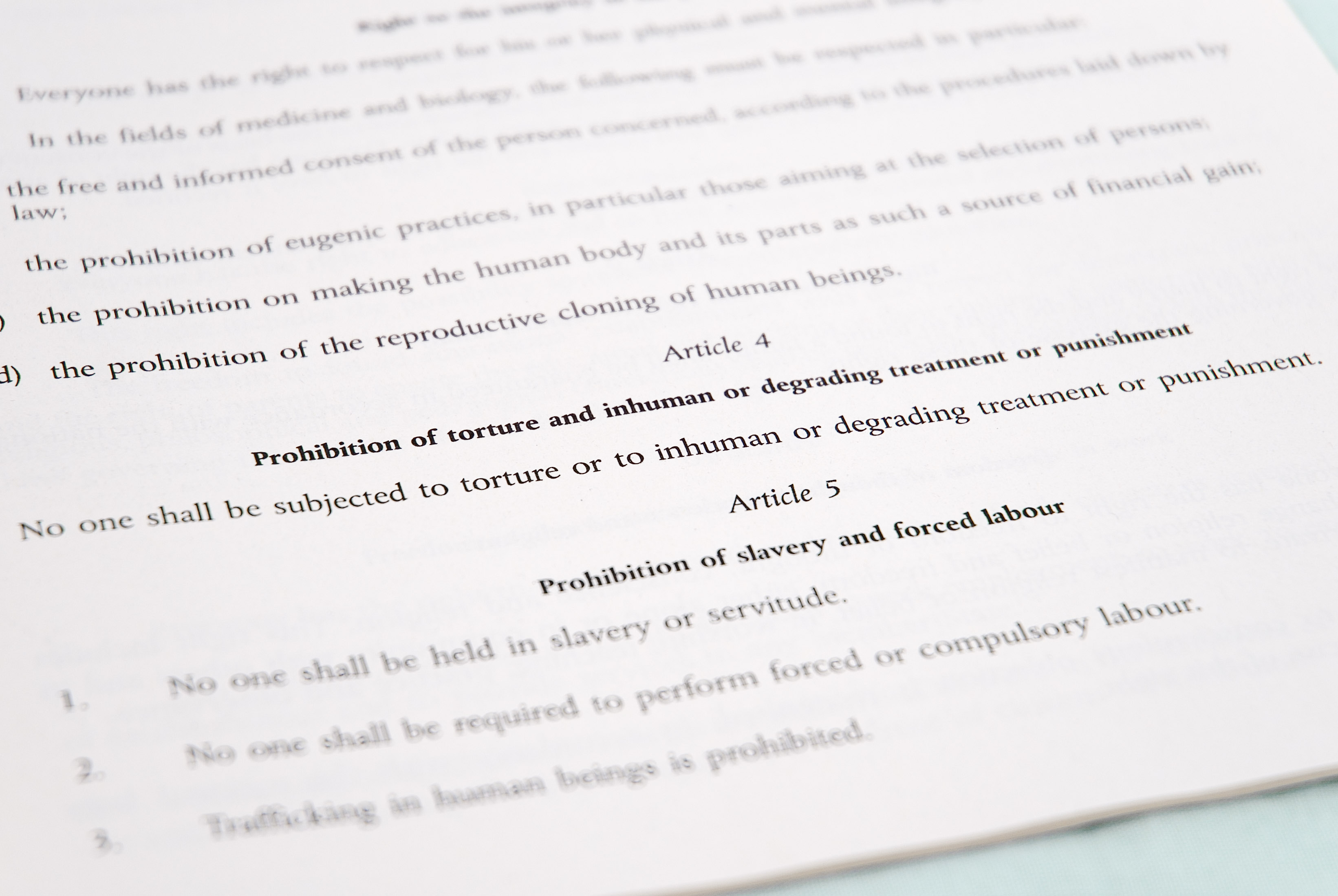
Article 4 of the Charter of Fundamental Rights of the European Union prohibits torture.

In 1950 during the Cold War, the participating member states of the Council of Europe signed the European Convention on Human Rights. The treaty was based on the UDHR. It included the provision for a court to interpret the treaty, and Article 3 "Prohibition of torture" stated; "No one shall be subjected to torture or to inhuman or degrading treatment or punishment."

In 1978, the European Court of Human Rights ruled that the five techniques of "sensory deprivation" were not torture as laid out in Article 3 of the European Convention on Human Rights, but were "inhuman or degrading treatment" (see Accusations of use of torture by United Kingdom for details). This case occurred nine years before the United Nations Convention Against Torture came into force and had an influence on thinking about what constitutes torture ever since.

On 26 November 1987, the member states of the Council of Europe, meeting at Strasbourg, adopted the European Convention for the Prevention of Torture and Inhuman or Degrading Treatment or Punishment (ECPT). Two additional Protocols amended the convention, which entered into force on 1 March 2002. The Convention set up the Committee for the Prevention of Torture to oversee compliance with its provisions.

Inter-American Convention

The Inter-American Convention to Prevent and Punish Torture, currently ratified by 18 nations of the Americas and in force since 28 February 1987, defines torture more expansively than the United Nations Convention Against Torture.

For the purposes of this Convention, torture shall be understood to be any act intentionally performed whereby physical or mental pain or suffering is inflicted on a person for purposes of a criminal investigation, as a means of intimidation, as personal punishment, as a preventive measure, as a penalty, or for any other purpose. Torture shall also be understood to be the use of methods upon a person intended to obliterate the personality of the victim or to diminish his physical or mental capacities, even if they do not cause physical pain or mental anguish. The concept of torture shall not include physical or mental pain or suffering that is inherent in or solely the consequence of lawful measures, provided that they do not include the performance of the acts or use of the methods referred to in this article.

== Supervision of anti-torture treaties ==
The Istanbul Protocol, an official UN document, is the first set of international guidelines for documentation of torture and its consequences. It became a United Nations official document in 1999.

Under the provisions of OPCAT that entered into force on 22 June 2006 independent international and national bodies regularly visit places where people are deprived of their liberty, to prevent torture and other cruel, inhuman or degrading treatment or punishment. Each state that ratified the OPCAT, according to Article 17, is responsible for creating or maintaining at least one independent national preventive mechanism for torture prevention at the domestic level.

The European Committee for the Prevention of Torture, citing Article 1 of the European Convention for the Prevention of Torture, states that it will, "by means of visits, examine the treatment of persons deprived of their liberty with a view to strengthening, if necessary, the protection of such persons from torture and from inhuman or degrading treatment or punishment".

In times of armed conflict between a signatory of the Geneva Conventions and another party, delegates of the International Committee of the Red Cross (ICRC) monitor the compliance of signatories to the Geneva Conventions, which includes monitoring the use of torture. Human rights organizations, such as Amnesty International, the World Organization Against Torture, and Association for the Prevention of Torture work actively to stop the use of torture throughout the world and publish reports on any activities they consider to be torture.

== See also ==
- Exclusion of evidence obtained under torture
