= Prisoners' rights in international law =

Prisoners' rights in international law are found in a number of international treaties. For the most part these treaties came into existence following the two World Wars and the body of law continues to be added to and amended.

== History ==
The events of World War I and World War II had a profound effect on international law due to the widespread denial of civil rights and liberties on the basis of racial, religious, and political discrimination. The systematic use of violence, including murder and ultimately genocide, the use of slave labor, abuse and murder of prisoners of war, deportations, and confiscation of property forced changes to the status quo. Over the proceeding decades, large scale changes began to occur in all areas of international law, and prisoners’ rights were no exception.

Now, there are international instruments

- the European Convention on Human Rights,
- the European Convention for the Prevention of Torture and Inhuman or Degrading Treatment or Punishment

Further there are recommendations which lay down codes by which prisoners should be dealt with. Foremost amongst them are

- the International Covenant on Civil and Political Rights,
- the UN Standard Minimum Rules for the Treatment of Prisoners,
- the Body of Principles for the Protection of All Persons under Any Form of Detention or Imprisonment
- the Convention on the Rights of Persons with Disabilities.
- the European Prison Rules.

== Third Geneva Convention ==
The Third Geneva Convention defines humanitarian protections for prisoners of war. Prisoners of war are defined as:

(1) Members of the armed forces of a Party to the conflict as well as members of militias or volunteer corps forming part of such armed forces.

(2) Members of other militias and members of other volunteer corps, including those of organized resistance movements, belonging to a party to the conflict and operating in or outside their own territory, even if this territory is occupied, provided that they fulfill the following conditions:

(a) that of being commanded by a person responsible for his subordinates;

(b) that of having a fixed distinctive sign recognizable at a distance;

(c) that of carrying arms openly;

(d) that of conducting their operations in accordance with the laws and customs of war.

(3) Members of regular armed forces who profess allegiance to a government or an authority not recognized by the Detaining Power.

(4) Persons who accompany the armed forces without actually being members thereof, such as civilian members of military aircraft crews, war correspondents, supply contractors, members of labour units or of services responsible for the welfare of the armed forces, provided that they have received authorization from the armed forces which they accompany, who shall provide them for that purpose with an identity card similar to the annexed model.

(5) Members of crews, including masters, pilots and apprentices, of the merchant marine and the crews of civil aircraft of the Parties to the conflict, who do not benefit by more favourable treatment under any other provisions of international law.

6) Inhabitants of a non-occupied territory, who on the approach of the enemy spontaneously take up arms to resist the invading forces, without having had time to form themselves into regular armed units, provided they carry arms openly and respect the laws and customs of war.

Prisoners of war may not renounce rights secured by the Conventions. Those rights include the rights to humane treatment which prohibits specifically violence causing death or seriously endangering health, or physical mutilation or scientific or medical experiments, protection from acts of intimidation, insults and public curiosity, protection from reprisals, exercise, protection from physical or mental torture, adequate physical and psychological treatment, to keep personal items including money, to be evacuated if the territory in which they are held becomes too dangerous, to adequate food, water, shelter and clothing, sanitary living conditions, religious freedom, and to complain. Detaining powers have the right to use appropriate force in the event of escape or a riot, to require prisoners to given their name and rank, and to utilize prisoners for labor as long the work doesn't have to do with the war effort.

The 1929 Geneva Convention on Prisoners of War was adopted in 1929 but was significantly revised and replaced by the Third Geneva Convention in 1949. The United Nations Security Council is the final international tribunal for all issues relating to the Geneva Conventions. All signatories to the UN Charter, of which there are 193, are bound by the Geneva Conventions.

== International Covenant on Civil and Political Rights ==
The International Covenant on Civil and Political Rights came into force 23 March 1976. Article 10 of the International Covenant on Civil and Political Rights provides that any person deprived of their liberty shall be treated with humanity and dignity. The article imposes a requirement of separation of prisoners in pre-trial detention from those already convicted of crimes, as well as a specific obligation to separate accused juvenile prisoners from adults and bring them before trial speedily. There is also a requirement that the focus of prisons should be reform and rehabilitation, not punishment. These provisions apply to those in prisons, hospitals (particularly psychiatric hospitals), detention facilities, correction facilities or any other facility in which a person is deprived of their liberty. The article complements article 7 of the Covenant, which bans torture or other cruel, inhumane or degrading treatment, by guaranteeing those deprived of their liberty with the same conditions as that set for free persons.

== UN Standard Minimum Rules for the Treatment of Prisoners ==
The United Nations Standard Minimum Rules for the Treatment of Prisoners came into force in 1955. The standards set out by the UN are not legally binding but offer guidelines in international and municipal law with respect to any person held in any form of custody. They are generally regarded as being good principle and practice for the management of custodial facilities. The document sets out standards for those in custody which covers registration, personal hygiene, clothing and bedding, food, exercise and sport, medical services, discipline and punishment, instruments of restraint, information to and complaints by prisoners, contact with the outside world, books, religion, retentions of prisoners’ property, notification of death, illness, transfer, removal of prisoners, institutional personnel and inspection of facilities. It also sets out guidelines for prisoners under sentence which further includes treatment, classification and individualisation, privileges, work, educations and recreations, and social relations and after-care. There are also special provisions for insane and mentally abnormal prisoners, prisoners under arrest or awaiting trial, civil prisoners and persons arrested or detained without charge.

== European Convention for the Prevention of Torture and Inhuman or Degrading Treatment or Punishment ==
The European Convention for the Prevention of Torture and Inhuman or Degrading Treatment or Punishment entered into force on 1 March 2002. The Convention establishes the European Committee for the Prevention of Torture and Inhuman or Degrading Treatment or Punishment (the Committee). The Committee is permitted to visit all places of detention, defined by the convention as "any place within its jurisdiction where persons are deprived of their liberty by a public authority." Once a state government is notified of the intention of the Committee to carry out a visit it is required to allow access to the territory with the right to free travel without restriction, full information of the facility in question, unlimited access to the facility and free movement within it, the right to interview any person being held within the facility, communicate freely with any person whom it believes can supply relevant information and access to any other information which the Committee feels is necessary to carry out its task. All information gathered is confidential. In exceptional circumstances a state may make representations based on grounds of national defence, public safety, serious disorder in custodial facilities against a visit to a certain place or at a certain time. After each visit a report is drawn up with any possible suggestions to the state in question.

== Convention on the Rights of Persons with Disabilities ==
The Convention on the Rights of Persons with Disabilities entered into force on 30 March 2007 and has 154 state parties. The Convention’s purpose is to "promote, protect and ensure the full and equal enjoyment of all human rights and fundamental freedoms by all persons with disabilities, and to promote respect for their inherent dignity." Persons with disabilities are defined as those "who have long-term physical, mental, intellectual or sensory impairments which in interaction with various barriers may hinder their full and effective participation in society on an equal basis with others."" Article 13 of the Convention relates to access to justice for persons with disability. It provides that in order to "ensure effective access to justice for persons with disabilities, States Parties shall promote appropriate training for those working in the field of administration of justice, including police and prison staff."

== Breaches of prisoners' rights in international law ==
=== United States ===
Guantanamo Bay

The United States government has been accused of many breaches of prisoners’ rights in international law. The most publicized case is the detention facility it maintains in Guantanamo Bay, Cuba. The American government claimed that the facility was not covered by the Geneva Conventions protecting prisoners of war as the detainees were ‘enemy combatants’. Regardless of the status accorded to detainees, international law still prohibits torture. It is now clear that the CIA allowed water boarding, which is a breach of international law which prohibits cruel, humiliating or degrading treatment.

Afghanistan

In Afghanistan, US soldiers are accused of abusing prisoners in a secret prison in Bagram Air Base. The prisoners held there were exposed to extreme temperatures, not given adequate food, bedding, or natural light and religious duties were interfered with. There are also claims of abuse in Shebarghan prison in northern Afghanistan for which America is jointly responsible with the Afghan government. Shebarghan prison is claimed to be overcrowded with inadequate bathing and ablution facilities, as well as lack of food and medical care.

Iraq

In 2003, accusations started to emerge of prisoner abuse in Abu Ghraib prison. US soldiers at Abu Ghraib prison serving there were accused of beating prisoners, forcing prisoners to strip, forcing prisoners to masturbate, threatening prisoners with dogs, smearing prisoners with faeces, making prisoners simulate sex and form naked piles. There was also accusations that prisoners were raped, sodomised and beaten to death.
