= Committee for the Prevention of Torture =

Council of Europe anti-torture agency

- Abbreviation: CPT
- Formation: 1987
- Type: INGO
- Region served: Europe
- Official language: English, French
- Website: CPT Official website

The European Committee for the Prevention of Torture and Inhuman or Degrading Treatment or Punishment or shortly Committee for the Prevention of Torture (CPT) is the anti-torture committee of the Council of Europe. Founded to enforce the European Convention for the Prevention of Torture and Inhuman or Degrading Treatment or Punishment, the CPT visits places of imprisonment in signatory countries and issues reports on violations of the convention.

== Founding ==
The CPT was founded on the basis of the European Convention for the Prevention of Torture and Inhuman or Degrading Treatment or Punishment (1987), which came into force in February 1989. It allows the CPT to visit all "places of detention" of the member states of the Council of Europe. Places of detention, as defined by the convention, are all places in which people are held without their consent. In the first place, this covers police cells, jails, prisons and closed psychiatric institutions, but also immigration detention centres, old people's homes and the like. The visits are carried out by small teams of CPT members, who usually call-in additional experts. After each visit, a report about the findings and recommendations is drawn up and sent to the respective government. The findings deal not so much with individual cases of torture but with the identification of situations at risk that may lead to torture. The CPT reports are confidential and are published only if the government so requests. But political pressure on the governments is strong to make the report public. Only in the rare case in which governments refuse to publish and the CPT has clear evidence of a practice of torture, the CPT may make a unilateral "public statement".

All Council of Europe member states have ratified the Convention for the Prevention of Torture. Protocol No. 1 to the convention, which entered into force on 1 March 2002, provides for non-member states of the Council of Europe to accede to the convention, but none have been invited to do so to date.

After 20 years of experience, this European model was adapted and generalised by the United Nations through the OPCAT optional protocol to the UN Convention Against Torture (2006).

Members of the CPT are independent and impartial experts from a variety of backgrounds, including law, medicine and the justice system. They are elected for a four-year term by the Committee of Ministers, the Council of Europe's decision-making body, and can be re-elected twice. One member is elected in respect of each member state.

== A system of visits ==
Visits are carried out by delegations, usually of two or more CPT members, accompanied by members of the committee's Secretariat and, if necessary, by experts and interpreters. The member elected in respect of the country being visited does not join the delegation.

CPT delegations visit contracting states periodically but may organise additional "ad hoc" visits if necessary. The committee must notify the state concerned but need not specify the period between notification and the actual visit, which, in exceptional circumstances, may be carried out immediately after notification. Governments' objections to the time or place of a visit can only be justified on grounds of national defence, public safety, serious disorder, the medical condition of a person or that an urgent interrogation relating to a serious crime is in progress. In such cases the state must immediately take steps to enable the committee to visit as soon as possible.

== Unlimited access, co-operation, and confidentiality ==
Under the convention, CPT delegations have unlimited access to places of detention and the right to move inside such places without restriction. They interview persons deprived of their liberty in private and communicate freely with anyone who can provide information.

The recommendations which the CPT may formulate on the basis of facts found during the visit, are included in a report which is sent to the state concerned. This report is the starting point for an ongoing dialogue with the state concerned.

The CPT has two guiding principles: co-operation and confidentiality. Co-operation with the national authority is at the heart of the convention, since the aim is to protect persons deprived of their liberty rather than to condemn states for abuses. The committee therefore meets in camera and its reports are strictly confidential. Nevertheless, if a country fails to co-operate or refuses to improve the situation in the light of the committee's recommendations, the CPT may decide to make a public statement.

Of course, the state itself may request publication of the committee's report, together with its comments. In addition, the CPT draws up a general report on its activities every year, which is made public.

== See also ==
- United Nations Convention Against Torture § Committee against Torture
- European Court of Human Rights
- European Prison Rules
- Article 3 of the European Convention on Human Rights
