= Principles on Effective Interviewing =

Framework for effective and fair interviewing

The Méndez Principles
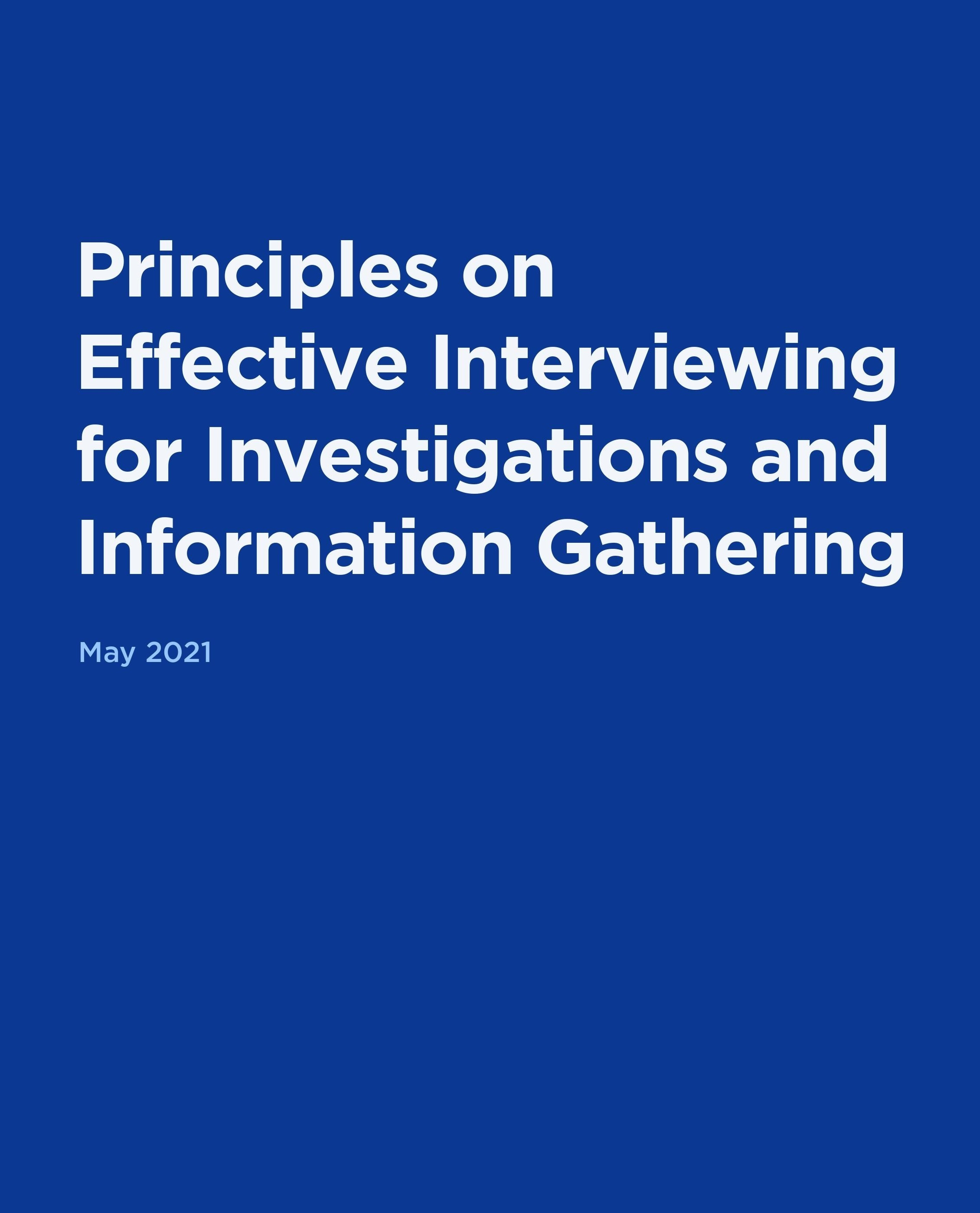
- Created: May 2021
- Purpose: Establishment of framework for effective investigative interviewing based on human rights and science

Official website
- https://interviewingprinciples.com/

The Principles on Effective Interviewing for Investigations and Information Gathering, also known as the Méndez Principles, are a set of principles designed to ensure that investigative interviews are conducted in a way that respects human rights while supporting the collection of accurate and reliable information. The principles were published in 2021, and the writing of them was coordinated by the Association for the Prevention of Torture (APT), the Anti-Torture Initiative at American University Washington College of Law, and the Norwegian Centre for Human Rights. The project was organized by a global steering committee with a drafting group and an advisory council.

The short name Méndez Principles is used in reference to Juan E. Méndez, who co-chaired the steering committee together with Mark Thompson, former secretary-general for the APT. Work on the document took four years and was started after a report submitted by Méndez to the United Nations General Assembly in 2016.

The principles are designed as an evidence-based policy and framework for investigative interviewing. They are intended to apply to interviews conducted by law enforcement, intelligence, military, immigration, customs, and related administrative authorities, and cover interactions with suspects, witnesses, victims, and other persons of interest. The stated aim of the principles is to ensure that interviews are conducted in respect of human rights while supporting the collection of accurate and reliable information.

== Background ==
Juan E. Mendez of Argentina was the United Nations Special Rapporteur on Torture and Other Cruel, Inhuman or Degrading Treatment or Punishment from 2010 to 2016. Nearing the end of his term in 2016, he filed a report to the UN General Assembly that proposed to work on establishing international standards for investigative interviewing. He then became part of the project to create such standards, co-chairing a steering committee with 15 members together with Mark Thompson. The group was supported by a drafting group of 20 people and an advisory council with 80 members.

The Méndez Principles build on research from disciplines studying interviews, and reflects the observation that research points towards the effectiveness of information-gathering, rapport-based and non-coercive methods of interviewing, rather than interrogation using torture or force. The international and general nature of the Méndez Principles can be seen as developed from a growing institutional employment of non-coercive investigative interviewing developed in different countries, and are intended to be informed by science, ethics and law.

An institutional partnership between the Association for the Prevention of Torture, the Norwegian Centre for Human Rights and the Anti-Torture Initiative at the American University Washington College of Law was formed in 2018 to coordinate the collaboration. Work on the principles took four years and consisted of consulations with relevant stakeholders.

The final draft was approved on 6 May 2021. The document was published 17 May 2021, and a launch event for the document was held on 9 June 2021, opened by Michelle Bachelet, then UN High Commissioner for Human Rights.

== Adoption and support ==
In 2023, the European Cooperation in Science and Technology (COST) launched the project "ImpleMéndez" to establish networks to implement the principles. COST funds the project, which runs through 2027.

At the UN General Assembly, a joint statement from 53 countries in support of the principles was delivered in October 2022. The 2024 UN Manual on Investigative Interviewing for Criminal Investigation is designed to outline practical implementation methods of the Méndez Principles. It was created by the UN Department of Peace Operations, the Office of the High Commissioner for Human Rights, and the UN Office on Drugs and Crime. Expressions of support have also come from other UN and EU institutions and the Organization for Security and Co-operation in Europe (OSCE) and the African Commission on Human and Peoples' Rights (ACHPR).

The Association for the Prevention of Torture has published a list of UN documents that mention the principles. It includes a mention in June 2024 by Brazil’s Superior Court of Justice, which cited the Méndez Principles in a judgment addressing coercive interviewing and concerns about confession-driven investigations.

The Ministry of Justice of Poland has translated the Méndez Principles into Polish to promote their accessibility and integration into domestic practice.

== See also ==
- Enhanced interrogation techniques – Program of torture by the US government
- Exclusion of evidence obtained under torture – Overview of the laws and history of excluding evidence obtained under torture
