= Association for the Prevention of Torture =

The Association for the Prevention of Torture (APT) is an international non-government organization focused on the prevention of torture and other acts considered as cruel, inhuman or degrading treatment. The organization was founded in 1977 by Jean-Jacques Gautier under the name Swiss Committee against Torture.

APT seeks to prevent torture through three integrated elements:

- Effective monitoring
- Legal and policy frameworks
- Ensuring determination and capability on the part of international and national actors

== Founder Biography ==
Jean Jacques Gautier was born in 1912 in Chene-Bourgeries, Geneva. He was raised by a family of influential bankers, and he later became an associate of the Pictet and Cie private bank. In 1973, Amnesty International started a campaign to abolish the practices of torture. This influenced Gautier because he believed that torture was "the absolute weapon in the service of the powers of the evil, the shame of our century." Being greatly influenced by his Christian beliefs and the anti torture movement, Gautier entered early retirement and dedicated the remainder of his life to stopping torture from endangering the lives of innocent people.

== Activities ==
The APT pursues its goals through four broad categories of activities.

=== Develop legal instruments ===
APT offers legal advice and is involved in the drafting of legal instruments to prevent torture. APT has contributed to the UN Convention Against Torture and its Optional Protocol (OPCAT); the European Convention for the Prevention of Torture and the Robben Island Guidelines for the Prohibition and Prevention of Torture in Africa.

=== Advocate for preventive mechanisms ===
APT engages in direct advocacy at several levels.

=== Strengthen capacities ===
APT works with national, regional, and international partners to strengthen their capacity to prevent torture. APT advises on specific techniques for implementing monitoring, training in legal issues, and legislative reform.

=== Produce practical tools ===
APT develops materials and publishes various resources.

== Achievements ==
The Association for the Prevention of Torture has worked since 1977 to prevent torture around the world. There are regional, national and international committees that oversee places of detention in which people are being denied of their civil liberties. These detention centers are often closed environments such as prisons or immigration centers that prevent people from expressing their inalienable rights. The APT has taken preventative measures to ensure that individuals who have been incarcerated or taken into custody unjustly are able to have access to a lawyer and doctor, and that family members are also notified when their relatives are incarcerated to prevent and reduce the possibility of torture occurring. The APT has also been successful in setting up regular visits to detention camps and ensuring that no malpractices are occurring among people who are being detained. Additionally, the APT has also composed a guide about anti torture legislation that details the national laws that must be followed to take action against torturous acts. Since the APT partnered with the Optional Protocol to the UN Convention Against Torture (OPCAT) many places of detention have been shut down. Also, in other instances the living conditions of some detention camps have improved in terms of food and housing arrangements. These improvements are due to the communicative efforts between national organizations and the APT.

== Regional Expansion ==
The APT works with countries in Africa, the Americas, Pacific Asia, Europe and Central Asia, Middle East and North Africa and other countries to carry out plans for preventing acts of torture. Indonesia organized a trip for students to visit Geneva with the help of the APT. The students spent the day at a workshop to develop strategies to create a system that monitors the conditions of a detention camp. The APT hopes that its support for Indonesian national institutions will form the National Preventive Mechanism in Indonesia which is the process of ratifying OPCAT to act as a supporting system in efforts to rid any areas of Indonesia that are engaging in cruel acts of torture.

== Structure and Partnerships ==
The APT Board is elected annually by the APT General Assembly and is composed of 16 experts from 10 countries. The full Board meets twice a year to approve the strategic plan and budget for the coming year and to review activities from the previous period. Some members of the board are involved more frequently in supervising, advising, or participating in APT activities.

The APT has consultative status the following organizations:

- United Nations Economic and Social Council
- Organisation of American States
- Council of Europe
- African Commission on Human and Peoples' Rights
- Organisation internationale de la Francophonie

The APT is a member of:

- Swiss Coalition for the International Criminal Court
- The Coalition of International NGOs Against Torture (CINAT)
- The International Detention Coalition

APT has been recognized with the following awards:

- Human Rights Prize of the French Republic, 2004
- Prize of the Foundation for Geneva, 2004
- Chico Mendes Resistance Prize, 2007

== Purpose ==
The APT is a non-government association that is focused on ensuring that no human being is ever subjected to torture or any form of cruel or inhumane treatment. The vision of the APT is to protect the liberties of people who have been denied or cheated out of their basic human rights. Every person is entitled to being treated with respect and given opportunities to better themselves and their economic status. The APT is also very objective in its pursuits to have an open mind and non discriminatory ideal towards helping any one who is being treated unjustly. Overall, the APT has set an international standard by which over 80 countries are in agreement to recognize that torture is an inhumane act that affects people in developing countries. The APT has ongoing projects in place to ensure that acts of torture are not legitimized in any form.

== See also ==
- United Nations Convention Against Torture
