= Torreggiani and Others v. Italy =

2013 European Court of Human Rights pilot judgment

Decided 8 January 2013
- Full case name: Torreggiani and Others v. Italy
- Case: 43517/09, 46882/09, 55400/09, 57875/09, 61535/09, 35315/10, 37818/10
- Chamber: Second Section
- Language of proceedings: French
- Nationality of parties: Italian
- Procedural history: Pilot judgment

Ruling
- Violation of Article 3; Italy required to introduce effective domestic remedies for prison overcrowding within one year

Court composition
- President; Danutė Jočienė
- Judges: Guido Raimondi; Peer Lorenzen; Dragoljub Popović; Işıl Karakaş; Paulo Pinto de Albuquerque; Helen Keller

Instruments cited
- Article 3, Article 46

Torreggiani and Others v. Italy (applications nos. 43517/09 and six others) is a pilot judgment delivered by the European Court of Human Rights on 8 January 2013. The Court ruled that the conditions in which seven prisoners were held in the prisons of Busto Arsizio and Piacenza were inhuman and degrading, in breach of Article 3 of the European Convention on Human Rights. The ruling also held that overcrowding in Italian prisons was a systemic breach, not limited to specific cases. The Court ordered Italy to introduce, within one year, remedies able to prevent such conditions and to compensate those who had been subjected to them.

In the following years Italy reduced its prison population and introduced preventive and compensatory remedies in 2013 and 2014. In 2016 the Committee of Ministers of the Council of Europe closed its supervision of the judgment's execution.

After the closure of the supervision the prison population rose again. By 2026 overcrowding had returned to the levels of 2010–2013 that had led to the judgment. Violations of Article 3 are now ruled on by Italian supervisory courts, under the remedies introduced after the judgment. The courts accepted 6,539 complaints in 2025 only.

== Background ==
According to the figures cited by the Court, in 2010 Italy's 206 prisons held 67,961 people against a maximum planned capacity of 45,000, a national overcrowding rate of 151 per cent. On 13 January 2010 the Italian government declared a one-year national state of emergency because of prison overcrowding, and in June 2010 it adopted a plan to build new places. On 13 April 2012 the prisons held 66,585 inmates, a rate of 148 per cent.

The Court had already found a violation of Article 3 caused by overcrowding in an Italian prison in Sulejmanovic v. Italy (2009), concerning an inmate of Rebibbia prison in Rome who between November 2002 and April 2003 had about 2.7 square metres of personal space. That ruling, limited to specific cases, paved the way to the Torreggiani decision, which instead extended the ruling to the entire prison system.

== Facts ==
The seven applicants had been held in the prisons of Busto Arsizio and Piacenza for periods ranging from 14 to 54 months. Each said he had shared a cell of 9 square metres with two other inmates, which left less than 3 square metres of personal space. They also complained of a lack of hot water, which limited their use of the showers, and the Piacenza applicants of poor lighting caused by the multiple layers of metal bars on the cell windows. The Italian government stated that the Piacenza cells measured 11 square metres.

In 2010 one of the Piacenza applicants and two other inmates had complained to the supervisory judge of Reggio Emilia. In August 2010 the judge found that the prison, designed for 178 inmates, held between 411 and 415 and ruled that the complainants were exposed to inhuman treatment. He forwarded the complaints to the prison authorities and the Ministry of Justice, and the applicant was moved to a cell for two people in February 2011.

The applications were lodged in 2009 and 2010 and were joined by the Court, which sat as a chamber of the Second Section presided over by Danutė Jočienė.

== Judgment ==
=== Article 3 ===
The Court held unanimously that there had been a violation of Article 3. It found that the lack of space had been made worse by the lack of hot water in both prisons, which the government acknowledged, and by the inadequate light and ventilation at Piacenza, which the government did not dispute. Taken together, these conditions had subjected the applicants to hardship exceeding the level of suffering inherent in detention.

=== Pilot judgment ===
Under Article 46 of the Convention, the Court found that the overcrowding was not the result of isolated incidents but of a systemic problem arising from a chronic dysfunction of the Italian prison system. It noted that several hundred similar applications against Italy were pending and that their number was rising, and decided to apply the pilot-judgment procedure. The Court also found that it had not been shown that the remedy then available, a complaint to the supervisory judge (magistrato di sorveglianza), was effective in practice, that is, able to end the violation and improve the applicants' conditions of detention.

Italy was ordered to introduce, within one year of the judgment becoming final, a remedy or combination of remedies with preventive and compensatory effect for cases of prison overcrowding. In the meantime the Court adjourned for one year the examination of all applications not yet communicated to the government that concerned only overcrowding in Italian prisons. It awarded the applicants between €10,600 and €23,500 each in respect of non-pecuniary damage.

The Italian government asked for the case to be referred to the Grand Chamber. The request was rejected by a panel of the Grand Chamber on 27 May 2013, when the judgment became final, and the one-year deadline therefore ran until May 2014.

== Italian response ==
On 8 October 2013 President Giorgio Napolitano sent a formal message to Parliament on the prison situation. He cited the judgment and the deadline set by the Court, and asked Parliament to consider extraordinary measures including a pardon (indulto) and an amnesty. In a decision filed on 22 November 2013 the Constitutional Court declared inadmissible a question on whether sentences could be postponed when they would be served in inhuman conditions. It referred to Torreggiani and warned that prolonged inaction by the legislature on the problem would not be tolerable.

Decree-law no. 146 of 23 December 2013, later converted into law no. 10 of 2014, introduced a judicial complaint before the supervisory judge for detainees whose rights were seriously infringed. It also established a national ombudsman for the rights of detainees. Decree-law no. 92 of 2014, converted into law no. 117 of 2014, added a compensatory remedy. Detainees held in conditions contrary to Article 3 could obtain a reduction of one day of sentence for every ten days spent in those conditions, and those no longer in prison, or whose remaining sentence did not allow the full reduction, could claim €8 for each such day.

On 16 September 2014, in Stella and Others v. Italy, the Court declared inadmissible a group of applications concerning overcrowding for failure to exhaust the new domestic remedies. By November 2014 the Court had rejected 3,564 such applications, and according to the Court more than 4,200 similar applications were eventually declared inadmissible or struck out of its list.

== Execution and later developments ==
The number of inmates fell from 62,536 at the end of 2013 to 52,164 in 2015. On 8 March 2016 the Committee of Ministers adopted Resolution CM/ResDH(2016)28, closing its supervision of the execution of the judgment. The Council of Europe lists among the measures taken by Italy the new remedies, the creation of an ombudsman and a computerised system for monitoring prison space.

After the closure of the procedure the prison population began to rise again. On 31 August 2026 Italian prisons held 65,661 inmates against an official capacity of 51,220 places. Patrizio Gonnella, president of the prisoners' rights association Antigone, said in September 2026 that overcrowding had reached the levels that had led to Italy's condemnation by the Court in 2010–2013. In 2025 Italian supervisory courts accepted 6,539 complaints under the compensatory remedy introduced in 2014, against about 4,000 applications that had been pending in Strasbourg at the time of the judgment.
