= Optional Protocol to the Convention Against Torture =

2002 treaty supplementing the UN Convention Against Torture

Optional Protocol to the Convention Against Torture and Other Cruel, Inhuman or Degrading Treatment or Punishment
- Ratified or acceded Signed but not ratified Non-parties
- Type: Human rights convention
- Drafted: 18 December 2002
- Signed: 18 December 2002
- Location: New York
- Effective: 22 June 2006
- Condition: 20 ratifications
- Signatories: 76
- Parties: 94
- Depositary: UN Secretary-General
- Languages: Arabic, Chinese, English, French, Russian and Spanish

The Optional Protocol to the Convention Against Torture and Other Cruel, Inhuman or Degrading Treatment or Punishment (commonly known as the Optional Protocol to the Convention Against Torture (OPCAT)) is a treaty that supplements to the 1984 United Nations Convention Against Torture. It establishes an international inspection system for places of detention modeled on the system that has existed in Europe since 1987 (the Committee for the Prevention of Torture).

The OPCAT was adopted by the United Nations General Assembly in New York on 18 December 2002, and it entered into force on 22 June 2006. As of October 2025, the Protocol has 95 parties and 11 additional signatories.

== History ==
The idea for this scheme of torture prevention goes back to the Swiss Committee for the Prevention of Torture (today Association for the Prevention of Torture, APT), founded in 1977 by Jean-Jacques Gautier in Geneva. It envisaged the establishment of a worldwide system of inspection of places of detention, which later took the form of an Optional Protocol to the UN Convention Against Torture and Other Cruel, Inhuman or Degrading Treatment or Punishment (1984). For a long time, however, the necessary support for such an optional protocol was not forthcoming. As a consequence, the UN Committee Against Torture (CAT) had at its disposal only relatively weak instruments: it could analyse and discuss the self-reports of the respective governments and create the institution of a Special Rapporteur on Torture. But neither CAT nor its Special Rapporteur had the power to visit countries, let alone inspect prisons, without the respective government's permission. In 1987, the Council of Europe realized the original idea on a regional level with its European Convention for the Prevention of Torture. On this basis, the European Committee for the Prevention of Torture has demonstrated that regular visits, reports and recommendations to the governments as well as the publication of these reports and the governments' reactions the viability of this model. This in turn led to a breakthrough within the United Nations: OPCAT was created and opened for signatures on 18 December 2002 by the UN General Assembly.

After ratification by 20 states, the Optional Protocol came into force on 22 June 2006.

== Ratification status ==
As of October 2025, 95 states have ratified the protocol: Afghanistan, Albania, Argentina, Armenia, Australia, Austria, Azerbaijan, Bangladesh, Belize, Benin, Bolivia, Bosnia and Herzegovina, Brazil, Bulgaria, Burkina Faso, Burundi, Cabo Verde, Cambodia, Central African Republic, Chile, Costa Rica, Côte d'Ivoire, Congo, Croatia, Cyprus, Czech Republic, Democratic Republic of the Congo, Denmark, Ecuador, Estonia, Finland, France, Gabon, Georgia, Germany, Ghana, Greece, Guatemala, Honduras, Hungary, Iceland, Italy, Kazakhstan, Kyrgyzstan, Latvia, Lebanon, Liberia, Liechtenstein, Lithuania, Luxembourg, Madagascar, Maldives, Mali, Malta, Mauritania, Mauritius, Mexico, Mongolia, Montenegro, Morocco, Mozambique, Nauru, Netherlands, New Zealand, Nicaragua, Niger, Nigeria, North Macedonia, Norway, Panama, Paraguay, Peru, Philippines, Poland, Portugal, Republic of Moldova, Romania, Rwanda, Senegal, Serbia, Slovakia, Slovenia, South Africa, South Sudan, Spain, Sri Lanka, State of Palestine, Sweden, Switzerland, Togo, Tunisia, Türkiye, Ukraine, United Kingdom, and Uruguay.

A further 11 states have signed but not ratified the protocol: Angola, Belgium, Cameroon, Chad, Guinea, Guinea-Bissau, Ireland, Sierra Leone, Timor-Leste, Venezuela, and Zambia.

== See also ==
- Istanbul Protocol
- International Rehabilitation Council for Torture Victims
- Center for Victims of Torture
