= Exclusion of evidence obtained under torture =

Overview of the laws and history of excluding evidence obtained under torture

Statements obtained under torture are not admissible evidence in court proceedings in many jurisdictions.

== International law ==
Article 15 of the 1984 United Nations Convention Against Torture specify that:

Each State Party shall ensure that any statement which is established to have been made as a result of torture shall not be invoked as evidence in any proceedings, except against a person accused of torture as evidence that the statement was made.

A similar provision is also found in Article 10 of the 1985 Inter-American Convention to Prevent and Punish Torture:

No statement that is verified as having been obtained through torture shall be admissible as evidence in a legal proceeding, except in a legal action taken against a person or persons accused of having elicited it through acts of torture, and only as evidence that the accused obtained such statement by such means.

These provisions have the double dissuasive effect of nullifying any utility in using torture with the purpose of eliciting a confession, as well as confirming that should a person extract statements by torture, this can be used against him or her in criminal proceedings. The reason for this is because experience has shown that under torture, or even under a threat of torture, a person will say or do anything solely to avoid the pain. As a result, there is no way to know whether or not the resulting statement is actually correct. If any court relies on any evidence obtained from torture regardless of validity, it provides an incentive for state officials to force a confession, creating a marketplace for torture, both domestically and overseas.

== Within national borders ==
The U.S. and suspected CIA "black sites" Extraordinary renditions allegedly have been carried out from these countries Detainees have allegedly been transported through these countries Detainees have allegedly arrived in these countries Sources: Amnesty International Human Rights Watch

Most states have prohibited their legal systems from accepting evidence that is extracted by torture. The question of the use of evidence obtained under torture has arisen in connection with prosecutions during the war on terror in the United Kingdom and the United States.

=== UK "torture by proxy" ===
The UK's Ambassador to Uzbekistan, Craig Murray, states that he was aware from August 2002 "that the CIA were bringing in detainees to Tashkent from Bagram airport Afghanistan, who were handed over to the Uzbek security services (SNB). I presumed at the time that these were all Uzbek nationals—that may have been a false presumption. I knew that the CIA were obtaining intelligence from their subsequent interrogation by the SNB." He goes on to say that he did not know at the time that any non-Uzbek nationals were flown to Uzbekistan and although he has studied the reports by several journalists and finds their reports credible he is not a firsthand authority on this issue.

In 2003, Murray suggested that it was "wrong to use information gleaned from torture". The unanimous Law Lords judgment on 8 December 2005 confirmed this position. They ruled that, under English law tradition, "torture and its fruits" could not be used in court. But the information thus obtained could be used by the British police and security services as "it would be ludicrous for them to disregard information about a ticking bomb if it had been procured by torture."

Murray's accusations did not lead to any investigation by his employer, the FCO, and he resigned after disciplinary action was taken against him in 2004. The Foreign and Commonwealth Office itself was being investigated by the National Audit Office because of accusations that it has victimized, bullied and intimidated its own staff.

Murray later stated that he felt that he had unwittingly stumbled upon what has been called "torture by proxy". He thought that Western countries moved people to regimes and nations where it was known that information would be extracted by torture, and made available to them.

During a House of Commons debate on 7 July 2009, MP David Davis accused the UK government of outsourcing torture, by allowing Rangzieb Ahmed to leave the country (even though they had evidence against him upon which he was later convicted for terrorism) to Pakistan, where it is said the Inter-Services Intelligence was given the go-ahead by the British intelligence agencies to torture Ahmed. Davis further accused the government of trying to gag Ahmed, stopping him coming forward with his accusations after he had been imprisoned back in the UK. He said, there was "an alleged request to drop his allegations of torture: if he did that, they could get his sentence cut and possibly give him some money. If this request to drop the torture case is true, it is frankly monstrous. It would at the very least be a criminal misuse of the powers and funds under the Government's Contest strategy, and at worst a conspiracy to pervert the course of justice."

=== United States ===
In May 2008, Susan J. Crawford, the official overseeing prosecutions before the Guantanamo military commissions, declined to refer for trial the case of Mohammed al-Qahtani because she said, "we tortured [him]." Crawford said that a combination of techniques with clear medical consequences amounted to the legal definition of torture and that torture "tainted everything going forward."

On 28 October 2008, Guantanamo military judge Stephen R. Henley ruled that the government cannot use statements made as a result of torture in the military commission case against Afghan national Mohammed Jawad. The judge held that Jawad's alleged confession to throwing a grenade at two U.S. service members and an Afghan interpreter was obtained after armed Afghan officials on 17 December 2002, threatened to kill Jawad and his family. The government had previously told the judge that Jawad's alleged confession while in Afghan custody was central to the case against him. Hina Shamsi, staff attorney with the American Civil Liberties Union National Security Project stated: "We welcome the judge's decision that death threats constitute torture and that evidence obtained as a result must be excluded from trial. Unfortunately, evidence obtained through torture and coercion is pervasive in military commission cases that, by design, disregard the most fundamental due process rights, and no single decision can cure that." A month later, on 19 November, the judge again rejected evidence gathered through coercive interrogations in the military commission case against Afghan national Mohammed Jawad, holding that the evidence collected while Jawad was in U.S. custody on 17–18 December 2002, cannot be admitted in his trial, mainly because the U.S. interrogator had blindfolded and hooded Jawad in order to frighten him.

In the 2010 New York trial of Ahmed Khalfan Ghailani who was accused of complicity in the 1998 bombings of U.S. embassies in Tanzania and Kenya, Judge Lewis A. Kaplan ruled evidence obtained under coercion inadmissible. The ruling excluded an important witness, whose name had been extracted from the defendant under duress. The jury acquitted him of 280 charges and convicted on only one charge of conspiracy.

== See also ==
- Fruit of the poisonous tree
