= Standard Minimum Rules for the Treatment of Prisoners =

UN conventions for prisoner rights

The United Nations Standard Minimum Rules for the Treatment of Prisoners were adopted by the United Nations General Assembly on 17 December 2015 after a five-year revision process. They are known as the Mandela Rules in honor of the former South African President, Nelson Mandela. The Mandela Rules are composed of 122 "rules". Not all are rules, but some are principles such as institutional equality and the philosophy of confinement.

== Background ==
The rules were first adopted on 30 August 1955 during a UN Congress on the Prevention of Crime and the Treatment of Offenders, held at Geneva, and approved by the Economic and Social Council in resolutions of 31 July 1957 and 13 May 1977.

Since their adoption by the Economic and Social Council in 1957, the Standard Minimum Rules for the Treatment of Prisoners (SMR) have served as the universally acknowledged minimum standards for the treatment of prisoners. Despite their legally non-binding nature, the rules have been important worldwide as a source for relevant national legislation as well as of practical guidance for prison management.

Although not legally binding, the SMRs provide guidelines for international and domestic law for citizens held in prisons and other forms of custody. The basic principle described in the standard is that "There shall be no discrimination on grounds of race, color, sex, language, religion, political or other opinion, national or social origin, property, birth or other status".

== Scope ==
Part I contains Rules of General Application. It contains standards which set out what is generally accepted as being good practices in the treatment of prisoners and the management of penal institutions. Specifically, it covers issues related to: minimum standards of accommodation (rules 12 to 17); personal hygiene (18); clothing and bedding (19 to 21); food (22); exercise (23); medical services (24 to 35); discipline and punishment (36 to 46); the use of instruments of restraint (47 to 49); complaints (54 to 57); contact with the outside world (58 to 63); the availability of books (64); religion (65 and 66); retention of prisoners' property (67); notification of death, illness, transfer (68 to 70); removal of prisoners (73); the quality and training of prison personnel (74 to 82); and prison inspections (83 to 85).

Part II contains rules applicable to different categories of prisoners including those under sentence. It contains a number of guiding principles (rules 86 to 90); the treatment (rehabilitation) of prisoners (91 and 92); classification and individualization (93 and 94); privileges (95); work (96 to 103); education and recreation (104 and 105); social relations and after-care (106 to 108). Part II also contains rules for prisoners under arrest or awaiting trial (generally referred to as "remand"), rules for civil prisoners (for countries where local law permits imprisonment for debt, or by order of a court for any other non-criminal process) and rules for persons arrested or detained without charge.

== Revision process ==
The General Assembly, in 2010, requested that the Commission on Crime Prevention and Criminal Justice establish an open-ended intergovernmental expert group to exchange information on the revision of the SMRs so that they reflected advances in correctional sciences and best practices, provided that any changes to the rules would not result in lowering existing standards. The General Assembly further highlighted a number of principles which should guide the continued revision process, including that (a) any changes to the SMR should not lower any of the existing standards, but should improve them so that they reflect advances in corrections science and good practices, so as to promote safety, security and humane conditions for prisoners; and that (b) the revision process should maintain the existing scope of application of the SMR for the treatment of prisoners, and continue to take into account the social, legal and cultural differences, as well as human rights obligations, of member states.

== Adoption of the Nelson Mandela Rules ==
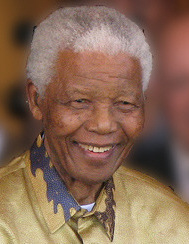
Nelson Mandela, 2008

In December 2015, the General Assembly adopted resolution 70/175 entitled "United Nations Standard Minimum Rules for the Treatment of Prisoners (the Mandela Rules)". The reference was added not only in recognition of South Africa's major support to the revision process, but also to honor Nelson Mandela, who spent 27 years in prisons in the course of his struggle for democracy and the promotion of a culture of peace. Accordingly, the General Assembly also decided to extend the scope of International Nelson Mandela Day (18 July) to be also utilized in order to promote humane prison conditions of imprisonment, to raise awareness about prisoners being a contiguous subset of society, and to value the work of prison staff as a social service of importance.

== See also ==
- Bangkok Rules
- European Prison Rules
- Prisoner's rights
