= European Prison Rules =

The European Prison Rules were drawn up by the Council of Europe. They are intended to provide legally non-binding standards on good principles and practices in the treatment of detainees and the management of detention facilities. They were most recently revised in 2020.

The European Prison Rules were adopted by the Committee of Ministers in 1973 (Resolution 73.5). The Prison Rules were reformulated in 1987 (R 87.3). In January 2006, the Committee of Ministers on the European Prison Rules recommended that the 1987 version needed “to be substantively revised and updated in order to reflect the developments which have occurred in penal policy, sentencing practice and the overall management of prisons in Europe”. Revisions can also be seen to reflect the expansion of Council of Europe membership: 15 member states in 1973, 21 in 1987, and 46 by 2005. A new version of the European Prison Rules was adopted in 2006, replacing all previous versions entirely.

In 2020, the European Prison Rules were revised again. This revision was influenced in part by the development of new, improved standards on prisons at a United Nations level — including through the Nelson Mandela Rules and the United Nations Rules for the Treatment of Women Prisoners and Non-custodial Measures for Women Offenders (the 'Bangkok Rules'). This also reflected compliance with a key provision of the Rules: Rule 108 requires that "The European Prison Rules shall be updated regularly". The revision focused on eight key areas: separation and solitary confinement; women; foreign nationals; instruments of restraint; requests and complaints; adequate prison staffing levels and minimum service guarantees; records and file management; and inspections and monitoring Among the key new provisions was the establishment of a right to at least two hours of meaningful human contact a day for prisoners who are separated from others as a security or safety measure.

The European Prison Rules are based on the United Nations Standard Minimum Rules for the Treatment of Prisoners. They are not legally binding for member states of the Council of Europe, but provide recognised standards on good principles and practices in the treatment of detainees and the management of detention facilities. One observer suggests that ‘almost all European countries aim to apply these standards but it is unlikely that a single one has succeeded in applying them fully.’ In 2006 the Quaker Council for European Affairs produced a gender critique of the European Prison Rules as part of its Women in Prison Project. In recent years the European Prison Rules have been reported to have formed the basis for complaints against penal services and institutions in Norway and Ireland, and have set officially acknowledged standards for prison reform in Armenia. There are 108 rules in nine parts. Part I (rules 1 to 13) sets out basic principles as well as the scope and application. Part II (rules 14 to 38) covers conditions of imprisonment, including: nutrition, hygiene, access to legal advice, education, contact with the outside world, freedom of thought, conscience and religion. Part III deals with health and health care in prisons. Part IV deals with order and security; Part V Management and staff; Part VI Inspection and monitoring; Part VII Untried prisoners; Part VIII Sentenced prisoners; and Part IX the requirements for updating the Rules.
