= European Convention for the Prevention of Torture and Inhuman or Degrading Treatment or Punishment =

Treaty and international human rights law

European Convention for the Prevention of Torture
The European Convention for the Prevention of Torture and Inhuman or Degrading Treatment or Punishment
- Signed: 26 November 1987
- Location: Strasbourg, France
- Effective: 1 February 1989
- Parties: Council of Europe Member States
- Languages: English, French

The European Convention for the Prevention of Torture and Inhuman or Degrading Treatment or Punishment was adopted by the member states of the Council of Europe, meeting at Strasbourg on 26 November 1987. After the European Convention on Human Rights, the Convention for the Prevention of Torture is widely regarded as being one of the most important of the Council of Europe's treaties. The Convention marks a fresh and preventive approach in handling human rights violations. It was subsequently amended by two Protocols. Additionally, the Committee for the Prevention of Torture was established to comply with the provisions of the convention. This body is enabled to visit any place within the jurisdiction of the states' parties where people are deprived of their liberty in line with the articles of the convention.

As of 2020, the convention has been ratified by 46 from 47 of the Council of Europe's member states. Furthermore, the ratification of the convention has become a pre-condition for all states who have joined the Council of Europe in the last few years.

== History ==
=== Objective ===
At the time of its publishing, the convention was groundbreaking, as it was the first instrument capable of enforcing compliance with the obligations it created. Therefore, the objective was to create a document which would ensure adequate consequences are presented to those who do not abide by it. Despite the existence of core publications such as the United Nations Charter or the Universal Declaration of Human Rights, these documents simply could not stop or remedy violations in a rigorous way. The key was thus to prevent torture altogether.

=== Background ===
The origins of the Conventions date to a proposal by Jean-Jacques Gautier in 1976. Gautier was the founder of the Swiss Committee against Torture. He was inspired by the International Committee of the Red Cross (ICRC), who conducted visits to places where prisoners of war were held. He suggested that the conditions of prisoners were improved. However, the ICRC (at the time) had the power to conduct such visits only in case of international armed conflict between states parties to the Geneva Conventions. Gautier thus proposed to extend this system of visits to include all other places where individuals are deprived of their liberty, such as prisons, police stations, psychiatric institutions and remand centres. This proposal then formed the basis of a draft which would eventually become the International Convention against Torture and other Cruel, Inhuman or Degrading Treatment or Punishment. The draft was submitted in April 1980 to be evaluated by the Commission on Human Rights, the body which would come to draft the UN Convention.

Gautier's ideas were then taken by the Council of Europe to be realised, at least at the regional level. Eventually, in June 1983, a report was produced with a draft European Convention on the Protection of Detainees from Torture and from Cruel, Inhuman or Degrading Treatment or Punishment. The report was accepted by the Consultative Assembly in September 1983. Several years of debate followed, including discussions regarding the views of the European Commission and Court of Human Rights. An agreed draft was finally concluded in June 1986, which was transmitted to the Committee of Ministers, who ultimately adopted it on 26 June 1987. It was opened for signature on 26 November 1987. At the time, the convention was signed by all of the 21 member states of the Council of Europe.

As of 2020, it has been signed by 46 from 47 member states of the council. It is also open for accession by non-member States. In September 2025 Russia left the convention.

== Actors ==
This section serves as an overview of the actors which actively contributed to creating the convention.

- Jean-Jacques Gautier, the person who came forward with the original proposal which would eventually lead to the adoption of the Convention
- the Council of Europe
- the Member States of the Council of Europe

== Convention Articles ==
Hereby is a selection of the most significant Articles of the Convention which outline the core values of the document.

=== Article 1 ===
The primary and opening article of the Convention depicts the need for the establishment for a European Committee for the Prevention of Torture and Inhuman or Degrading Treatment or Punishment. For the remainder of the document, it is referred to as "the Committee".

"The Committee shall, by means of visits, examine the treatment of persons deprived of their liberty". If deemed necessary, the committee is to strengthen their protection from torture.

=== Article 2 ===
Article 2 emphasises that each Member State in accordance with the Convention shall permit visits to a place within its jurisdiction where people are deprived of their liberty. This is under the condition that the liberty is taken by a public authority.

"Each Party shall permit visits, in accordance with this Convention, to any place within its jurisdiction where persons are deprived of their liberty by a public authority"

=== Article 8 ===
Article 8 states that if in need of a particular visit, the committee is to notify the Government of the Member State concerned. Only after that can it visit any place as referred to in Article 2.

"The following facilities must be provided to the Committee to carry out the task:"

- "access to its territory and the right to travel without restriction"
- "full information regarding where those deprived of liberty are being held"
- "unlimited access to any place where persons are deprived of their liberty"
  - "this includes the right to move inside such places without restriction"
- "any other relevant information deemed necessary for the Committee to carry out its task"
  - "noting that when seeking this information, the Committee must abide by national laws and professional ethics"
- "the Committee may interview those deprived of liberty in private"
- "the Committee may communicate freely with any person whom it believed to supply relevant information"
- "If necessary, the Committee may immediately communicate observations to the competent authorities of the Party concerned"

=== Article 10 ===
"Each visit should be accompanied by a drawn up report by the Committee regarding the facts found during the visit".

- "This should account for any observations which may have been submitted by the Party concerned. Any recommendations are to be transmitted to the Party. If necessary, the Committee is to suggest improvements in the protection of persons deprived of their liberty"

"If the Party refuses to co-operate or improve the conditions of those deprived of their liberty, the Committee may decide to make a public statement on the matter".

=== Article 11 ===
"The information gathered by the Committee regarding its visits, report and consultations is to remain confidential."

Only at the request of the Party concerned is the Committee allowed to publish the report.

No personal data can be published without the consent of the person concerned.

=== Article 18 ===
The convention is open for signature by all member states of the Council of Europe. It is subject to ratification, acceptance or approval. Instruments of any of these actions are to be deposited with the Secretary General of the Council of Europe.

Non-members states of the Council of Europe may be invited to accede to the convention by the Committee of Ministers of the Council of Europe.

== Convention Protocols ==
=== Protocol No. 1 (ETS No. 151) ===
The first Protocol was adopted 4 November 1993. The Protocol "opens" the convention by providing that the Committee of Ministers of the Council of Europe may invite any non-member State to accede to it. It is now an inherent characteristic to the convention, despite the fact that only member States are signatories as of May 2020.

=== Protocol No. 2 (ETS No. 152) ===
Protocol No. 2 was adopted 4 November 1993 and introduced amendments of a technical nature. The committee is now provisioned to be placed in "one of two groups for election purposes". This is to ensure that at least one half of the committee's members is renewed every two years. The Protocol also allows members of the committee to be re-elected twice, instead of only once.

== Member states participants ==
State	Signature	Ratification	Entry into force
Albania	2 October 1996	2 October 1996	1 February 1997
Andorra	10 September 1996	1 January 1997	5 January 1997
Armenia	11 May 2001	18 June 2002	10 October 2002
Austria	26 November 1987	6 January 1989	1 May 1989
Azerbaijan	21 December 2001	15 April 2002	1 August 2002
Belgium	26 November 1987	23 July 1991	1 November 1991
Bosnia and Herzegovina	12 July 2002	12 July 2002	1 November 2002
Bulgaria	30 September 1993	3 May 1994	1 September 1994
Croatia	6 November 1996	11 October 1997	1 February 1998
Cyprus	26 November 1987	3 April 1989	1 August 1989
Czechia	23 December 1992	7 September 1995	1 January 1996
Denmark	26 November 1987	2 May 1989	1 September 1989
Estonia	28 June 1996	6 November 1996	1 March 1997
Finland	16 November 1989	20 December 1990	1 April 1991
France	26 November 1987	9 January 1989	1 May 1989
Georgia (Note: Georgia states it will "not be responsible for violations of the provisions of the Convention and the safety of the members of the Committee." This applies solely to the territories of Abkhazia and the Tskhinvali region, until the territorial integrity of Georgia is fully restored and control over these territories is carried out by "legitimate authorities.")	16 February 2000	20 June 2000	1 October 2000
Germany	26 November 1987	21 February 1990	1 June 1990
Greece	26 November 1987	2 August 1991	1 December 1991
Hungary	9 February 1993	4 November 1993	1 March 1994
Iceland	26 November 1987	19 June 1990	1 October 1990
Ireland	14 March 1988	14 March 1988	1 February 1989
Italy (Note: Italy declares that paragraph 2(a) of the Annex on Privileges and Immunities is not to be interpreted as "excluding any police or customs check of the luggage of the members of the Committee." This is assuming that the check is carried out whilst complying with the rules on confidentiality as established in Article 11 of the Convention.)	26 November 1987	29 December 1988	1 April 1989
Latvia	11 September 1997	10 February 1998	1 June 1998
Liechtenstein	26 November 1987	12 September 1991	1 January 1992
Lithuania	14 September 1995	26 November 1998	1 March 1999
Luxembourg	26 November 1987	6 September 1988	1 February 1989
Malta	26 November 1987	7 March 1988	1 February 1989
Moldova	5 May 1996	2 October 1997	1 February 1998
Monaco	30 November 2005	30 November 2005	1 March 2006
Montenegro	3 March 2004	3 March 2004	6 June 2006
Netherlands (Note: The Kingdom of the Netherlands accepts said Convention, including with "Annex for the European Netherlands, the Netherlands Antilles and Aruba.")	26 November 1987	12 October 1988	1 February 1989
North Macedonia	14 June 1996	6 June 1997	1 October 1997
Norway	26 November 1987	21 April 1989	1 August 1989
Poland	11 July 1994	10 October 1994	1 February 1995
Portugal	26 November 1987	29 March 1990	1 July 1990
Romania	4 November 1993	4 October 1994	1 February 1995
San Marino	16 November 1989	31 January 1990	1 May 1990
Serbia	3 March 2004	3 March 2004	1 July 2004
Slovakia	23 December 1992	11 May 1994	1 September 1994
Slovenia	4 November 1993	2 February 1994	1 June 1994
Spain	26 November 1987	2 May 1989	1 September 1989
Sweden	26 November 1987	21 June 1988	1 February 1989
Switzerland	26 November 1987	7 October 1988	1 February 1989
Turkey	11 January 1988	26 February 1988	1 February 1989
Ukraine	2 May 1996	5 May 1997	1 September 1997
United Kingdom (Note: Convention is ratified in respect of the United Kingdom of Great Britain and Northern Ireland, the Bailiwick of Jersey and the Isle of Man. On 30 October 2013, the convention was extended to the Sovereign Base Areas of Akrotiri and Dhekelia in Cyprus, which is an Oversea Territory of the United Kingdom.)	26 November 1987	24 June 1988	1 February 1989

=== Former Member states ===
State	Signature	Ratification	Entry into force	Denunciation
Russia	28 February 1996	5 May 1998	1 September 1998	29 September 2025

== Non-member states participants ==
Currently, the list of signatories includes only the member states of the Council of Europe. It is open for signature to non-member states, however none have done so as of the year 2025.

== See also ==
- European Social Charter
- United Nations Optional Protocol to the Convention against Torture and other Cruel, Inhuman or Degrading Treatment or Punishment
- Article 3 of the European Convention on Human Rights
- List of Council of Europe treaties
