= United Nations Convention Against Torture =

International human rights instrument against torture and cruel or unusual punishment

Convention Against Torture and Other Cruel, Inhuman or Degrading Treatment or Punishment
- states parties states that have signed, but not ratified states that have not signed
- Type: Human rights convention
- Drafted: 10 December 1984
- Signed: 4 February 1985
- Location: New York
- Effective: 26 June 1987
- Condition: 20 ratifications
- Signatories: 83
- Parties: 176
- Depositary: UN Secretary-General
- Languages: Arabic, Chinese, English, French, Russian and Spanish

Full text
- Convention against Torture at Wikisource

The Convention Against Torture and Other Cruel, Inhuman or Degrading Treatment or Punishment (commonly known as the United Nations Convention Against Torture (UNCAT)) is an international human rights treaty under the review of the United Nations that aims to prevent torture and other acts of cruel, inhuman, or degrading treatment or punishment around the world.

The Convention requires member states to take effective measures to prevent torture in any territory under their jurisdiction, and forbids member states to transport people to any country where there is reason to believe they will be tortured.

The text of the convention was adopted by the United Nations General Assembly on 10 December 1984 and, following ratification by the 20th state party, it came into force on 26 June 1987. 26 June is now recognized as the International Day in Support of Victims of Torture, in honor of the convention. Since the convention's entry was enforced, the absolute prohibition against torture and other acts of cruel, inhuman, or degrading treatment or punishment has become accepted as a principle of customary international law. As of November 2026, the convention has 176 state parties.

== Summary ==
The Convention follows the structure of the Universal Declaration of Human Rights (UDHR), International Covenant on Civil and Political Rights (ICCPR) and the International Covenant on Economic, Social and Cultural Rights (ICESCR), with a preamble and 33 articles, divided into three parts:

Part I (Articles 1–16) contains a definition of torture (Article 1), and commits parties to taking effective measures to prevent any act of torture in any territory under their jurisdiction (Article 2). These include ensuring that torture is a criminal offense under a party's municipal law (Article 4), establishing jurisdiction over acts of torture committed by or against a party's nationals (Article 5), ensuring that torture is an extraditable offense (Article 8), and establishing universal jurisdiction to bring cases of torture to trial where an alleged torturer cannot be extradited (Article 5). Parties must promptly investigate any allegation of torture (Articles 12 and 13), and victims of torture, or their dependents in case victims died as a result of torture, must have an enforceable right to compensation (Article 14). Parties must also ban the use of evidence produced by torture in their courts (Article 15), and are barred from deporting, extraditing, or refouling people where there are substantial grounds for believing they will be tortured (Article 3). Parties are required to train and educate their public servants and private citizens involved in the custody, interrogation, or treatment of any individual subjected to any form of arrest, detention, or imprisonment, regarding the prohibition against torture (Article 10). Parties also must keep interrogation rules, instructions, methods, and practices under systematic review regarding individuals who are under custody or physical control in any territory under their jurisdiction, in order to prevent all acts of torture (Article 11). Parties are also obliged to prevent all acts of cruel, inhuman, or degrading treatment or punishment in any territory under their jurisdiction, and to investigate any allegation of such treatment. (Article 16).

Part II (Articles 17–24) governs reporting and monitoring of the convention and the steps taken by the parties to implement it. It establishes the Committee Against Torture (Article 17), and empowers it to investigate allegations of systematic torture (Article 20). It also establishes an optional dispute-resolution mechanism between parties (Article 21) and allows parties to recognize the competence of the committee to hear complaints from individuals about violations of the convention by a party (Article 22).

Part III (Articles 25–33) governs ratification, entry into force, and amendment of the convention. It also includes an optional arbitration mechanism for disputes between parties (Article 30).

== Main provisions ==
=== Definition of torture ===
Article 1.1 of the Convention defines torture as:

For the purpose of this Convention, the term "torture" means any act by which severe pain or suffering, whether physical or mental, is intentionally inflicted on a person for such purposes as obtaining from him, or a third person, information or a confession, punishing him for an act he or a third person has committed or is suspected of having committed, or intimidating or coercing him or a third person, or for any reason based on discrimination of any kind, when such pain or suffering is inflicted by or at the instigation of or with the consent or acquiescence of a public official or other person acting in an official capacity. It does not include pain or suffering arising only from, inherent in, or incidental to, lawful sanctions.

The words "inherent in or incidental to lawful sanctions" remain vague and very broad. It is extremely difficult to determine what sanctions are "inherent in or incidental to lawful sanctions" in a particular legal system and what are not. The drafters of the Convention neither provided any criteria for making such determination nor did it define the terms. The nature of the findings would so differ from one legal system to another that they would give rise to serious disputes among the parties to the convention. It was suggested that the reference to such rules would make the issue more complicated, for it would endow the rules with a semblance of legal binding force. This allows state parties to pass domestic laws that permit acts of torture that they believe are within the lawful sanctions clause. However, the most widely adopted interpretation of the lawful sanctions clause is that it refers to sanctions authorized by international law. Pursuant to this interpretation, only sanctions that are authorized by international law will fall within this exclusion. The interpretation of the lawful sanctions clause leaves no scope of application and is widely debated by authors, historians, and scholars alike.

=== Ban on torture ===
Article 2 prohibits torture, and requires parties to take effective measures to prevent it in any territory under their jurisdiction. This prohibition is absolute and non-derogable. "No exceptional circumstances whatsoever" may be invoked to justify torture, including war, threat of war, internal political instability, public emergency, terrorist acts, violent crime, or any form of armed conflict. In other words, torture cannot be justified as a means to protect public safety or prevent emergencies. Subordinates who commit acts of torture cannot abstain themselves from legal responsibility on the grounds that they were just following orders from their superiors.

The prohibition on torture applies to anywhere under a party's effective jurisdiction inside or outside of its borders, whether on board its ships or aircraft or in its military occupations, military bases, peacekeeping operations, health care industries, schools, day care centers, detention centers, embassies, or any other of its areas, and protects all people under its effective control, regardless of nationality or how that control is exercised.

The other articles of part I lay out specific obligations intended to implement this absolute prohibition by preventing, investigating, and punishing acts of torture.

=== Ban on refoulement ===
Article 3 prohibits parties from returning, extraditing, or refouling any person to a state "where there are substantial grounds for believing that he would be in danger of being subjected to torture." The Committee Against Torture has held that this danger must be assessed not just for the initial receiving state, but also to states to which the person may be subsequently expelled, returned or extradited.

=== Obligation to prosecute or extradite ===
Article 7 obligates the government of the state in which the alleged offense occurred to either prosecute the accused party, or extradite them to a state that will, under the principle of aut dedere aut judicare.

=== Ban on cruel, inhuman, or degrading treatment or punishment ===
Article 16 requires parties to prevent "other acts of cruel, inhuman or degrading treatment or punishment which do not amount to torture as defined in article 1" in any territory under their jurisdiction. Because it is often difficult to distinguish between cruel, inhuman, or degrading treatment or punishment and torture, the Committee regards Article 16's prohibition of such act as similarly absolute and non-derogable.

== Signatories and ratifications ==
Participant	Signature	Ratification, accession (a), succession (d)
Afghanistan	4 February 1985	1 April 1987
Albania		11 May 1994 a
Algeria	26 November 1985	12 September 1989
Angola	24 September 2013	2 October 2019
Andorra	5 August 2002	22 September 2006
Antigua and Barbuda		19 July 1993 a
Argentina	4 February 1985	24 September 1986
Armenia		13 September 1993 a
Australia	10 December 1985	8 August 1989
Austria	14 March 1985	29 July 1987
Azerbaijan		16 August 1996 a
Bahamas	16 December 2008	31 May 2018
Bahrain		6 March 1998 a
Bangladesh		5 October 1998 a
Belarus	19 December 1985	13 March 1987 (as the Byelorussian SSR)
Belgium	4 February 1985	25 June 1999
Belize		17 March 1986 a
Benin		12 March 1992 a
Bolivia	4 February 1985	12 April 1999
Bosnia and Herzegovina		1 September 1993 d
Botswana	8 September 2000	8 September 2000
Brazil	23 September 1985	28 September 1989
Brunei	22 September 2015	
Bulgaria	10 June 1986	16 December 1986
Burkina Faso		4 January 1999 a
Burundi		18 February 1993 a
Cambodia		15 October 1992 a
Cameroon		19 December 1986 a
Canada	23 August 1985	24 June 1987
Cape Verde		4 June 1992 a
Central African Republic		11 October 2016 a
Chad		9 June 1995 a
Chile	23 September 1987	30 September 1988
China	12 December 1986	4 October 1988
Colombia	10 April 1985	8 December 1987
Comoros	22 September 2000	25 May 2017
Republic of the Congo		30 July 2003 a
Costa Rica	4 February 1985	11 November 1993
Croatia		12 October 1992 d
Cuba	27 January 1986	17 May 1995
Cyprus	9 October 1985	18 July 1991
Czech Republic		22 February 1993 d (previously ratified by Czechoslovakia on 7 July 1988)
Democratic Republic of the Congo		18 March 1996 a (as Zaire)
Denmark	4 February 1985	27 May 1987
Djibouti		5 November 2002 a
Dominica		5 December 2024 a
Dominican Republic	4 February 1985	24 January 2012
Ecuador	4 February 1985	30 March 1988
Egypt		25 June 1986 a
El Salvador		17 June 1996 a
Equatorial Guinea		8 October 2002 a
Eritrea		25 September 2014 a
Estonia		21 October 1991 a
Eswatini		26 March 2004 a
Ethiopia		14 March 1994 a
Fiji	1 March 2016	16 March 2016
Finland	4 February 1985	30 August 1989
France	4 February 1985	18 February 1986
Gabon	21 January 1986	8 September 2000
Gambia	23 October 1985	28 September 2018
Georgia		26 October 1994 a
Germany	13 October 1986	1 October 1990 (Signed as West Germany. East Germany also ratified on 9 September 1987)
Ghana	7 September 2000	7 September 2000
Greece	4 February 1985	6 October 1988
Grenada		26 September 2019 a
Guatemala		5 January 1990 a
Guinea	30 May 1986	10 October 1989
Guinea-Bissau	12 September 2000	24 September 2013
Guyana	25 January 1988	19 May 1988
Holy See		26 June 2002 a
Honduras		5 December 1996 a
Hungary	28 November 1986	15 April 1987
Iceland	4 February 1985	23 October 1996
India	14 October 1997	
Indonesia	23 October 1985	28 October 1998
Iraq		7 July 2011 a
Ireland	28 September 1992	11 April 2002
Israel	22 October 1986	3 October 1991
Italy	4 February 1985	12 January 1989, 5 July 2017 a
Ivory Coast		18 December 1995 a
Japan		29 June 1999 a
Jordan		13 November 1991 a
Kazakhstan		26 August 1998 a
Kenya		21 February 1997 a
Kiribati		22 July 2019 a
Kuwait		8 March 1996 a
Kyrgyzstan		5 September 1997 a
Laos	21 September 2010	26 September 2012
Latvia		14 April 1992 a
Lebanon		5 October 2000 a
Lesotho		12 November 2001 a
Liberia		22 September 2004 a
Libya		16 May 1989 a (then Libyan Arab Jamahiriya Libyan Arab Jamahiriya)
Liechtenstein	27 June 1985	2 November 1990
Lithuania		1 February 1996 a
Luxembourg	22 February 1985	29 September 1987
Madagascar	1 October 2001	13 December 2005
Malawi		11 June 1996 a
Maldives		20 April 2004 a
Mali		26 February 1999 a
Malta		13 September 1990 a
Marshall Islands		12 March 2018 a
Mauritania		17 November 2004 a
Mauritius		9 December 1992 a
Mexico	18 March 1985	23 January 1986
Moldova		28 November 1995 a
Monaco		6 December 1991 a
Mongolia		24 January 2002 a
Montenegro		23 October 2006 d
Morocco	8 January 1986	21 June 1993
Mozambique		14 September 1999 a
Namibia		28 November 1994 a
Nauru	12 November 2001	26 September 2012
Nepal		14 May 1991 a
Netherlands	4 February 1985	21 December 1988
New Zealand	14 January 1986	10 December 1989
Nicaragua	15 April 1985	5 July 2005
Niger		5 October 1998 a
Nigeria	28 July 1988	28 June 2001
North Macedonia		12 December 1994 d
Norway	4 February 1985	9 July 1986
Pakistan	17 April 2008	3 June 2010
Palau	20 September 2011	
Palestine		2 April 2014 a
Oman		9 June 2020 a
Panama	22 February 1985	24 August 1987
Paraguay	23 October 1989	12 March 1990
Peru	29 May 1985	7 July 1988
Philippines		18 June 1986 a
Poland	13 January 1986	26 July 1989
Portugal	4 February 1985	9 February 1989
Qatar		11 January 2000 a
Romania		18 December 1990 a
Russia	10 December 1985	3 March 1987 (ratified as the Soviet Union)
Rwanda		15 December 2008 a
Saint Kitts and Nevis		21 September 2020 a
Saint Lucia		12 February 2026 a
Saint Vincent and the Grenadines		1 August 2001 a
Samoa		28 March 2019 a
San Marino	18 September 2002	27 November 2006
São Tomé and Príncipe	6 September 2000	10 January 2017
Saudi Arabia		23 September 1997 a
Senegal	4 February 1985	21 August 1986
Serbia		12 March 2001 d (ratified as the Federal Republic of Yugoslavia; SFR Yugoslavia had previously ratified on 10 September 1991)
Seychelles		5 May 1992 a
Sierra Leone	18 March 1985	25 April 2001
Slovakia		28 May 1993 d (previously ratified by Czechoslovakia on 7 July 1988)
Slovenia		16 July 1993 a
Somalia		24 January 1990 a
South Africa	29 January 1993	10 December 1998
South Korea		9 January 1995 a
South Sudan		30 April 2015 a
Spain	4 February 1985	21 October 1987
Sri Lanka		3 January 1994 a
Sudan	4 June 1986	10 August 2021
Suriname		16 November 2021 a
Sweden	4 February 1985	8 January 1986
Switzerland	4 February 1985	2 December 1986
Syria		19 August 2004 a
Tajikistan		11 January 1995 a
Thailand		2 October 2007 a
Timor-Leste		16 April 2003 a
Togo	25 March 1987	18 November 1987
Tunisia	26 August 1987	23 September 1988
Turkey	25 January 1988	2 August 1988
Turkmenistan		25 June 1999 a
Tuvalu		25 March 2024 a
Uganda		3 November 1986 a
Ukraine	27 February 1986	24 February 1987 (ratified as the Ukrainian SSR)
United Arab Emirates		19 July 2012 a
United Kingdom	15 March 1985	8 December 1988 (British Indian Ocean Territory not included)
United States	18 April 1988	21 October 1994 (With specific reservations detailed here.)
Uruguay	4 February 1985	24 October 1986
Uzbekistan		28 September 1995 a
Vanuatu		12 July 2011 a
Venezuela	15 February 1985	29 July 1991
Vietnam	7 November 2013	5 February 2015
Yemen		5 November 1991 a
Zambia		7 October 1998 a

As of November 2026, there are 176 States parties. 19 UN Member States are not yet party to the convention.

== Optional Protocol ==
states parties states that signed, but have not ratified states that have not signed

The Optional Protocol to the Convention Against Torture and Other Cruel, Inhuman or Degrading Treatment or Punishment (OPCAT), adopted by the General Assembly on 18 December 2002 and in force since 22 June 2006, provides for the establishment of "a system of regular visits undertaken by independent international and national bodies to places where people are deprived of their liberty, in order to prevent torture and other cruel, inhuman or degrading treatment or punishment", to be overseen by a Subcommittee on Prevention of Torture and Other Cruel, Inhuman or Degrading Treatment or Punishment.

As of April 2022, the Protocol has 76 signatories and 91 parties.

== Committee Against Torture ==
The Committee Against Torture (CAT) is a body of human rights experts that monitors implementation of the convention by State parties. The committee is one of eight UN-linked human rights treaty bodies. All state parties are obliged under the convention to submit regular reports to the CAT on how rights are being implemented. Upon ratifying the convention, states must submit a report within one year, after which they are obliged to report every four years. The Committee examines each report and addresses its concerns and recommendations to the State party in the form of "concluding observations". Under certain circumstances, the CAT may consider complaints or communications from individuals claiming that their rights under the Convention have been violated.

== Effects ==
A 2021 study in the American Journal of Political Science found that countries that adopt national laws that prohibit torture (defining it in line with the standards codified in the UN Convention against Torture) subsequently experience reductions in police torture.

== See also ==
- Psychological torture
- European Convention for the Prevention of Torture and Inhuman or Degrading Treatment or Punishment
- International Day in Support of Victims of Torture
- International Rehabilitation Council for Torture Victims
- Use of torture since 1948
- World Organization Against Torture
