= The Middle Way (book) =

1938 book by Harold Macmillan

- Author: Harold Macmillan
- Subject: Politics, Economics, International relations, British studies
- Publisher: Random House
- Publication date: 1938

The Middle Way: A Study of the Problems of Economic and Social Progress in a Free and Democratic Society is a 1938 book on political philosophy written by Harold Macmillan, a British Conservative Party politician and later prime minister of the United Kingdom. It was originally published in 1938 (by Macmillan & Co, Ltd, London). It advocated a broadly centrist approach to the domestic and international problems of that time, and was written when Macmillan was Member of Parliament for Stockton-on-Tees but before he entered the Cabinet. He called for a programme of nationalisation at least as ambitious as then advocated by the Labour Party.

== Content ==
It is subtitled 'A Study of the Problems of Economic and Social Progress in a Free and Democratic Society' and is divided into 3 main sections

- Part 1 The Needs

Ch I The Emergence of a New Doctrine
Ch II Life and Liberty
Ch III The End of Radical Reformism
Ch IV Minimum Needs and Present Incomes
Ch V Present Methods of Distribution
Ch VI What Has to be Done

- Part 2 The Methods

Ch VII Past Theories and Present Needs
Ch VIII Public Enterprise & Private Combination
Ch IX The Aims of Economic Policy in the Future
Ch X Industrial Reconstruction
Ch XI Finance
Ch XII Foreign Trade
Ch XIII Co-ordination

- Part 3 The Benefits

Ch XIV The Minimum Wage
Ch XV A Minimum for the Unemployed
Ch XVI Public Utility Distribution
Ch XVII Economic Security
Ch XVII Freedom & Progress

== See also ==
- Third Way
