= Supermac (cartoon) =

1958 cartoon image of British Prime Minister Harold Macmillan

"Super-Mac" was a 1958 cartoon image of Harold Macmillan, which became an enduring nickname for him.

With its rather dismissive caption, "How to Try to Continue to be Top Without Actually Having Been There", the cartoon image, by "Vicky" (Victor Weisz) first appeared in the Evening Standard on 6 November 1958. It depicted a caricature of Harold Macmillan, the British Prime Minister at the time, in the guise of the comic-book hero Superman.

== Image ==
The cartoon was signed "Vicky – with apologies to Stephen Potter", an acknowledgement of the full title of Potter's book of 1958, Supermanship, or, How to Continue to Stay Top without Actually Falling Apart. The figure quickly became a staple of Vicky's output, and "Supermac" (mostly spelt without a hyphen) was widely and enduringly applied as a nickname for Macmillan. Though initially an ironic coinage, it soon rebounded to Macmillan's advantage, becoming an integral part of his image. D. R. Thorpe's biography of Macmillan (2010) was entitled Supermac: The Life of Harold Macmillan.

In a subsequent cartoon, a cinema named the "Torytz" (after "Tory") was portrayed with posters proclaiming "Supermac - He's terrific - He's stupendous ... A super-colossal-top-production in true-blue colour". The Conservative Party Chairman, Quintin Hogg, Viscount Hailsham, was dressed as a commissionaire presiding over a "house full", while astonished members of the public, queuing for seats at the outrageous price of 12 shillings and sixpence, marvelled at the image of Supermac.

== Heyday: late 1950s ==
The creation of Supermac reflected an age in which, following the austerity of the post-Second World War period and the disaster of the Suez Crisis of 1956, Britain was enjoying increasing prosperity and a general upturn in the national mood. This feeling was widely regarded as having been typified by Macmillan's assertion in July 1957 that "most of our people have never had it so good" (often cited as "you've never had it so good"), though some, particularly in retrospect, saw it as a complacent and materialistic observation, maybe unaware that Macmillan had added the warning that "what is beginning to worry some of us is ... 'Is it too good to last?'".

=== Unflappability ===
Other examples of Macmillan's apparent air of confidence and "unflappability" (a characteristic frequently attributed to him during this period, despite his apparent nervousness on big Parliamentary occasions) included his reference in 1958 to the resignation of Chancellor of the Exchequer Peter Thorneycroft and two other Treasury Ministers, Nigel Birch and Enoch Powell, as "little local difficulties", and his mocking promise during the 1959 general election campaign - "I challenge Mr Gaitskell [Labour opposition leader] to meet this one" - that it would rain on polling day. (It did not, in fact, rain on 9 October, but Macmillan won the election with a majority in the House of Commons of 100 seats.)

== Changing image of the 1960s ==
The final years of Macmillan's premiership were difficult ones, coinciding with the satire boom of the early 1960s, in which the revue Beyond the Fringe, the magazine Private Eye and the BBC television series That Was the Week That Was all tended to portray Macmillan as an aristocratic and rather doddery figure of fun (journalist Bernard Levin dubbed him "the walrus" after the character in Alice in Wonderland. The "Supermac" image tended to be replaced in the public mind by that of the grouse-moor: in other words, the sense of many that both Macmillan and the Conservative Party, which had been in power since 1951, were out of touch. As Anthony Sampson put it, "Macmillan in 1959 seemed to fit in with the mood of the country; Macmillan in 1962 seemed left behind by the tide. The slogan Supermac ... [was] now totally inapposite". Similarly, although Macmillan told journalist Jocelyn Stevens in 1963 that he had three shooting suits and "rather like[d] them", the "grouse-moor" image which had, only a few years earlier, been seen as "enhancing the backdrop of the Prime Minister's unflappability", now seemed something of a liability.

=== "We've never had it so often" ===
In 1963, after the Government had withstood the Profumo affair, with its succession of allegations relating mostly to sex, Macmillan resigned on grounds of ill health. Arguably the best remembered cartoon of that year (which the poet Philip Larkin famously identified as the one in which "sexual intercourse began") was Trog's in Private Eye showing Macmillan walking away with a ladder and a tin of paint from a wall on which had been emblazoned the words, "We've Never Had It So Often".

The appointment of the 14th Earl of Home as Macmillan's successor served to perpetuate the "grouse moor" image, although Home responded to jibes about his background by referring to Labour Opposition leader Harold Wilson as "the fourteenth Mr Wilson". In the event, Sir Alec Douglas-Home, as he became after disclaiming his peerage, lost the 1964 general election by a very small margin.

== Renaissance of the 1980s: "Earl Supermac" ==
Macmillan lived for another 23 years. The "Supermac" image was more fondly recalled in the years immediately before his death in 1986 as, having accepted an earldom on his 90th birthday in 1984 ("Earl Supermac!" according to a headline in the Daily Mail), he enjoyed something of a public renaissance as a member of the newly televised House of Lords. Macmillan's biographer noted that "the media which had so misprized and lampooned him back in the 1960s ... now positively slobbered over him".
