= Harold Macmillan =

Prime Minister of the United Kingdom from 1957 to 1963

The Right Honourable The Earl of Stockton OM PC FRS
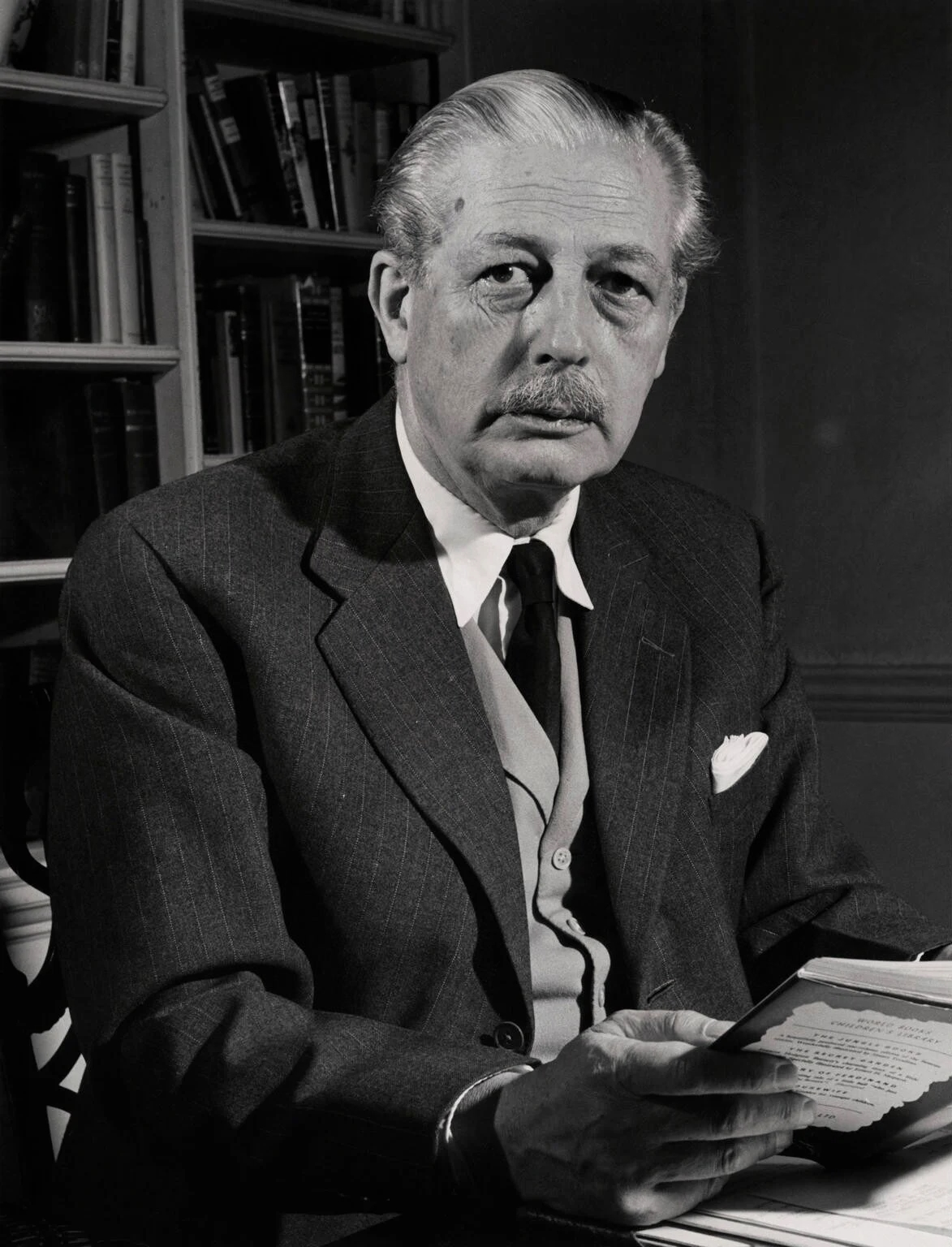
- Official portrait, 1959

Prime Minister of the United Kingdom
- In office 10 January 1957 – 18 October 1963
- Monarch: Elizabeth II
- First Secretary: Rab Butler (1962–1963)
- Preceded by: Anthony Eden
- Succeeded by: Alec Douglas-Home

Leader of the Conservative Party
- In office 10 January 1957 – 18 October 1963
- Preceded by: Anthony Eden
- Succeeded by: Alec Douglas-Home
Ministerial offices
Chancellor of the Exchequer
In office 20 December 1955 – 13 January 1957
Prime Minister	Anthony Eden
Preceded by	Rab Butler
Succeeded by	Peter Thorneycroft
Secretary of State for Foreign Affairs
In office 7 April 1955 – 20 December 1955
Prime Minister	Anthony Eden
Preceded by	Anthony Eden
Succeeded by	Selwyn Lloyd
Minister of Defence
In office 19 October 1954 – 7 April 1955
Prime Minister	Winston Churchill
Preceded by	The Earl Alexander of Tunis
Succeeded by	Selwyn Lloyd
Minister of Housing and Local Government
In office 30 October 1951 – 19 October 1954
Prime Minister	Winston Churchill
Preceded by	Hugh Dalton
Succeeded by	Duncan Sandys
Secretary of State for Air
In office 25 May 1945 – 26 July 1945
Prime Minister	Winston Churchill
Preceded by	Archibald Sinclair
Succeeded by	The Viscount Stansgate
Minister Resident in Northwest Africa
In office 30 December 1942 – 25 May 1945
Prime Minister	Winston Churchill
Preceded by	Office established
Succeeded by	Harold Balfour
Parliamentary Under-Secretary of State for the Colonies
In office 4 February 1942 – 30 December 1942
Prime Minister	Winston Churchill
Preceded by	George Hall
Succeeded by	The Duke of Devonshire
Parliamentary Secretary to the Ministry of Supply
In office 15 May 1940 – 4 February 1942
Prime Minister	Winston Churchill
Preceded by	John Llewellin
Succeeded by	The Viscount Portal
Parliamentary offices
Member of the House of Lords
Lord Temporal
Hereditary peerage 24 February 1984 – 29 December 1986
Preceded by	Peerage created
Succeeded by	The 2nd Earl of Stockton
Member of Parliament
In office 14 November 1945 – 25 September 1964
Preceded by	Edward Campbell
Succeeded by	John Hunt
Constituency	Bromley
In office 27 October 1931 – 15 June 1945
Preceded by	Frederick Fox Riley
Succeeded by	George Chetwynd
Constituency	Stockton-on-Tees
In office 29 October 1924 – 10 May 1929
Preceded by	Robert Strother Stewart
Succeeded by	Frederick Fox Riley
Constituency	Stockton-on-Tees
Academic offices
Chancellor of the University of Oxford
In office 3 March 1960 – 18 December 1986
Preceded by	Edward Wood
Succeeded by	Roy Jenkins

Personal details
- Born: Maurice Harold Macmillan; 10 February 1894 London, England
- Died: 29 December 1986 (aged 92) Horsted Keynes, West Sussex, England
- Resting place: St Giles' Church, Horsted Keynes, West Sussex, England
- Party: Conservative
- Spouse: Lady Dorothy Cavendish (m. 1920; died 1966)
- Children: 4, including Maurice and Caroline
- Education: Balliol College, Oxford
- Occupation: Publisher; politician
- Civilian awards: Order of Merit (1976); Peerage (1984)

Military service
- Branch/service: British Army
- Years of service: 1914–1920
- Rank: Captain
- Unit: Grenadier Guards
- Battles/wars: First World War; Battle of Loos; Battle of the Somme
- Military awards: 1914–15 Star; British War Medal; Victory Medal

Maurice Harold Macmillan, 1st Earl of Stockton (10 February 1894 – 29 December 1986) was Prime Minister of the United Kingdom and Leader of the Conservative Party from 1957 to 1963. Nicknamed "Supermac", he was known for his pragmatism, wit, and unflappability.

Educated at Eton and Oxford, Macmillan was seriously injured as a captain of the Grenadier Guards during the First World War and suffered pain and partial immobility for the rest of his life. After the war he joined his family's book-publishing business, then entered the Commons at the 1924 general election representing Stockton-on-Tees. Losing his seat in 1929, he regained it in 1931 as a supporter of economic planning. He opposed the appeasement of Nazi Germany practised by the government and entered the Cabinet soon after the Second World War broke out as a protégé of Prime Minister Winston Churchill.

In the 1950s Macmillan served as Foreign Secretary and Chancellor of the Exchequer under Anthony Eden. When Eden resigned in 1957 following the Suez Crisis, Macmillan succeeded him as prime minister and party leader. He was a One Nation Tory of the Disraelian tradition and supported the post-war consensus of the welfare state and the mixed economy, with some nationalised industries and strong trade unions. He championed a Keynesian strategy of deficit spending to maintain demand and pursued corporatist policies to develop the domestic market as the engine of growth. Amid favourable international conditions, he presided over an age of affluence, marked by low unemployment and high—if uneven—growth, as well as modest social reforms. In July 1957, Macmillan told the nation it had "never had it so good", but warned of the dangers of inflation, summing up the decade's fragile prosperity. He led the Conservatives to success in 1959 with an increased majority.

Citing the "wind of change blowing across the continent", Macmillan presided over much of the decolonisation of Africa, beginning with the Gold Coast (Ghana) in 1957. He worked to rebuild the Special Relationship with the United States after the Suez débâcle, of which he had been one of the architects. However, after the Skybolt Crisis, he sought a more active role for Britain in Europe, including by joining the European Economic Community (EEC). Reconfiguring the nation's defences amid the Cold War, Macmillan ended National Service, strengthened the nuclear forces by acquiring Polaris, and pioneered the Nuclear Test Ban with the United States and the Soviet Union. His unwillingness to disclose US nuclear secrets to France contributed to the independent French acquisition of atomic weapons in 1960 and the French veto of the United Kingdom's application for EEC membership in 1963.

Beginning in the 1960s, Macmillan's government was rocked by the Vassall Tribunal and the Profumo affair, which to cultural conservatives and supporters of opposing parties alike seemed to symbolise the moral decay of the British establishment. Amid declining Conservative Party popularity, Macmillan fumbled a controversial Cabinet reshuffle on 12–13 July 1962—the "Night of the Long Knives"—earning the sobriquet "Mac the Knife". The following year, Macmillan resigned his seat in Parliament and the premiership, citing ill health. He was succeeded in October 1963 by Foreign Secretary Lord Home, who was defeated by Labour in the 1964 election. After his resignation, Macmillan lived out a long retirement, becoming a member of the House of Lords in 1984 before dying in December 1986 aged 92.

== Early life ==
=== Family ===
Maurice Harold Macmillan was born on 10 February 1894 at 52 Cadogan Place in Belgravia, London, to Maurice Crawford Macmillan, a publisher, and the former Helen (Nellie) Artie Tarleton Belles, an artist and socialite from Spencer, Indiana. He had two brothers, Daniel, eight years his senior, and Arthur, four years his senior. His paternal grandfather, Daniel MacMillan, who founded Macmillan Publishers, was the son of a Scottish crofter from the Isle of Arran. Macmillan considered himself a Scot.

=== Education and early political views ===
Macmillan received an intensive early education, closely guided by his American mother. He learned French at home every morning from a succession of nursery maids, and exercised daily at Mr Macpherson's Gymnasium and Dancing Academy, around the corner from the family home. From the age of six or seven he received introductory lessons in classical Latin and Greek at Mr Gladstone's day school, close by in Sloane Square.

Macmillan attended Summer Fields School, Oxford (1903–1906). He was Third Scholar at Eton College, but his time there (1906–1910) was blighted by recurrent illness, starting with a near-fatal attack of pneumonia in his first half (term); he missed his final year after being taken ill, and was taught at home by private tutors (1910–1911), notably Ronald Knox, who did much to instil his High Church Anglicanism. He won an exhibition (scholarship) to Balliol College, Oxford.

In his youth, he was an admirer of the policies and leadership of a succession of Liberal prime ministers, starting with Henry Campbell-Bannerman, who came to power when Macmillan was 11 years old and H. H. Asquith, whom he later described as having "intellectual sincerity and moral nobility", and particularly of Asquith's successor, David Lloyd George, whom he regarded as a "man of action", likely to accomplish his goals.

Macmillan went up to Balliol College in 1912, where he joined many political societies. His political opinions at this stage were an eclectic mix of moderate conservatism, moderate liberalism and Fabian socialism. He read avidly about Benjamin Disraeli, but was also particularly impressed by a speech by Lloyd George at the Oxford Union Society in 1913, where he had become a member. Macmillan was a protégé of the president of the Union Society Walter Monckton, later a Cabinet colleague; as such, he became secretary then junior treasurer (elected unopposed in March 1914, then an unusual occurrence) of the Union, and would in his biographers' view "almost certainly" have been president had the war not intervened. He obtained a First in Honour Moderations, informally known as 'Mods' (consisting of Latin and Greek, the first half of the four-year Oxford Literae Humaniores course, informally known as "Greats"), in 1914. With his final exams over two years away, he enjoyed an idyllic Trinity term at Oxford, just before the outbreak of the First World War.

=== War service ===
Volunteering as soon as war was declared, Macmillan was commissioned as a temporary second lieutenant in the King's Royal Rifle Corps on 19 November 1914. Promoted to lieutenant on 30 January 1915, he soon transferred to the Grenadier Guards. He fought on the front lines in France, where the casualty rate was high, including the probability of an "early violent death". He served with distinction and was wounded on three occasions. Shot in the right hand and receiving a glancing bullet wound to the head in the Battle of Loos in September 1915, Macmillan was sent to Lennox Gardens in Chelsea for hospital treatment, then joined a reserve battalion at Chelsea Barracks from January to March 1916, until his hand had healed. He then returned to the front lines in France. Leading an advance platoon in the Battle of Flers–Courcelette (part of the Battle of the Somme) in September 1916, he was severely wounded, and lay for over twelve hours in a shell hole, sometimes feigning death when Germans passed, and reading Aeschylus in the original Greek. Raymond Asquith, eldest son of the prime minister, was a brother officer in Macmillan's regiment and was killed that month.

Macmillan spent the final two years of the war in King Edward VII's Hospital in Grosvenor Gardens undergoing a series of operations. He was still on crutches at the Armistice of 11 November 1918. His hip wound took four years to heal completely, and he was left with a slight shuffle to his walk and a limp grip in his right hand from his previous wound, which affected his handwriting.

Macmillan saw himself as both a "gownsman" and a "swordsman" and would later display open contempt for other politicians (e.g. Rab Butler, Hugh Gaitskell, Harold Wilson) who had not seen military service in either World War.

=== Canadian aide-de-campship ===
Of the scholars and exhibitioners of his year, only he and one other survived the war. As a result, he refused to return to Oxford to complete his degree, saying the university would never be the same; in later years he joked that he had been "sent down by the Kaiser".

Owing to the impending contraction of the Army after the war, a regular commission in the Grenadiers was out of the question. However, at the end of 1918 Macmillan joined the Guards Reserve Battalion at Chelsea Barracks for "light duties". On one occasion he had to command reliable troops in a nearby park as a unit of Guardsmen was briefly refusing to reembark for France, although the incident was resolved peacefully. The incident prompted an inquiry from the War Office as to whether the Guards Reserve Battalion "could be relied on".

Macmillan then served in Ottawa, Canada, in 1919 as aide-de-camp (ADC) to Victor Cavendish, 9th Duke of Devonshire, then Governor General of Canada, and his future father-in-law. The engagement of Captain Macmillan to the Duke's daughter Lady Dorothy was announced on 7 January 1920. He relinquished his commission on 1 April 1920. As was common for contemporary former officers, he continued to be known as 'Captain Macmillan' until the early 1930s and was listed as such in every general election between 1923 and 1931. As late as his North African posting of 1942–43 he reminded Churchill that he held the rank of captain in the Guards reserve.

=== Macmillan Publishers ===
On his return to London in 1920 he joined the family publishing firm Macmillan Publishers as a junior partner. In 1936, Harold and his brother Daniel took control of the firm, with the former focusing on the political and non-fiction side of the business. Harold resigned from the company on appointment to ministerial office in 1940. He resumed working with the firm from 1945 to 1951 when the party was in opposition.

== Personal life ==
According to Michael Bloch, there have long been rumours that Macmillan was expelled from Eton for homosexuality. Macmillan's biographer D. R. Thorpe is of the view that he was removed by his mother when she discovered that he was being "used" by older boys. Dick Leonard reports that Alistair Horne refers to "inevitable rumours" and that "he left for the 'usual reasons' for boys to be expelled from public schools".

=== Marriage ===
Macmillan married Lady Dorothy Cavendish, the daughter of the 9th Duke of Devonshire, on 21 April 1920. Her great-uncle was Spencer Cavendish, 8th Duke of Devonshire, who was leader of the Liberal Party in the 1870s, and a close colleague of William Ewart Gladstone, Joseph Chamberlain and Lord Salisbury. Lady Dorothy was also descended from William Cavendish, 4th Duke of Devonshire, who served as prime minister from 1756 to 1757 in communion with Newcastle and Pitt the Elder. Her nephew William Cavendish, Marquess of Hartington, married Kathleen Kennedy, a sister of John F. Kennedy.

In 1929, Lady Dorothy began a lifelong affair with the Conservative politician Robert Boothby, an arrangement that scandalised high society but remained unknown to the general public. Philip Frere, a partner in Frere Cholmely solicitors, urged Macmillan not to divorce his wife, which at that time would have been fatal to a public career even for the "innocent party". Macmillan and Lady Dorothy lived largely separate lives in private thereafter. The stress caused by that may have contributed to Macmillan's nervous breakdown in 1931. He was often treated with condescension by his aristocratic in-laws and was observed to be a sad and isolated figure at Chatsworth in the 1930s. John Campbell suggests that Macmillan's humiliation was first a major cause of his odd and rebellious behaviour in the 1930s then, in subsequent decades, made him a harder and more ruthless politician than his rivals Eden and Butler.

The Macmillans had four children:

- Maurice Macmillan, Viscount Macmillan of Ovenden (1921–1984), Conservative politician and publisher. Married the Hon. Katharine Ormsby-Gore, daughter of the 4th Baron Harlech. His father outlived him by nearly three years.
- Lady Caroline Macmillan (1923–2016). Married Julian Faber; five children.
- Lady Catherine Macmillan (1926–1991). Married Julian Amery (later Baron Amery of Lustleigh), Conservative politician; four children.
- Sarah Macmillan (1930–1970). A family rumour that Boothby was her natural father has been discounted by the most recent and detailed study. Married Andrew Heath in 1953; two children. Having had an abortion in 1951, she was unable to have children of her own and the couple adopted two sons. She had an unhappy life, which was blighted by a drinking problem, and died aged only 40, her father outliving her by 16 years.

Lady Dorothy died on 21 May 1966, aged 65.

In old age, Macmillan was a close friend of Ava Anderson, Viscountess Waverley, née Bodley, the widow of John Anderson, 1st Viscount Waverley. Eileen O'Casey, née Reynolds, the actress wife of Irish dramatist Seán O'Casey, was another female friend, Macmillan publishing her husband's plays. Although she is said to have replaced Lady Dorothy in Macmillan's affections, there is disagreement over how intimate they became after the deaths of their respective spouses, and whether he proposed.

== Political career, 1924–1951 ==
=== Member of Parliament (1924–1929) ===
Macmillan contested the depressed northern industrial constituency of Stockton-on-Tees in 1923. The campaign cost him about £200–£300 out of his own pocket; at that time candidates were often expected to fund their own election campaigns. The collapse in the Liberal vote let him win in 1924. In 1927, four MPs, including Boothby and Macmillan, published a short book advocating radical measures. In 1928, Macmillan was described by his political hero, and now Parliamentary colleague, David Lloyd George, as a "born rebel".

Macmillan lost his seat in 1929 in the face of high regional unemployment. He almost became Conservative candidate for the safe seat of Hitchin in 1931. However the sitting MP, Guy Kindersley cancelled his retirement plans, in part because of his own association with the anti-Baldwin rebels and his suspicion of Macmillan's sympathy for Oswald Mosley's promises of radical measures to reduce unemployment. Instead, the resignation of the new candidate at Stockton allowed Macmillan to be re-selected there, and he returned to the House of Commons for his old seat in 1931.

=== Member of Parliament (1931–1939) ===
Macmillan spent the 1930s on the backbenches. In March 1932 he published "The State and Industry" (not to be confused with his earlier pamphlet "Industry and the State"). In September 1932 he made his first visit to the Soviet Union. Macmillan also published "The Next Step". He advocated cheap money and state direction of investment. In 1933 he was the sole author of "Reconstruction: A Plea for a National Unity". In 1935 he was one of 15 MPs to write "Planning for Employment". His next publication, "The Next Five Years", was overshadowed by Lloyd George's proposed "New Deal" in 1935. Macmillan Press also published the work of the economist John Maynard Keynes.

Macmillan resigned the government whip (but not the Conservative party one) in protest at the lifting of sanctions on Italy after her conquest of Abyssinia. "Chips" Channon described him as the "unprepossessing, bookish, eccentric member for Stockton-on-Tees" and recorded (8 July 1936) that he had been sent a "frigid note" by Conservative Prime Minister Stanley Baldwin. Baldwin later mentioned that he had survived by steering a middle course between Macmillan and John Gretton, an extreme right-winger.

The Next Five Years Group, to which Macmillan had belonged, was wound up in November 1937. His book The Middle Way appeared in June 1938, advocating a broadly centrist political philosophy both domestically and internationally. Macmillan took control of the magazine New Outlook and made sure it published political tracts rather than purely theoretical work.

In 1936, Macmillan proposed the creation of a cross-party forum of antifascists to create democratic unity but his ideas were rejected by the leadership of both the Labour and Conservative parties.

Macmillan supported Chamberlain's first flight for talks with Hitler at Berchtesgaden, but not his subsequent flights to Bad Godesberg and Munich. After Munich he was looking for a "1931 in reverse", i.e. a Labour-dominated coalition in which some Conservatives would serve, the reverse of the Conservative-dominated coalition which had governed Britain since 1931. He supported the independent candidate, Lindsay, at the 1938 Oxford by-election. He wrote a pamphlet "The Price of Peace" calling for alliance between Britain, France and the USSR, but expecting Poland to make territorial "accommodation" to Germany (i.e. give up the Danzig corridor). In "Economic Aspects of Defence", early in 1939, he called for a Ministry of Supply.

=== Phoney War (1939–1940) ===
Macmillan visited Finland in February 1940, then the subject of great sympathy in Britain as it was being invaded by the USSR, then allied to Nazi Germany. His last speech from the backbenches was to attack the government for not doing enough to help Finland. Britain was saved from a potentially embarrassing commitment when the Winter War ended in March 1940.

Macmillan voted against the Government in the Norway Debate of May 1940, helping to bring down Neville Chamberlain as prime minister, and tried to join in with Colonel Josiah Wedgwood singing "Rule, Britannia!" in the House of Commons Chamber.

=== Parliamentary Secretary, Ministry of Supply (1940–1942) ===
Macmillan finally attained office by serving in the wartime coalition government as the Parliamentary Secretary to the Ministry of Supply from 1940. Channon commented (29 May 1940) that there was "some amusement over Harold Macmillan's so obvious enjoyment of his new position".

Macmillan's job was to provide armaments and other equipment to the British Army and Royal Air Force. He travelled up and down the country to co-ordinate production, working with some success under Lord Beaverbrook to increase the supply and quality of armoured vehicles.

=== Colonial Under-Secretary (1942) ===
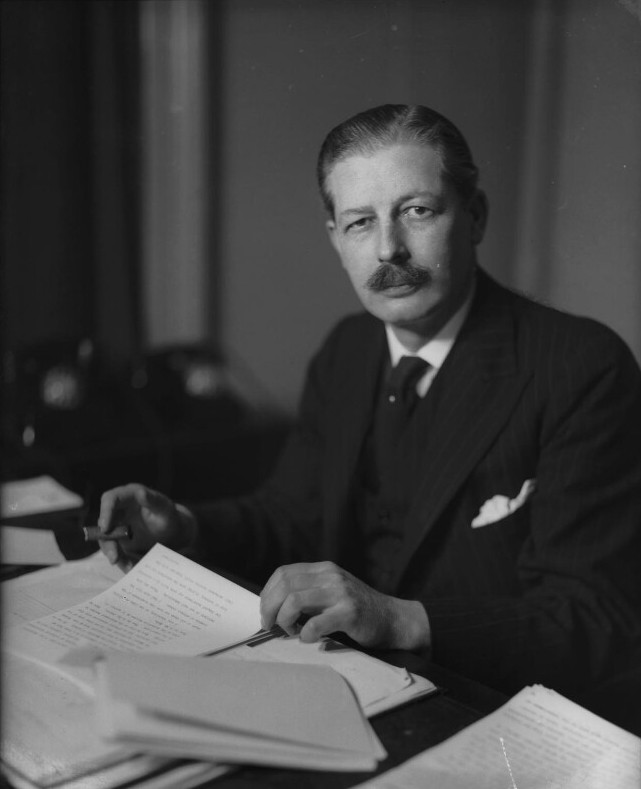
Macmillan in 1942

Macmillan was appointed Under-Secretary of State for the Colonies in 1942, in his own words "leaving a madhouse to enter a mausoleum". Though a junior minister he was a member of the Privy Council, and he spoke in the House of Commons for Colonial Secretaries Lord Moyne and Lord Cranborne. Macmillan was given responsibility for increasing colonial production and trade, and signalled the future policy direction when in June 1942 he declared:

The governing principle of the Colonial Empire should be the principle of partnership between the various elements composing it. Out of partnership comes understanding and friendship. Within the fabric of the Commonwealth lies the future of the Colonial territories.

Macmillan predicted that the Conservatives faced landslide defeat after the war, causing Channon to write (6 Sep 1944) of "the foolish prophecy of that nice ass Harold Macmillan". In October 1942 Harold Nicolson recorded Macmillan as predicting "extreme socialism" after the war. Macmillan nearly resigned when Oliver Stanley was appointed Secretary of State in November 1942, as he would no longer be the spokesman in the Commons as he had been under Cranborne. Brendan Bracken advised him not to quit.

=== Minister Resident in the Mediterranean (1942–1945) ===
After Harry Crookshank had refused the job, Macmillan attained real power and Cabinet rank late in 1942 as British Minister Resident at Algiers in the Mediterranean, recently liberated in Operation Torch. He reported directly to the Prime Minister instead of to the Foreign Secretary, Anthony Eden. Oliver Lyttelton had a similar job at Cairo, while Robert Murphy was Macmillan's US counterpart. Macmillan built a rapport with US General Dwight D. Eisenhower, then Supreme Allied Commander in the Mediterranean (SACMED), which proved helpful in his career, and Richard Crossman later recalled that Macmillan's "Greeks in the Roman Empire" metaphor dated from this time (i.e., that as the US replaced Britain as the world's leading power, British politicians and diplomats should aim to guide her in the same way that Greek slaves and freedmen had advised powerful Romans). Macmillan told Crossman: "We, my dear Crossman, are the Greeks in the American empire. You will find the Americans much as the Greeks found the Romans—great big, vulgar bustling people, more vigorous than we are and also more idle, with more unspoiled virtues, but also more corrupt. We must run AFHQ (Allied Forces Headquarters) as the Greek slaves ran the operations of the Emperor Claudius". At the Casablanca Conference Macmillan helped to secure US acceptance, if not recognition, of the Free French leader Charles de Gaulle. Macmillan wrote in his diary during the Casablanca conference: "I christened the two personalities the Emperor of the East and the Emperor of the West and indeed it was rather like a meeting of the late Roman empire". For Macmillan, the "remarkable and romantic episodes" as President Roosevelt met Prime Minister Churchill in Casablanca convinced him that personal diplomacy was the best way to deal with Americans, which later influenced his foreign policy as prime minister.

On 22 February 1943, Macmillan was badly burned in a plane crash, re-entering the wreckage to rescue a Frenchman and escaping just before the plane exploded. He had to have a plaster cast put on his face. In his delirium he imagined himself back in a Somme casualty clearing station and asked for a message to be passed to his mother, now dead.

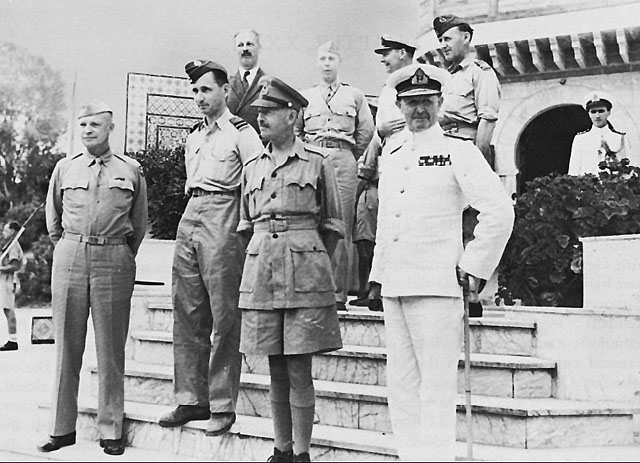
Macmillan (top row, left) with Allied military leaders in the Sicilian campaign, 1943; Maj-Gen Bedell Smith to his left. Front row: General Eisenhower (then Supreme Commander, Mediterranean), Air Chief Marshal Tedder, General Alexander, Admiral Cunningham

Together with Gladwyn Jebb he helped to negotiate the Italian armistice in August 1943, between the fall of Sicily and the Salerno Landings. This caused friction with Eden and the Foreign Office. He was based at Caserta for the rest of the war. He was appointed UK High Commissioner for the Advisory Council for Italy late in 1943. He visited London in October 1943 and again clashed with Eden. Eden appointed Duff Cooper as Representative to the Free French government in Algeria (after the liberation of mainland France, he later continued as Ambassador to France from November 1944) and Noel Charles as Ambassador to Italy to reduce Macmillan's influence. In May 1944 Macmillan infuriated Eden by demanding an early peace treaty with Italy (at that time a pro-Allied regime under Badoglio held some power in the southern, liberated, part of Italy), a move which Churchill favoured. In June 1944 he argued for a British-led thrust up the Ljubljana Gap into Central Europe (Operation "Armpit") instead of the planned diversion of US and Free French forces to the South of France (Operation Dragoon). This proposal impressed Churchill and General Alexander, but did not meet with American approval. Eden sent out Robert Dixon to abolish the job of Resident Minister, there being then no job for Macmillan back in the UK, but he managed to prevent his job being abolished. Churchill visited Italy in August 1944. On 14 September 1944 Macmillan was appointed Chief Commissioner of the Allied Control Commission for Italy (in succession to General Noel Mason-MacFarlane). He continued to be British Minister Resident at Allied Headquarters and British political adviser to "Jumbo" Wilson, now Supreme Commander, Mediterranean. On 10 November 1944 he was appointed Acting President of the Allied Commission (the Supreme Commander being President).

Macmillan visited Greece on 11 December 1944. As the Germans had withdrawn, British troops under General Scobie had deployed to Athens, but there were concerns that the pro-communist Greek resistance, EAM and its military wing ELAS, would take power (see Dekemvriana) or come into conflict with British troops. Macmillan rode in a tank and was under sniper fire at the British Embassy. Despite the hostility of large sections of British and American opinion, who were sympathetic to the guerrillas and hostile to what was seen as imperialist behaviour, he persuaded a reluctant Churchill, who visited Athens later in the month, to accept Archbishop Damaskinos as Regent on behalf of the exiled King George II. A truce was negotiated in January 1945, enabling a pro-British regime to remain in power, as Churchill had demanded in the Percentages agreement the previous autumn. In 1947 the US would take over Britain's role as "protector" of Greece and Turkey, to keep the Soviets out of the Mediterranean, the so-called "Truman Doctrine".

Macmillan was also the minister advising General Keightley of V Corps, the senior Allied commander in Austria responsible for the repatriation of Cossack collaborators and the Bleiburg repatriations, which included the forced handovers of up to 70,000 prisoners of war to the Soviet Union and Josip Broz Tito's Yugoslavia in 1945. The deportations and Macmillan's involvement later became a source of controversy because of the harsh treatment meted out to Nazi collaborators and forces responsible for anti-partisan reprisals by the receiving countries, and because in the confusion V Corps went beyond the terms agreed at the Yalta Conference and Allied Forces Headquarters directives by repatriating 4,000 of White émigrés and 11,000 civilian family members.

=== Air Secretary (1945) ===
Macmillan toyed with an offer to succeed Duff Cooper as MP for the safe Conservative seat of Westminster St George's. Criticised locally for his long absence, he suggested that Lady Dorothy stand for Stockton in 1945, as she had been nursing the seat for five years. She was apparently willing. However, it was thought better for him to be seen to defend his seat, and Lord Beaverbrook had already spoken to Churchill to arrange that Macmillan be given another seat in the event of defeat.

Macmillan returned to England after the European war, feeling himself 'almost a stranger at home'. He was Secretary of State for Air for two months in Churchill's caretaker government, 'much of which was taken up in electioneering', there being 'nothing much to be done in the way of forward planning'.

=== Opposition (1945–1951) ===
Macmillan indeed lost Stockton in the landslide Labour victory of July 1945, but returned to Parliament in the November 1945 by-election in Bromley. In his diary Harold Nicolson noted the feelings of the Tory backbenchers: "They feel that Winston is too old and Anthony (Eden) too weak. They want Harold Macmillan to lead them."

He was a member of the British delegation to the Consultative Assembly of the Council of Europe from 1949 to 1951, and played a prominent role – as a key aide and ally of Winston Churchill – in pressing for greater European integration as a bulwark against Soviet totalitarianism and to prevent a recurrence of the horrors of Nazi rule.

Although Macmillan played an important role in drafting the "Industrial Charter" ("Crossbencher" in the Sunday Express called it the second edition of The Middle Way) he now, as MP for a safe seat, adopted a somewhat more right-wing public persona, defending private enterprise and fiercely opposing the Labour government in the House of Commons.

== Political career, 1951–1957 ==
=== Housing Minister (1951–1954) ===
With the Conservative victory in 1951 Macmillan became Minister of Housing & Local Government under Churchill, who entrusted him with fulfilling the pledge to build 300,000 houses per year (up from the previous target of 200,000 a year), made in response to a speech from the floor at the 1950 Party Conference. Macmillan thought at first that Housing, which ranked 13 out of 16 in the Cabinet list, was a poisoned chalice, writing in his diary (28 October 1951) that it was "not my cup of tea at all ... I really haven't a clue how to set about the job". It meant obtaining scarce steel, cement and timber when the Treasury were trying to maximise exports and minimise imports. 'It is a gamble—it will make or mar your political career,' Churchill said, 'but every humble home will bless your name if you succeed.'

By July 1952 Macmillan was already criticising Butler (then Chancellor of the Exchequer) in his diary, accusing him of "dislik(ing) and fear(ing) him"; in fact there is no evidence that Butler regarded Macmillan as a rival at this stage. In April 1953 Beaverbrook encouraged Macmillan to think that in a future leadership contest he might emerge in a dead heat between Eden and Butler, as the young Beaverbrook (Max Aitken as he had been at the time) had helped Bonar Law to do in 1911. In July 1953 Macmillan considered postponing his gall bladder operation in case Churchill, who had just suffered a serious stroke while Eden was also in hospital, had to step down.

Macmillan achieved his housing target by the end of 1953, a year ahead of schedule.

=== Minister of Defence (1954–1955) ===
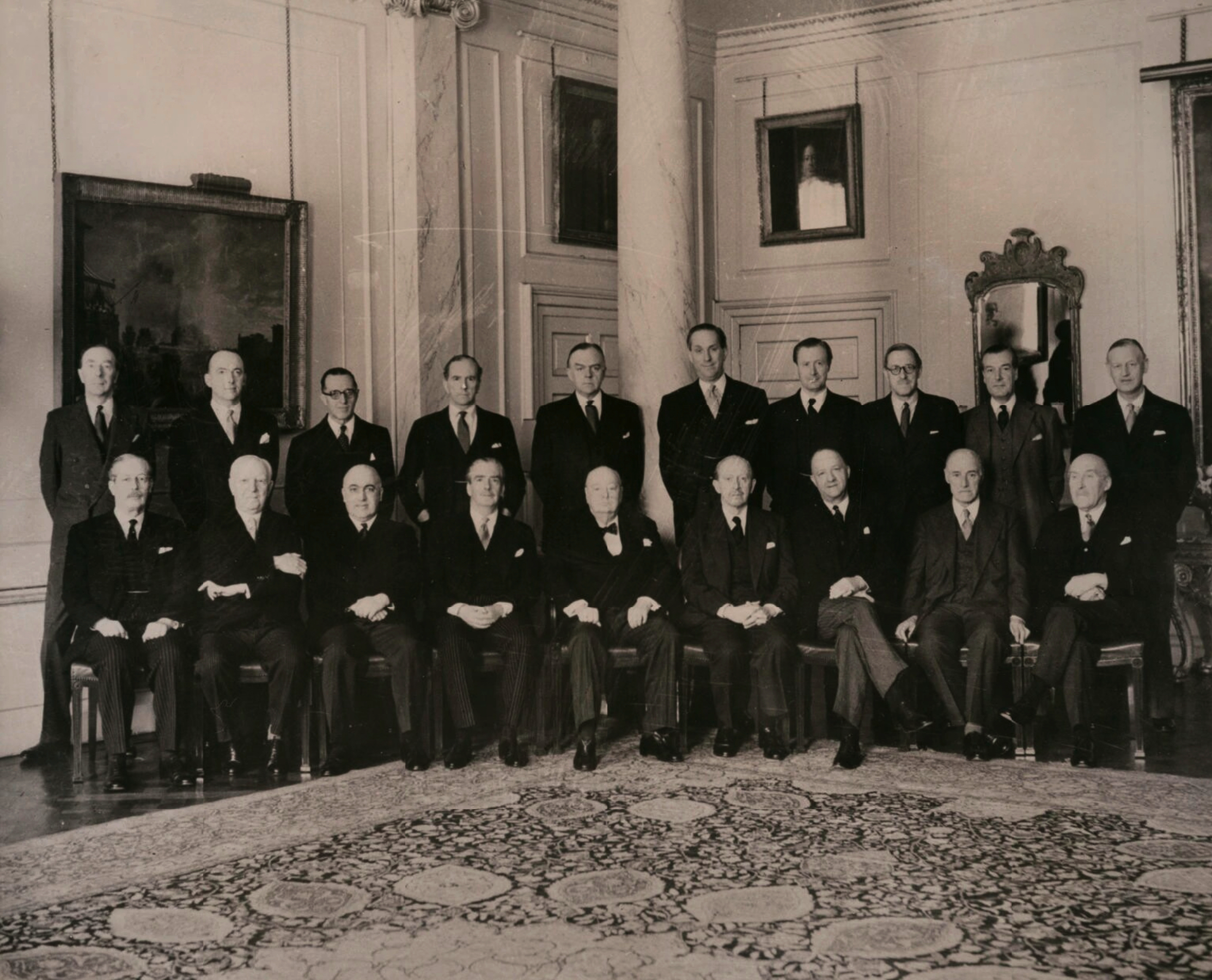
Churchill's cabinet, 1955 (Macmillan sitting on the far left)

Macmillan was Minister of Defence from October 1954, but found his authority restricted by Churchill's personal involvement. In the opinion of The Economist: 'He gave the impression that his own undoubted capacity for imaginative running of his own show melted way when an august superior was breathing down his neck.'

A major theme of his tenure at Defence was the ministry's growing reliance on the nuclear deterrent, in the view of some critics, to the detriment of conventional forces. The Defence White Paper of February 1955, announcing the decision to produce the hydrogen bomb, received cross-party support.

"It breaks my heart to see the lion-hearted Churchill begin to sink into a sort of Pétain", Macmillan wrote in his diary as the Prime Minister's mental and physical powers visibly decayed. Macmillan was one of the few ministers brave enough to tell Churchill to his face that it was time for him to retire. Philippe Pétain, a successful French general in the First World War, had become senile while heading the pro-German Vichy Regime.

During the Second World War Macmillan's toothy grin, baggy trousers and rimless glasses had given him, as his biographer puts it, "an air of an early Bolshevik leader". By the 1950s he had had his teeth capped, grew his hair in a more shapely style, wore Savile Row suits and walked with the ramrod bearing of a former Guards officer, acquiring the distinguished appearance of his later career. Campbell writes "there has been no more startling personal reinvention in British politics". He very often wore either an Old Etonian or a Brigade of Guards tie. Campbell also suggests that Harold Wilson's image change during Macmillan's premiership from "boring young statistician into lovable Yorkshire comic" was made in conscious imitation of Macmillan.

=== Foreign Secretary (1955) ===
Macmillan was Foreign Secretary in April–December 1955 in the government of Anthony Eden, who had taken over as prime minister from the retiring Churchill. Returning from the Geneva Summit of that year he made headlines by declaring: 'There ain't gonna be no war.' Of the role of Foreign Secretary Macmillan observed:

Nothing he can say can do very much good and almost anything he may say may do a great deal of harm. Anything he says that is not obvious is dangerous; whatever is not trite is risky. He is forever poised between the cliché and the indiscretion.

=== Chancellor of the Exchequer (1955–1957) ===
==== Budget ====
Macmillan was appointed Chancellor of the Exchequer in December 1955. He had enjoyed his eight months as Foreign Secretary and did not wish to move. He insisted on being "undisputed head of the home front" and that Eden's de facto deputy Rab Butler, whom he was replacing as Chancellor, not have the title "Deputy Prime Minister" and not be treated as senior to him. He even tried (in vain) to demand that Salisbury, not Butler, should preside over the Cabinet in Eden's absence. Macmillan later claimed in his memoirs that he had still expected Butler, his junior by eight years, to succeed Eden, but correspondence with Lord Woolton at the time makes clear that Macmillan was very much thinking of the succession. As early as January 1956 he told Eden's press secretary William D. Clark that it would be "interesting to see how long Anthony can stay in the saddle".

Macmillan planned to reverse the 6d cut in income tax which Butler had made a year previously, but backed off after a "frank talk" with Butler, who threatened resignation, on 28 March 1956. He settled for spending cuts instead, and himself threatened resignation until he was allowed to cut bread and milk subsidies, something the Cabinet had not permitted Butler to do.

One of his innovations at the Treasury was the introduction of premium bonds, announced in his budget of 17 April 1956. Although the Labour Opposition initially decried them as a 'squalid raffle', they proved an immediate hit with the public, with £1,000 won in the first prize draw in June 1957.

A young John Major attended the presentation of the budget, and attributes his political ambitions to this event.

==== Suez ====
In November 1956, Britain invaded Egypt in collusion with France and Israel in the Suez Crisis. According to Labour Shadow Chancellor Harold Wilson, Macmillan was 'first in, first out': first very supportive of the invasion, then a prime mover in Britain's humiliating withdrawal in the wake of the financial crisis caused by pressure from the US government. Since the Egyptian Revolution of 1952, relations between Britain and Egypt had deteriorated. The Egyptian government, which came to be dominated by Gamal Abdel Nasser, was opposed to the British military presence in the Arab World. The Egyptian nationalisation of the Suez Canal by Nasser on 26 July 1956 prompted the British government and the French government of Guy Mollet to commence plans for invading Egypt, regaining the canal, and toppling Nasser. Macmillan wrote in his diary: "If Nasser 'gets away with it', we are done for. The whole Arab world will despise us ... Nuri [es-Said, British-backed Prime Minister of Iraq] and our friends will fall. It may well be the end of British influence and strength forever. So, in the last resort, we must use force and defy opinion, here and overseas".

Macmillan threatened to resign if force was not used against Nasser. He was heavily involved in the secret planning of the invasion with France and Israel. It was he who first suggested collusion with Israel. On 5 August 1956 Macmillan met Churchill at Chartwell, and told him that the government's plan for simply regaining control of the canal was not enough and suggested involving Israel, recording in his diary for that day: "Surely, if we landed we must seek out the Egyptian forces; destroy them; and bring down Nasser's government. Churchill seemed to agree with all this." Macmillan knew President Eisenhower well, but misjudged his strong opposition to a military solution. Macmillan met Eisenhower privately on 25 September 1956 and convinced himself that the US would not oppose the invasion, despite the misgivings of the British Ambassador, Sir Roger Makins, who was also present. Macmillan failed to heed a warning from Secretary of State John Foster Dulles that whatever the British government did should wait until after the US presidential election on 6 November, and failed to report Dulles' remarks to Eden.

The treasury was his portfolio, but he did not recognise the financial disaster that could result from US government actions. Sterling was draining out of the Bank of England at an alarming rate. The canal was blocked by the Egyptians, and most oil shipments were delayed as tankers had to go around Africa. The US government refused any financial help until Britain withdrew its forces from Egypt. When he did realise this, he changed his mind and called for withdrawal on US terms, while exaggerating the financial crisis. On 6 November Macmillan informed the Cabinet that Britain had lost $370m in the first few days of November alone. Faced with Macmillan's prediction of doom, the cabinet had no choice but to accept these terms and withdraw. The Canal remained in Egyptian hands, and Nasser's government continued its support of Arab and African national resistance movements opposed to the British and French presence in the region and on the continent.

In later life Macmillan was open about his failure to read Eisenhower's thoughts correctly and much regretted the damage done to Anglo-American relations, but always maintained that the Anglo-French military response to the nationalisation of the Canal had been for the best. D. R. Thorpe rejects the charge that Macmillan deliberately played false over Suez (i.e. encouraged Eden to attack in order to destroy him as prime minister), noting that Macmillan privately put the chances of success at 51–49.

==== Succession to Eden ====
Britain's humiliation at the hands of the US caused deep anger among Conservative MPs. After the ceasefire a motion on the Order Paper attacking the US for "gravely endangering the Atlantic Alliance" attracted the signatures of over a hundred MPs. Macmillan tried, but failed, to see Eisenhower (who was also refusing to see Foreign Secretary Selwyn Lloyd) behind Butler's and Eden's back. Macmillan had a number of meetings with US Ambassador Winthrop Aldrich, in which he said that if he were prime minister the US Administration would find him much more amenable. Eisenhower encouraged Aldrich to have further meetings. Macmillan and Butler met Aldrich on 21 November. Eisenhower spoke highly of Macmillan ("A straight, fine man, and so far as he is concerned, the outstanding one of the British he served with during the war").

On the evening of 22 November 1956 Butler, who had just announced British withdrawal, addressed the 1922 Committee (Conservative backbenchers) with Macmillan. After Butler's downbeat remarks, ten minutes or so in length, Macmillan delivered a stirring 35-minute speech described by Enoch Powell as "one of the most horrible things that I remember in politics ... (Macmillan) with all the skill of the old actor manager succeeded in false-footing Rab. The sheer devilry of it verged upon the disgusting." He expounded on his metaphor that henceforth the British must aim to be "Greeks in the Roman Empire", and according to Philip Goodhart's recollection almost knocked Butler off his chair with his expansive arm gestures. Macmillan wrote "I held the Tory Party for the weekend, it was all I intended to do". Macmillan had further meetings with Aldrich and Winston Churchill after Eden left for Jamaica (23 November) while briefing journalists (disingenuously) that he planned to retire and go to the Lords. He was also hinting that he would not serve under Butler.

Butler later recorded that during his period as acting Head of Government at Number 10, he noticed constant comings and goings of ministers to Macmillan's study in Number 11 next door, and that those who attended all seemed to receive promotions when Macmillan became prime minister. Macmillan had opposed Eden's trip to Jamaica and told Butler (15 December, the day after Eden's return) that younger members of the Cabinet wanted Eden out. Macmillan argued at Cabinet on 4 January that Suez should be regarded as a "strategic retreat" like Mons or Dunkirk. This did not meet with Eden's approval at Cabinet on 7 January.

His political standing destroyed, Eden resigned on grounds of ill health on 9 January 1957. At that time the Conservative Party had no formal mechanism for selecting a new leader, and Queen Elizabeth II appointed Macmillan Prime Minister after taking advice from Churchill and the Marquess of Salisbury, who had asked the Cabinet individually for their opinions, all but two or three opting for Macmillan. This surprised some observers who had expected that Eden's deputy Rab Butler would be chosen. The political situation after Suez was so desperate that on taking office on 10 January he told the Queen he could not guarantee his government would last "six weeks", though ultimately he would be in charge of the government for more than six years.

== Premiership (1957–1963) ==
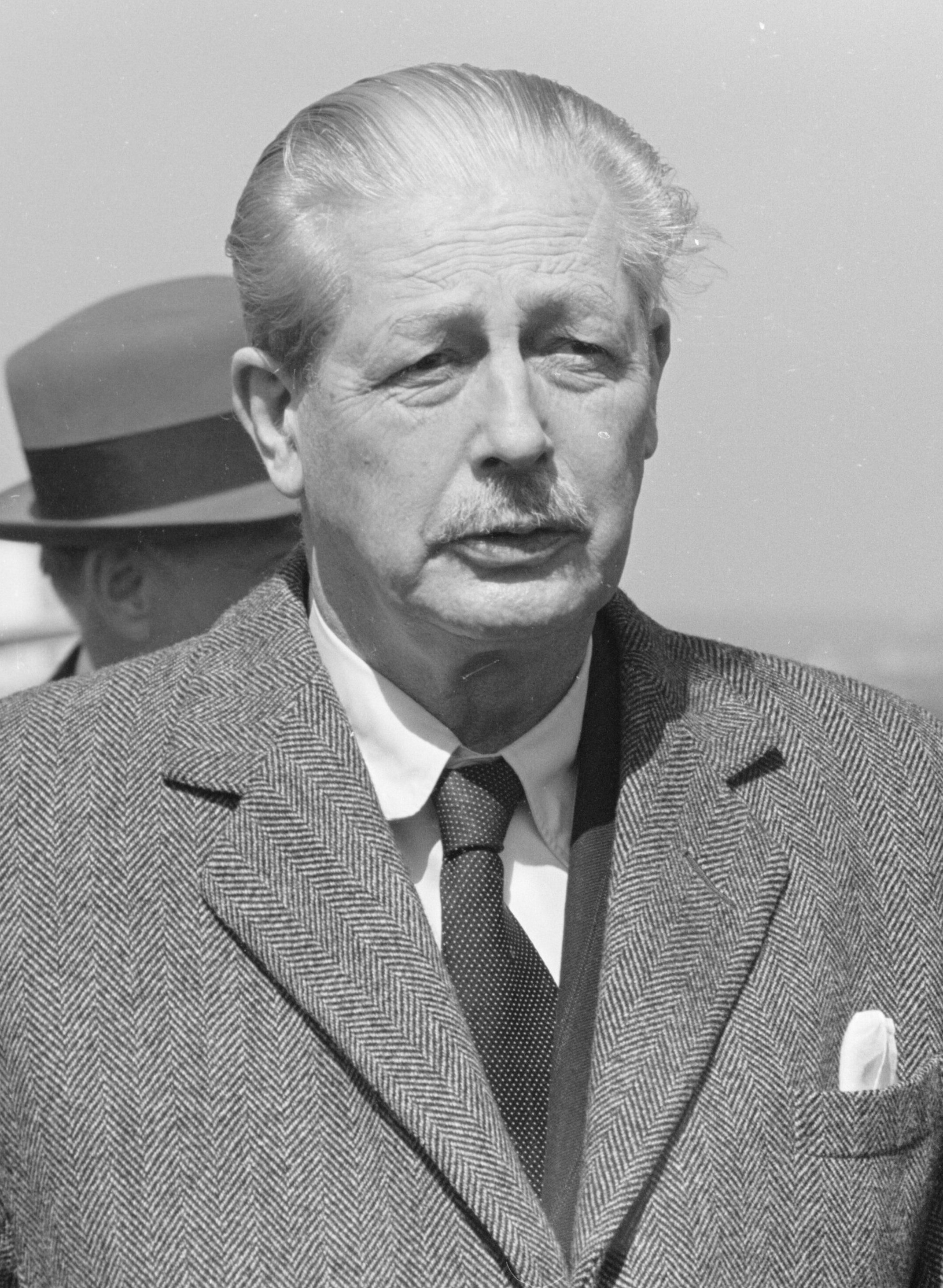
- Macmillan in 1959
- Premiership of Harold Macmillan; 10 January 1957 – 18 October 1963
- Monarch: Elizabeth II
- Prime Minister: Harold Macmillan
- Cabinet: Macmillan ministry
- Party: Conservative
- Election: 1959
- Seat: 10 Downing Street
- Coat of arms of HM Government

=== First government, 1957–1959 ===
From the start of his premiership, Macmillan set out to portray an image of calm and style, in contrast to his excitable predecessor. He silenced the klaxon on the Prime Ministerial car, which Eden had used frequently. He advertised his love of reading Anthony Trollope and Jane Austen, and on the door of the Private Secretaries' room at Number Ten he hung a quote from The Gondoliers: "Quiet, calm deliberation disentangles every knot".

Macmillan filled government posts with 35 Old Etonians, seven of them in Cabinet. He was also devoted to family members: when Andrew Cavendish, 11th Duke of Devonshire was later appointed (Minister for Colonial Affairs from 1963 to 1964 among other positions) he described his uncle's behaviour as "the greatest act of nepotism ever".

Macmillan's Defence Minister, Duncan Sandys, wrote at the time: "Eden had no gift for leadership; under Macmillan as PM everything is better, Cabinet meetings are quite transformed". Many ministers found Macmillan to be more decisive and brisk than either Churchill or Eden had been. Another of Macmillan's ministers, Charles Hill, stated that Macmillan dominated Cabinet meetings "by sheer superiority of mind and of judgement". Macmillan frequently made allusions to history, literature and the classics at cabinet meetings, giving him a reputation as being both learned and entertaining, though many ministers found his manner too authoritarian. Macmillan had no "inner cabinet", and instead maintained one-on-one relationships with a few senior ministers such as Rab Butler who usually served as acting prime minister when Macmillan was on one of his frequent visits abroad. Selwyn Lloyd described Macmillan as treating most of his ministers like "junior officers in a unit he commanded". Lloyd recalled that Macmillan: "regarded the Cabinet as an instrument to play upon, a body to be molded to his will...very rarely did he fail to get his way" Macmillan generally allowed his ministers much leeway in managing their portfolios, and only intervened if he felt something had gone wrong. Macmillan was especially close to his three private secretaries, Tom Bligh, Freddie Bishop and Philip de Zulueta, who were his favourite advisers. Many cabinet ministers often complained that Macmillan took the advice of his private secretaries more seriously than he did their own.

He was nicknamed "Supermac" in 1958 by the cartoonist Victor Weisz, who intended to suggest that Macmillan was trying set himself up as a "Superman" figure. It was intended as mockery but backfired, coming to be used in a neutral or friendly fashion. Weisz tried to label him with other names, including "Mac the Knife" at the time of widespread cabinet changes in 1962, but none caught on.

==== Economy ====
Besides foreign affairs, the economy was Macmillan's other prime concern. His One Nation approach to the economy was to seek high or full employment, especially with a general election looming. This contrasted with the Treasury ministers who argued that support of sterling required spending cuts and, probably, a rise in unemployment. Their advice was rejected and in January 1958 the three Treasury ministers — Peter Thorneycroft, the Chancellor of the Exchequer, Nigel Birch, Economic Secretary to the Treasury, and Enoch Powell, the Financial Secretary to the Treasury and seen as their intellectual ringleader — resigned. D. R. Thorpe argues that this, coming after the resignations of Labour ministers Aneurin Bevan, John Freeman and Harold Wilson in April 1951 (who had wanted higher expenditure), and the cuts made by Butler and Macmillan as Chancellors in 1955–56, was another step in the development of "stop-go" economics, as opposed to prudent medium-term management. Macmillan, away on a tour of the Commonwealth, brushed aside this incident as "a little local difficulty". He bore no grudge against Thorneycroft and brought him and Powell, of whom he was more wary, back into the government in 1960.

This period also saw the first stirrings of more active monetary policy. Official bank rate, which had been kept low since the 1930s, was hiked in September 1958. The change in bank rate prompted rumours in the City that some financiers – who were Bank of England directors with senior positions in private firms – took advantage of advance knowledge of the rate change in what resembled insider trading. Political pressure mounted on the Government, and Macmillan agreed to the 1957 Bank Rate Tribunal. Hearing evidence in the winter of 1957 and reporting in January 1958, this inquiry exonerated all involved in what some journalists perceived to be a whitewash.

==== Domestic policies ====
During his time as prime minister, average living standards steadily rose while numerous social reforms were carried out. The Clean Air Act 1956 was passed during his time as Chancellor; his premiership saw the passage of the Housing Act 1957, the Offices Act 1960, the Noise Abatement Act 1960, and the Factories Act 1961; the introduction of a graduated pension scheme to provide an additional income to retirees, the establishment of a Child's Special Allowance for the orphaned children of divorced parents, and a reduction in the standard work week from 48 to 42 hours.

==== Foreign policy ====
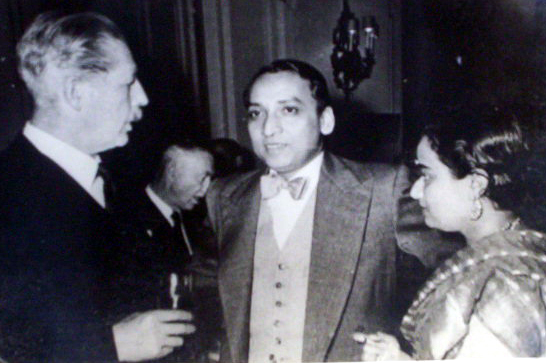
Macmillan with Indian Minister and head of Indian delegation Ashoke Kumar Sen and wife Anjana, daughter of Sudhi Ranjan Das

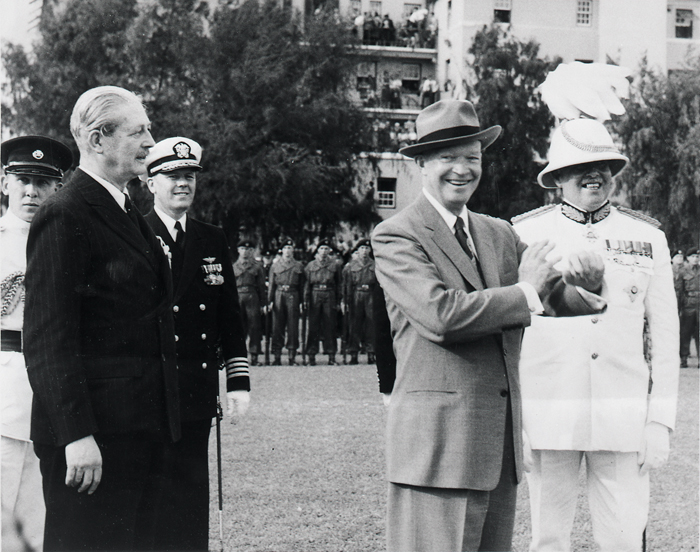
Macmillan meeting Eisenhower in Bermuda

Macmillan took close control of foreign policy. He worked to narrow the post-Suez Crisis (1956) rift with the United States, where his wartime friendship with Eisenhower was key; the two had a productive conference in Bermuda as early as March 1957.

In February 1959, Macmillan visited the Soviet Union. Talks with Nikita Khrushchev eased tensions in east–west relations over West Berlin and led to an agreement in principle to stop nuclear tests and to hold a further summit meeting of Allied and Soviet heads of government.

In the Middle East, faced by the 1958 collapse of the Baghdad Pact and the spread of Soviet influence, Macmillan acted decisively to restore the confidence of Persian Gulf allies, using the Royal Air Force and special forces to defeat a revolt backed by Saudi Arabia and Egypt against the Sultan of Oman, Said bin Taimur, in July 1957; deploying airborne battalions to defend Jordan against United Arab Republican subversion in July 1958; and deterring Iraqi demands of Kuwait by landing a brigade group in June 1961 during the Iraq–Kuwait crisis of 1961 .

Macmillan was a major proponent and architect of decolonisation. The Gold Coast was granted independence as Ghana, and the Federation of Malaya achieved independence within the Commonwealth of Nations in 1957. "The material strength of the Old Commonwealth members, if joined with the moral influence of the Asiatic members, meant that a united Commonwealth would always have a very powerful voice in world affairs," said Macmillan in a 1957 speech during a tour of the former British Empire.

==== Nuclear weapons ====
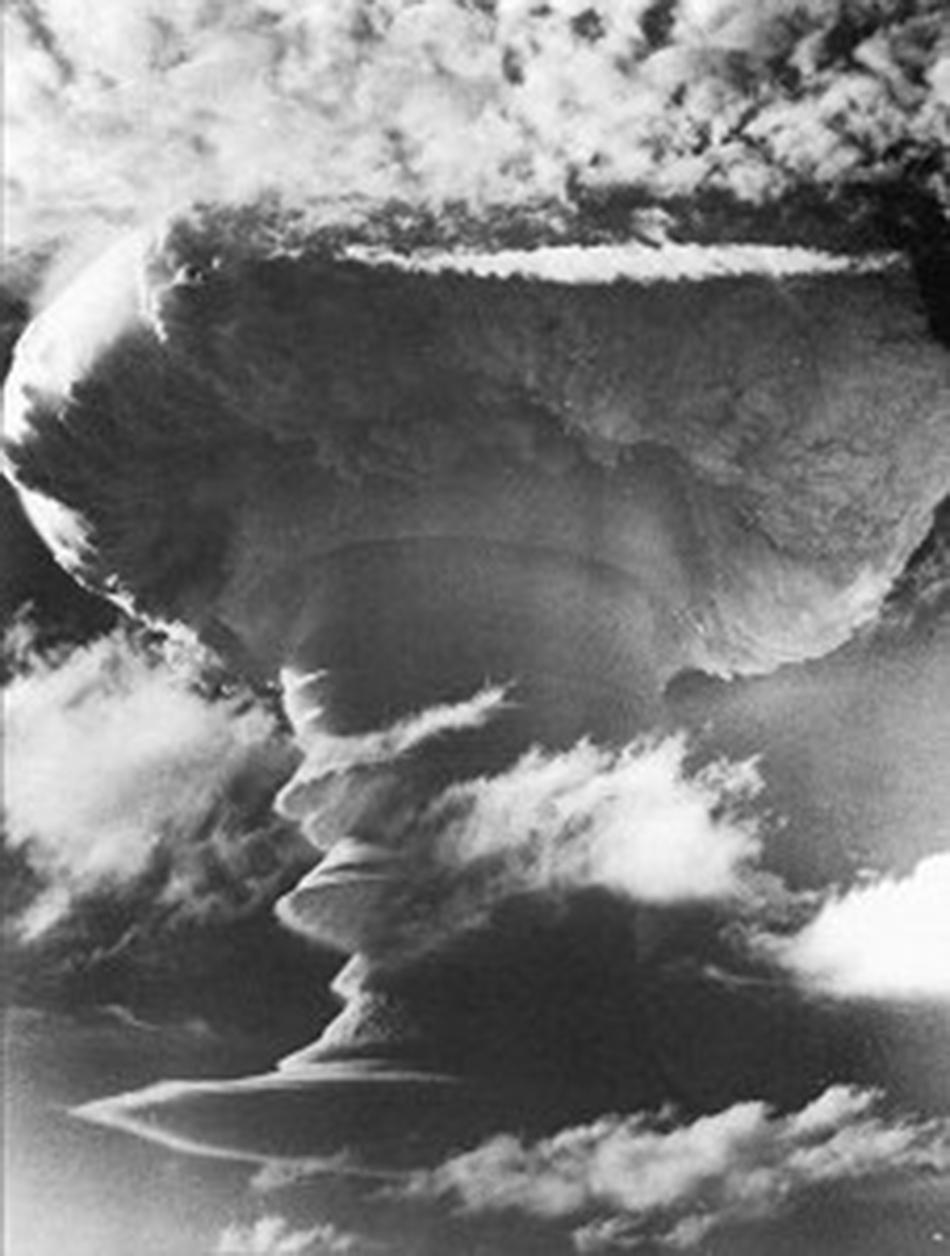
First successful British H-bomb test—Operation Grapple X Round C1, which took place over Kiritimati

In April 1957, Macmillan reaffirmed his strong support for the British nuclear weapons programme. A succession of prime ministers since the Second World War had been determined to persuade the United States to revive wartime co-operation in the area of nuclear weapons research. Macmillan believed that one way to encourage such co-operation would be for the United Kingdom to speed up the development of its own hydrogen bomb, which was successfully tested on 8 November 1957.

Macmillan's decision led to increased demands on the Windscale and (subsequently) Calder Hall nuclear plants to produce plutonium for military purposes. As a result, safety margins for radioactive materials inside the Windscale reactor were eroded. This contributed to the Windscale fire on the night of 10 October 1957, which broke out in the plutonium plant of Pile No. 1, and nuclear contaminants travelled up a chimney where the filters blocked some, but not all, of the contaminated material. The radioactive cloud spread to south-east England and fallout reached mainland Europe. Although scientists had warned of the dangers of such an accident for some time, the government blamed the workers who had put out the fire for 'an error of judgement', rather than the political pressure for fast-tracking the megaton bomb.

Concerned that public confidence in the nuclear programme might be shaken and that technical information might be misused by opponents of defence co-operation in the US Congress, Macmillan withheld all but the summary of a report into the fire prepared for the Atomic Energy Authority by Sir William Penney, director of the Atomic Weapons Research Establishment. Subsequently released files show that 'Macmillan's cuts were few and covered up few technical details', and that even the full report found no danger to public health, but later official estimates acknowledged that the release of polonium-210 may have led directly to 25 to 50 deaths, and anti-nuclear groups linked it to 1,000 fatal cancers.

On 25 March 1957, Macmillan acceded to Eisenhower's request to base 60 Thor IRBMs in England under joint control to replace the nuclear bombers of the Strategic Air Command, which had been stationed under joint control since 1948 and were approaching obsolescence. Partly as a consequence of this favour, in late October 1957 the US McMahon Act was eased to facilitate nuclear co-operation between the two governments, initially with a view to producing cleaner weapons and reducing the need for duplicate testing. The Mutual Defence Agreement followed on 3 July 1958, speeding up British ballistic missile development, notwithstanding unease expressed at the time about the impetus co-operation might give to atomic proliferation by arousing the jealousy of France and other allies.

Macmillan saw an opportunity to increase British influence over the United States with the launching of the Soviet satellite Sputnik, which caused a severe crisis of confidence in the United States as Macmillan wrote in his diary: "The Russian success in launching the satellite has been something equivalent to Pearl Harbour. The American cockiness is shaken....President is under severe attack for the first time...The atmosphere is now such that almost anything might be decided, however revolutionary". The "revolutionary" change that Macmillan sought was a more equal Anglo-American partnership as he used the Sputnik crisis to press Eisenhower to in turn press Congress to repeal the 1946 MacMahon Act, which forbade the United States to share nuclear technology with foreign governments, a goal accomplished by the end of 1957.

In addition, Macmillan succeeded in having Eisenhower to agree to set up Anglo-American "working groups" to examine foreign policy problems and for what he called the "Declaration of Interdependence" (a title not used by the Americans who called it the "Declaration of Common Purpose"), which he believed marked the beginning of a new era of Anglo-American partnership. Subsequently, Macmillan was to learn that neither Eisenhower nor Kennedy shared the assumption that he applied to the "Declaration of Interdependence" that the American president and the British Prime Minister had equal power over the decisions of war and peace. Macmillan believed that the American policies towards the Soviet Union were too rigid and confrontational, and favoured a policy of détente with the aim of relaxing Cold War tensions.

==== 1959 general election ====
Macmillan led the Conservatives to victory in the 1959 general election, increasing his party's majority from 60 to 100 seats. The campaign was based on the economic improvements achieved as well as the low unemployment and improving standard of living; the slogan "Life's Better Under the Conservatives" was matched by Macmillan's own 1957 remark, "indeed let us be frank about it—most of our people have never had it so good," usually paraphrased as "You've never had it so good." Such rhetoric reflected a new reality of working-class affluence; it has been argued that "the key factor in the Conservative victory was that average real pay for industrial workers had risen since Churchill's 1951 victory by over 20 per cent". The scale of the victory meant that not only had the Conservatives won three successive general elections, but they had also increased their majority each time. It sparked debate as to whether Labour (now led by Hugh Gaitskell) could win a general election again. The standard of living had risen enough that workers could participate in a consumer economy, shifting the working class concerns away from traditional Labour Party views.

=== Second government, 1959–1963 ===
==== Economy ====
Britain's balance of payments problems led Chancellor Selwyn Lloyd to impose a seven-month wage freeze in 1961 and, amongst other factors, this caused the government to lose popularity and a series of by-elections in March 1962, of which the most famous was Orpington on 14 March. Butler leaked to the Daily Mail on 11 July 1962 that a major reshuffle was imminent. Macmillan feared for his own position and later (1 August) claimed to Lloyd that Butler, who sat for a rural East Anglian seat likely to suffer from EC agricultural protectionism, had been planning to split the party over EC entry (there is no evidence that this was so).

In the 1962 cabinet reshuffle known as the "Night of the Long Knives", Macmillan sacked eight Ministers, including Selwyn Lloyd. The Cabinet changes were widely seen as a sign of panic, and the young Liberal MP Jeremy Thorpe said of Macmillan's dismissals, "greater love hath no man than this, than to lay down his friends for his life". Macmillan was openly criticised by his predecessor Lord Avon, an almost unprecedented act.

Macmillan supported the creation of the National Economic Development Council (NEDC, known as "Neddy"), which was announced in the summer of 1961 and first met in 1962. However, the National Incomes Commission (NIC, known as "Nicky"), set up in October 1962 to institute controls on income as part of his growth-without-inflation policy, proved less effective. This was largely due to employers and the Trades Union Congress (TUC) boycotting it. A further series of subtle indicators and controls was introduced during his premiership.

The report The Reshaping of British Railways (or Beeching I report) was published on 27 March 1963. The report starts by quoting the brief provided by the prime minister, Harold Macmillan, from 1960, "First, the industry must be of a size and pattern suited to modern conditions and prospects. In particular, the railway system must be modelled to meet current needs, and the modernisation plan must be adapted to this new shape", (Note: RB(1963a), p. 1.) and with the premise that the railways should be run as a profitable business. (Note: RB(1963a), p. 2. "It is, of course the responsibility of the British Railways Board so to shape and operate the railways as to make them pay.") This led to the notorious Beeching Axe, destroying many miles of permanent way and severing towns from the railway network.

==== Foreign policy ====
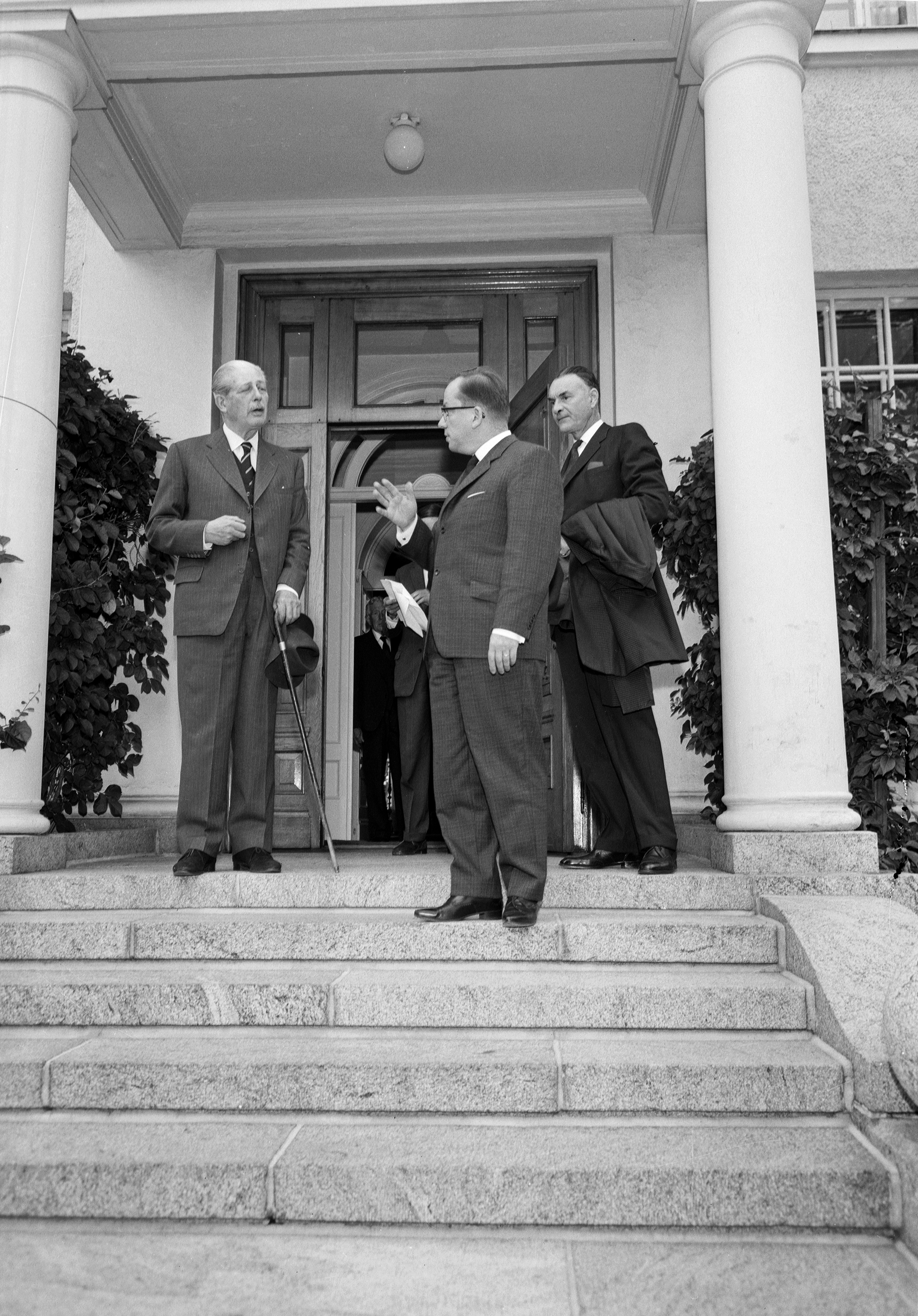
Macmillan (left) on 1 August 1961 in Valkeakoski, Finland. In the middle, the Finnish Minister Ahti Karjalainen, and Sir Anthony Lambert standing to the right.

In the age of jet aircraft Macmillan travelled more than any previous prime minister, apart from Lloyd George who made many trips to conferences in 1919–22. Macmillan planned an important role in setting up a four power summit in Paris to discuss the Berlin crisis that was supposed to open in May 1960, but which Khrushchev refused to attend owing to the U-2 incident. Macmillan pressed Eisenhower to apologise to Khrushchev, which the president refused to do. Macmillan's failure to make Eisenhower "say sorry" to Khrushchev forced him to reconsider his "Greeks and Romans" foreign policy as he privately conceded that could no "longer talk usefully to the Americans".

The failure of the Paris summit changed Macmillan's attitude towards the European Economic Community, which he started to see as a counterbalance to American power. At the same time, the Anglo-American "working groups", which Macmillan attached such importance to turned out to be largely ineffective as the Americans did not wish to have their options limited by a British veto; by in-fighting between agencies of the U.S. government such as the State Department, Defense Department, etc.; and because of the Maclean-Burgess affair of 1951 the Americans believed the British government was full of Soviet spies and thus could not be trusted.

===== Relations with the United States =====
The special relationship with the United States continued after the election of President John F. Kennedy, whose sister Kathleen Cavendish had married William Cavendish, Marquess of Hartington, the nephew of Macmillan's wife. Macmillan initially was concerned that the Irish-American Catholic Kennedy might be an Anglophobe, which led Macmillan, who knew of Kennedy's special interest in the Third World, to suggest that Britain and the United States spend more money on aid to the Third World. The emphasis on aid to the Third World also coincided well with Macmillan's "one nation conservatism" as he wrote in a letter to Kennedy advocating reforms to capitalism to ensure full employment: "If we fail in this, Communism will triumph, not by war or even by subversion but by seemingly to be a better way of bringing people material comforts".

Macmillan was scheduled to visit the United States in April 1961, but with the Pathet Lao winning a series of victories in the Laotian Civil War, Macmillan was summoned on what he called the "Laos dash" for an emergency summit with Kennedy in Key West on 26 March 1961. Macmillan was strongly opposed to the idea of sending British troops to fight in Laos, but was afraid of damaging relations with the United States if he did not, making him very apprehensive as he set out for Key West, especially as he had never met Kennedy before. Macmillan was especially opposed to intervention in Laos as he had been warned by his Chiefs of Staff on 4 January 1961 that if Western troops entered Laos, then China would probably intervene in Laos as Mao Zedong had made it quite clear he would not accept Western forces in any nation that bordered China.

The same report stated that a war with China in Laos would "be a bottomless pit in which our limited military resources would rapidly disappear". Kennedy for his part wanted Britain to commit forces to Laos if the United States did for political reasons. The meeting in Key West was very tense as Macmillan was heard to mutter "He's pushing me hard, but I won't give way". Macmillan did reluctantly agree if the Americans intervened in Laos, then so too would Britain. The Laos crisis had a major crisis in Anglo-Thai relations as the Thais pressed for armed forces of all SEATO members to brought to "Charter Yellow", a state of heightened alert that the British representative to SEATO vetoed. The Thais wanted to change the voting procedure for SEATO from requiring unanimous consent to a three-quarter majority, a measure that Britain vetoed, causing the Thais to lose interest in SEATO.

The failure of the Bay of Pigs invasion in April 1961 made Kennedy distrust the hawkish advice he received from the Joint Chiefs of Staff and the CIA, and he ultimately decided against intervention in Laos, much to Macmillan's private relief. Macmillan's second meeting with Kennedy in April 1961 was friendlier and his third meeting in London in June 1961 after Kennedy had been bested by Khrushchev at a summit in Vienna even more so. It was at his third meeting in London that Macmillan started to assume the mantle of an elder statesman, who offered Kennedy encouragement and his experience that formed a lasting friendship. Believing that personal diplomacy was the best way to influence Kennedy, Macmillan appointed David Ormsby-Gore as his ambassador in Washington as he was a long-time friend of the Kennedy family, whom he had known since the 1930s when Kennedy's father had served as the American ambassador in London.

He was supportive throughout the Cuban Missile Crisis of 1962 and Kennedy consulted him by telephone every day. The Ambassador David Ormsby-Gore was a close family friend of the president and involved in White House discussions on how to resolve the crisis. About the Congo crisis, Macmillan clashed with Kennedy as he was against having United Nations forces put an end to the secessionist regime of Katanga backed by Belgium and the Western mining companies, which he claimed would destabilise the Central African Federation. By contrast, Kennedy felt that the regime of Katanga was a Belgian puppet state and its mere existence was damaging to the prestige of the West in the Third World. Over Macmillan's objections, Kennedy decided to have the United Nations forces to evict the white mercenaries from Katanga and reintegrate Katanga into the Congo. For his part, Kennedy pressed Macmillan unsuccessfully to have Britain join the American economic embargo against Cuba. Macmillan told his Foreign Secretary, Lord Home "there is no reason for us to help the Americans with Cuba".

Macmillan was a supporter of the nuclear test ban treaty of 1963, and in the first half of 1963 he had Ormsby-Gore quietly apply pressure on Kennedy to resume the talks in the spring of 1963 when negotiations became stalled. Feeling that the Secretary of State, Dean Rusk, was being obstructionist, Macmillan telephoned Kennedy on 11 April 1963 to suggest a joint letter to Khrushchev to break the impasse. Though Khrushchev's reply to the Macmillan-Kennedy letter was mostly negative, Macmillan pressed Kennedy to take up the one positive aspect in his reply, namely that if a senior Anglo-American team would arrive in Moscow, he would welcome them to discuss how best to proceed about a nuclear test ban treaty. The two envoys who arrived in Moscow were W. Averell Harriman representing the United States and Lord Hailsham representing the United Kingdom. Though Lord Hailsham's role was largely that of an observer, the talks between Harriman and the Soviet foreign minister Andrei Gromyko resulted in the breakthrough that led to the Partial Nuclear Test Ban Treaty of August 1963, banning all above ground nuclear tests.

Macmillan had pressing domestic reasons for the nuclear test ban treaty. Newsreel footage of Soviet and American nuclear tests throughout the 1950s had terrified segments of the British public who were highly concerned about the possibility of weapons with such destructive power being used against British cities, and this led to the foundation of the Campaign for Nuclear Disarmament (CND), whose rallies in the late 1950s-early 1960s calling for British nuclear disarmament were well attended. Macmillan believed in the value of nuclear weapons both as a deterrent against the Soviet Union and to maintain Britain's claim to be a great power, but he was also worried about the popularity of the CND. For Macmillan, banning above-ground nuclear tests, which generated film footage of the ominous mushroom clouds raising far above the earth, was the best way to dent the appeal of the CND, and in this the Partial Nuclear Ban Treaty of 1963 was successful.

===== Wind of Change =====
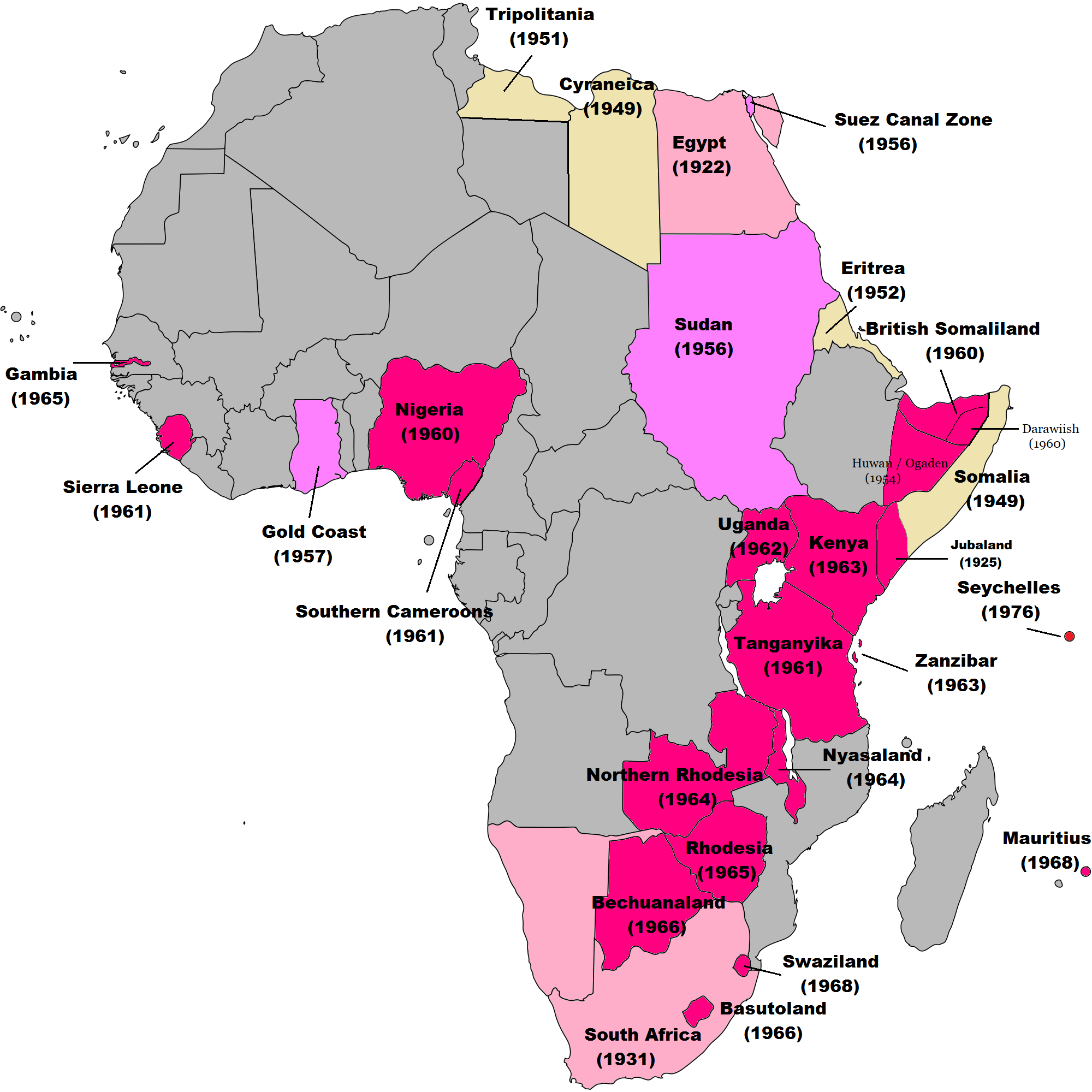
British decolonisation in Africa

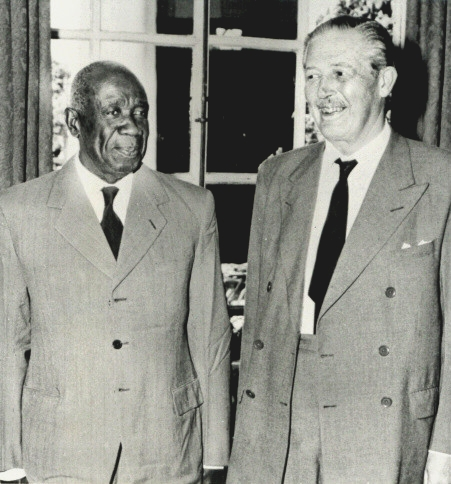
Macmillan meets Litunga of the Barotse in Northern Rhodesia, 1960

Macmillan's first government had seen the first phase of the sub-Saharan African independence movement, which accelerated under his second government. The most problematic of the colonies was the Central African Federation, which had united Northern Rhodesia, Southern Rhodesia and Nyasaland together in 1953 largely out of the fear that the white population of Southern Rhodesia (modern Zimbabwe) might want to join South Africa, which had since 1948 had been led by Afrikaner nationalists distinctly unfriendly to Britain. Though the Central African Federation had been presented as a multi-racial attempt to develop the region, the federation had been unstable right from the start with the black population charging that the whites had been given a privileged position.

Macmillan felt that if the costs of holding onto a particular territory outweighed the benefits then it should be dispensed with. During the Kenyan Emergency, the British authorities tried to protect the Kikuyu population from the Mau Mau guerrillas (who called themselves the "Land and Freedom Army") by interning the Kikuyu in camps. A scandal erupted when the guards at the Hola camp committed the Hola massacre in which they publicly beat 11 prisoners to death on 3 March 1959, which attracted much adverse publicity as the news filtered out from Kenya to the United Kingdom. Many in the British media compared the living conditions in the Kenyan camps to the concentration camps of Nazi Germany, saying that the people in the camps were emaciated and sickly. The report of the Devlin Commission in July 1959 concerning the suppression of demonstrators in Nyasaland (modern-day Malawi) called Nyasaland "a police state".

In the aftermath of criticism about colonial policies in Kenya and Nyasland, Macmillan from 1959 onward started to see the African colonies as a liability, arguing at cabinet meetings that the level of force required to hang onto them would result in more domestic criticism, international opprobrium, costly wars, and would allow the Soviet Union to establish influence in the Third World by supporting self-styled "liberation" movements that would just make things worse. After securing a third term for the Conservatives in 1959 he appointed Iain Macleod as Colonial Secretary. Macleod greatly accelerated decolonisation and by the time he was moved to Conservative Party chairman and Leader of the Commons in 1961 he had made the decision to give independence to Nigeria, Tanganyika, Kenya, Nyasaland (as Malawi) and Northern Rhodesia (as Zambia). Macmillan embarked on his "Wind of Change" tour of Africa, starting in Ghana on 6 January 1960. He made the famous 'wind of change' speech in Cape Town on 3 February 1960. It is considered a landmark in the process of decolonisation.

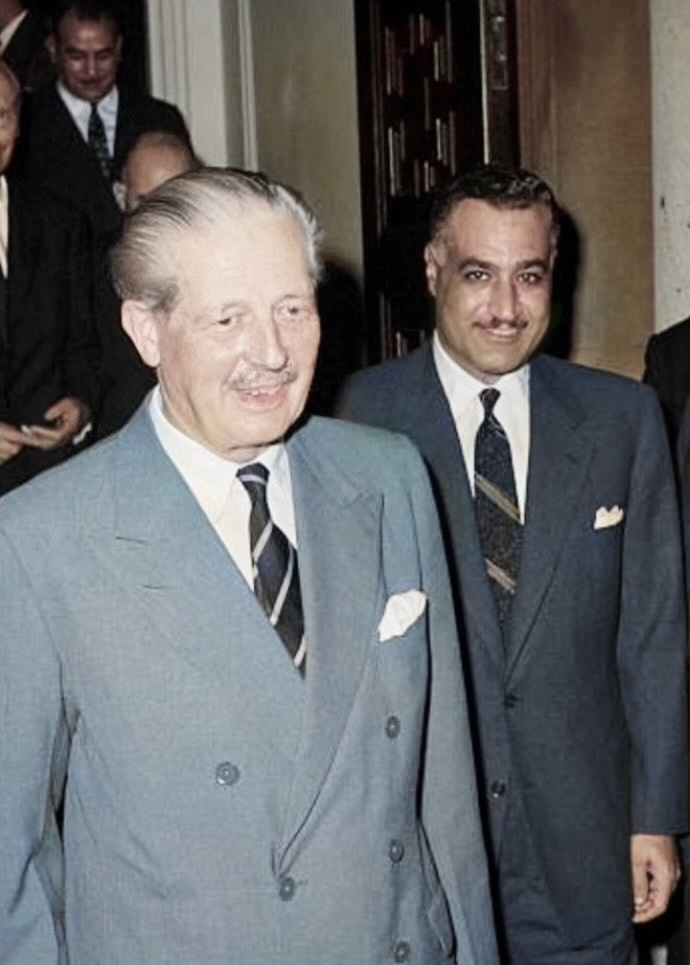
Macmillan meets Egypt 's President Gamal Abdel Nasser on the sidelines of United Nations General Assembly, 1960

Nigeria, the Southern Cameroons and British Somaliland were granted independence in 1960, Sierra Leone and Tanganyika in 1961, Trinidad and Tobago and Uganda in 1962, and Kenya in 1963. Zanzibar merged with Tanganyika to form Tanzania in 1963. All remained within the Commonwealth except British Somaliland, which merged with Italian Somaliland to form Somalia. Macmillan's policy overrode the hostility of white minorities and the Conservative Monday Club. South Africa left the multiracial Commonwealth in 1961 and Macmillan acquiesced to the dissolution of the Central African Federation by the end of 1963. In Southeast Asia, Malaya (which had gained independence on its own in 1957), Sabah (British North Borneo), Sarawak and Singapore formed a new independent nation of Malaysia in 1963. Because Singapore with its ethnic Chinese majority was the largest and wealthiest city in the region, Macmillan was afraid that a federation of Malaya and Singapore together would result in a Chinese majority state, and insisted on including Sarawak and British North Borneo into the federation of Malaysia to ensure the new state was a Malay majority state.

During the Malaya Emergency, the majority of the Communist guerrillas were ethnic Chinese, and British policies tended to favour the Muslim Malays whose willingness to follow their sultans and imams made them more anti-communist. Southeast Asia was a region where racial-ethno-religious politics predominated, and the substantial Chinese minorities in the region were widely disliked on the account of their greater economic success. Macmillan wanted Britain to retain military bases in the new state of Malaysia to ensure that Britain was a military power in Asia and thus he wanted the new state of Malaysia to have a pro-Western government. This aim was best achieved by having the same Malay elite who had worked with the British colonial authorities serve as the new elite in Malaysia, hence Macmillan's desire to have a Malay majority who would vote for Malay politicians. Macmillan especially wanted to keep the British base at Singapore, which he like other prime ministers saw as the linchpin of British power in Asia.

The Indonesian president Sukarno strongly objected to the new federation. On 8 December 1962, Indonesia sponsored a rebellion in the British protectorate of Brunei, leading to Macmillan to dispatch Gurkhas to put down the rebellion against the sultan. In January 1963 Sukarno started a policy of konfrontasi ("confrontation") with Britain. Macmillan detested Sukarno, partly because he had been a Japanese collaborator in World War Two, and partly because of his fondness for elaborate uniforms despite never having personally fought in a war offended the World War I veteran Macmillan, who had a strong contempt for any man who had not seen combat. In his diary, Macmillan called Sukarno "a cross between Liberace and Little Lord Fauntleroy". Macmillan felt that giving in to Sukarno's demands would be "appeasement" and clashed with Kennedy over the issue.

Sukarno was the leader of the most populous nation in Southeast Asia and though officially neutral in the Cold War, tended to take anti-Western positions, and Kennedy favoured accommodating him to bring him closer to the West; for example, supporting Indonesia's claim to Dutch New Guinea even through the Netherlands was a NATO ally. Macmillan feared the expenses of an all-out war with Indonesia, but also felt to give in to Sukarno would damage British prestige, writing on 5 August 1963 that Britain's position in Asia would be "untenable" if Sukarno were to triumph over Britain in the same manner he had over the Dutch in New Guinea. To help reduce the expenses of the war, Macmillan appealed to the Australian Prime Minister Sir Robert Menzies to send troops to defend Malaysia. On 25 September 1963, Sukarno announced in a speech that Indonesia would "ganyang Malaysia" ("gobble Malaysia raw") and on the same day a mob burned down the British embassy in Jakarta. The result was the Indonesian Confrontation, an undeclared war between Britain vs. Indonesia that began in 1963 and continued to 1966.

The speedy transfer of power maintained the goodwill of the new nations, but critics contended it was premature. In justification Macmillan quoted Lord Macaulay in 1851,

Many politicians of our time are in the habit of laying it down as a self-evident proposition that no people ought to be free until they are fit to use their freedom. The maxim is worthy of the fool in the old story, who resolved not to go into the water until he had learnt to swim. If men are to wait for liberty until they become wise and good in slavery, they may indeed wait for ever.

==== Skybolt crisis ====
Macmillan and John F. Kennedy confer in 1961

Macmillan cancelled the Blue Streak ballistic missile in April 1960 over concerns about its vulnerability to a pre-emptive attack, but continued with the development of the air-launched Blue Steel stand-off missile, which was about to enter trials. For the replacement for Blue Steel he opted for Britain to join the American Skybolt missile project. From the same year Macmillan permitted the US Navy to station Polaris submarines at Holy Loch, Scotland, as a replacement for Thor. When Skybolt was unilaterally cancelled by US Secretary of Defense Robert McNamara, Macmillan negotiated with President Kennedy the purchase of Polaris missiles under the Nassau agreement in December 1962.

==== Europe ====
Macmillan worked with states outside the European Communities (EC) to form the European Free Trade Association (EFTA), which from 3 May 1960 established a free-trade area. As the EC proved to be an economic success, membership of the EC started to look more attractive compared to the EFTA. A report from Sir Frank Lee of the Treasury in April 1960 predicted that the three major power blocs in the decades to come would be those headed by the United States, the Soviet Union and the EC, and argued to avoid isolation Britain would to have decisively associate itself with one of the power blocs. Macmillan wrote in his diary about his decision to apply to join the EC: "Shall we be caught between a hostile (or at least less and less friendly) America and a boastful, powerful 'Empire of Charlemagne'-now under French, but later bound to come under German control?...It's a grim choice".

Through Macmillan had decided upon joining the EC in 1960, he waited until July 1961 to formally make the application, for he feared the reaction of the Conservative Party backbenchers, the farmers' lobby and the populist newspaper chain owned by the right-wing Canadian millionaire Lord Beaverbrook, who saw Britain joining the EC as a betrayal of the British empire. As expected, the Beaverbrook newspapers whose readers tended to vote Conservative offered up ferocious criticism of Macmillan's application to join the EC, accusing him of betrayal. Negotiations to join the EC were complicated by Macmillan's desire to allow Britain to continue its traditional policy of importing food from the Commonwealth nations of Australia, New Zealand and Canada, which led the EC nations, especially France, to accuse Britain of negotiating in bad faith.

Macmillan also saw the value of rapprochement with the EC, to which his government sought belated entry, but Britain's application was vetoed by French president Charles de Gaulle on 29 January 1963. De Gaulle was always strongly opposed to British entry for many reasons. He sensed the British were inevitably closely linked to the Americans. He saw the European Communities as a continental arrangement primarily between France and Germany, and felt that if Britain joined, France's role would diminish.

==== Partial Test Ban Treaty (1963) ====
Macmillan's previous attempt to create an agreement at the May 1960 summit in Paris had collapsed due to the 1960 U-2 incident. He was a force in the negotiations leading to the signing of the 1963 Partial Test Ban Treaty by the United Kingdom, the United States and the Soviet Union. He sent Lord Hailsham to negotiate the Test Ban Treaty, a sign that he was grooming him as a potential successor. Kennedy visited Macmillan's country home, Birch Grove, on 29–30 June 1963, for talks about the planned Multilateral Force. They never met again, and this was to be Kennedy's last visit to the UK. He was assassinated in November, shortly after the end of Macmillan's premiership.

=== End of premiership ===
By the early 1960s, many were starting to find Macmillan's courtly and urbane Edwardian manners anachronistic, and satirical journals such as Private Eye and the television show That Was the Week That Was mercilessly mocked him as a doddering, clueless leader. Macmillan's handling of the Vassall affair – in which an Admiralty clerk, John Vassall, was convicted in October 1962 of passing secrets to the Soviet Union – undermined his "Super-Mac" reputation for competence. D. R. Thorpe writes that from January 1963 "Macmillan's strategy lay in ruins", leaving him looking for a "graceful exit". The Vassall affair turned the press against him. In the same month, opposition leader Hugh Gaitskell died suddenly at the age of 56. With a general election due before the end of the following year, Gaitskell's death threw the future of British politics into fresh doubt. The following month Harold Wilson was elected as the new Labour leader, and he proved to be a popular choice with the public.

==== Profumo affair ====
The Profumo affair of 1963 permanently damaged the credibility of Macmillan's government. The revelation of the affair between John Profumo (Secretary of State for War) and an alleged call-girl, Christine Keeler, who was simultaneously sleeping with the Soviet naval attache Captain Yevgeny Ivanov made it appear that Macmillan had lost control of his government and of events in general. In the ensuing Parliamentary debate he was seen as a pathetic figure, while Nigel Birch declared, in the words of Browning on Wordsworth, that it would be "Never glad confident morning again!" On 17 June 1963, he survived a Parliamentary vote with a majority of 69, one fewer than had been thought necessary for his survival, and was afterwards joined in the smoking room only by his son and son-in-law, not by any Cabinet minister. However, Butler and Reginald Maudling (who was very popular with backbench MPs at that time) declined to push for his resignation, especially after a tide of support from Conservative activists around the country. Many of the salacious revelations about the sex lives of "Establishment" figures during the Profumo affair damaged the image of "the Establishment" that Macmillan was seen as a part of, giving him the image by 1963 of a "failing representative of a decadent elite".

==== Resignation ====
By the summer of 1963 Conservative Party Chairman Lord Poole was urging the ageing Macmillan to retire. The full Denning report into the Profumo Scandal was published on 26 September 1963.

Macmillan had a meeting with Butler on 11 September and was careful to keep his options open (retire now, retire in the New Year, or fight the next election). He talked the matter over with his son Maurice and other senior ministers. Over lunch with Lord Swinton on 30 September he favoured stepping down, but only if Viscount Hailsham could be shoehorned in as his successor. He saw Butler on the morning of 7 October and told him he planned to stay on to lead the Conservatives into the next General Election, then was struck down by prostate problems on the night of 7–8 October, on the eve of the Conservative Party conference.

Macmillan was operated on at 11:30 am on 10 October. Although it is sometimes stated that he believed himself to have inoperable prostate cancer, he in fact knew it was benign before the operation. Macmillan was almost ready to leave hospital within ten days of the diagnosis and could easily have carried on, in the opinion of his doctor Sir John Richardson. His illness gave him a way out.

==== Succession ====
While recovering in hospital, Macmillan wrote a memorandum (dated 14 October) recommending the process by which "soundings" would be taken of party opinion to select his successor, which was accepted by the Cabinet on 15 October. This time backbench MPs and junior ministers were to be asked their opinion, rather than just the Cabinet as in 1957, and efforts would be made to sample opinion amongst peers and constituency activists.

Enoch Powell claimed that it was wrong of Macmillan to seek to monopolise the advice given to the Queen in this way. In fact, this was done at the Palace's request, so that Queen Elizabeth II was not being seen to be involved in politics as had happened in January 1957, and had been decided as far back as June when it had looked as though the government might fall over the Profumo scandal. Ben Pimlott later described this as the "biggest political misjudgement of her reign".

Macmillan was succeeded by Foreign Secretary Alec Douglas-Home in a controversial move; it was alleged that Macmillan had pulled strings and utilised the party's grandees, nicknamed "The Magic Circle", who had slanted their "soundings" of opinion among MPs and Cabinet Ministers to ensure that Butler was (once again) not chosen.

He finally resigned, receiving Queen Elizabeth II from his hospital bed, on 18 October 1963, after nearly seven years as prime minister. He felt privately that he was being hounded from office by a backbench minority:

Some few will be content with the success they have had in the assassination of their leader and will not care very much who the successor is. ... They are a band that in the end does not amount to more than 15 or 20 at the most.

== Retirement, 1963–1986 ==
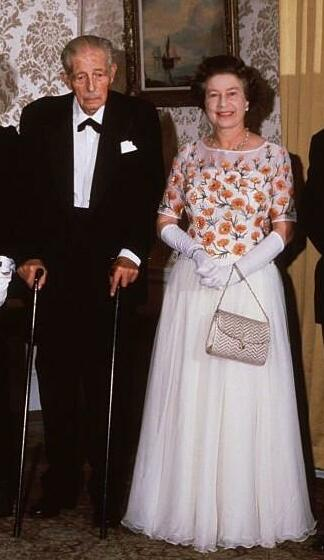
Macmillan with Queen Elizabeth II in 1985

Macmillan initially refused a peerage and retired from politics in September 1964, standing down at the following month's election, which the Conservatives narrowly lost to Labour, now led by Harold Wilson. His service in the House of Commons totalled 37 years.

=== Oxford chancellor (1960–1986) ===
Macmillan had been elected Chancellor of the University of Oxford in 1960, in a campaign masterminded by Hugh Trevor-Roper, and held this office for the rest of his life, frequently presiding over college events, making speeches and tirelessly raising funds. According to Sir Patrick Neill QC, the vice-chancellor, Macmillan "would talk late into the night with eager groups of students who were often startled by the radical views he put forward, well into his last decade."

=== Return to Macmillan Publishers ===
In retirement Macmillan took up the chairmanship of his family's publishing house, Macmillan Publishers, from 1964 to 1974. The publishing firm remained in family hands until a majority share was purchased in 1995 by the Holtzbrinck Publishing Group; the imprint persists. Macmillan brought out a six-volume autobiography:

1. Winds of Change, 1914–1939 (1966) ISBN 0-333-06639-1
2. The Blast of War, 1939–1945 (1967) ISBN 0-333-00358-6
3. Tides of Fortune, 1945–1955 (1969) ISBN 0-333-04077-5
4. Riding the Storm, 1956–1959 (1971) ISBN 0-333-10310-6
5. Pointing the Way, 1959–1961 (1972) ISBN 0-333-12411-1
6. At the End of the Day, 1961–1963 (1973) ISBN 0-333-12413-8

Macmillan's biographer acknowledges that his memoirs were considered "heavy going". Reading these volumes was said by Macmillan's political enemy Enoch Powell to induce "a sensation akin to that of chewing on cardboard". Butler wrote in his review of Riding the Storm: "Altogether this massive work will keep anybody busy for several weeks."

Macmillan's wartime diaries were better received.

- War Diaries: Politics and War in the Mediterranean, January 1943 – May 1945 (London: Macmillan, 1984) ISBN 0-333-37198-4

Since Macmillan's death, his diaries for the 1950s and 1960s have also been published, both edited by Peter Catterall:

- The Macmillan Diaries: The Cabinet Years 1950–57 (London: Macmillan, 2003) ISBN 0-333-71167-X
- The Macmillan Diaries Vol II: Prime Minister and After 1957–1966 (London: Macmillan, 2011) ISBN 1-405-04721-6

Macmillan burned his diary for the climax of the Suez Affair, supposedly at Eden's request, although in Campbell's view more likely to protect his own reputation.

=== London clubs ===
Macmillan was a member of many clubs. On his first evening as prime minister he made a public show of taking the Chief Whip Edward Heath for oysters at the Turf Club.

He became president of the Carlton Club in 1977 and would often stay at the club when he had to stay in London overnight. Within a few months of becoming president, he merged the Carlton and Junior Carlton. He was also a member of Buck's, Pratt's, the Turf Club and Beefsteak Club. He also once commented that White's was 75% gentlemen and 25% crooks, the perfect combination for a club.

=== Political interventions ===
Macmillan made occasional political interventions in retirement. Responding to a remark made by Labour Prime Minister Harold Wilson about not having boots in which to go to school, Macmillan retorted: 'If Mr Wilson did not have boots to go to school that is because he was too big for them.'

Macmillan accepted the Order of Merit in 1976. In October of that year he called for "a Government of National Unity" including all parties, which could command the public support to resolve the economic crisis. Asked who could lead such a coalition, he replied: "Mr Gladstone formed his last Government when he was eighty-three. I'm only eighty-two. You mustn't put temptation in my way." He discussed the idea with Eden, but the IMF loan saved the country and the Labour government.

Macmillan still travelled widely, visiting China in October 1979, where he held talks with senior Vice-Premier Deng Xiaoping.

=== Relations with Margaret Thatcher ===
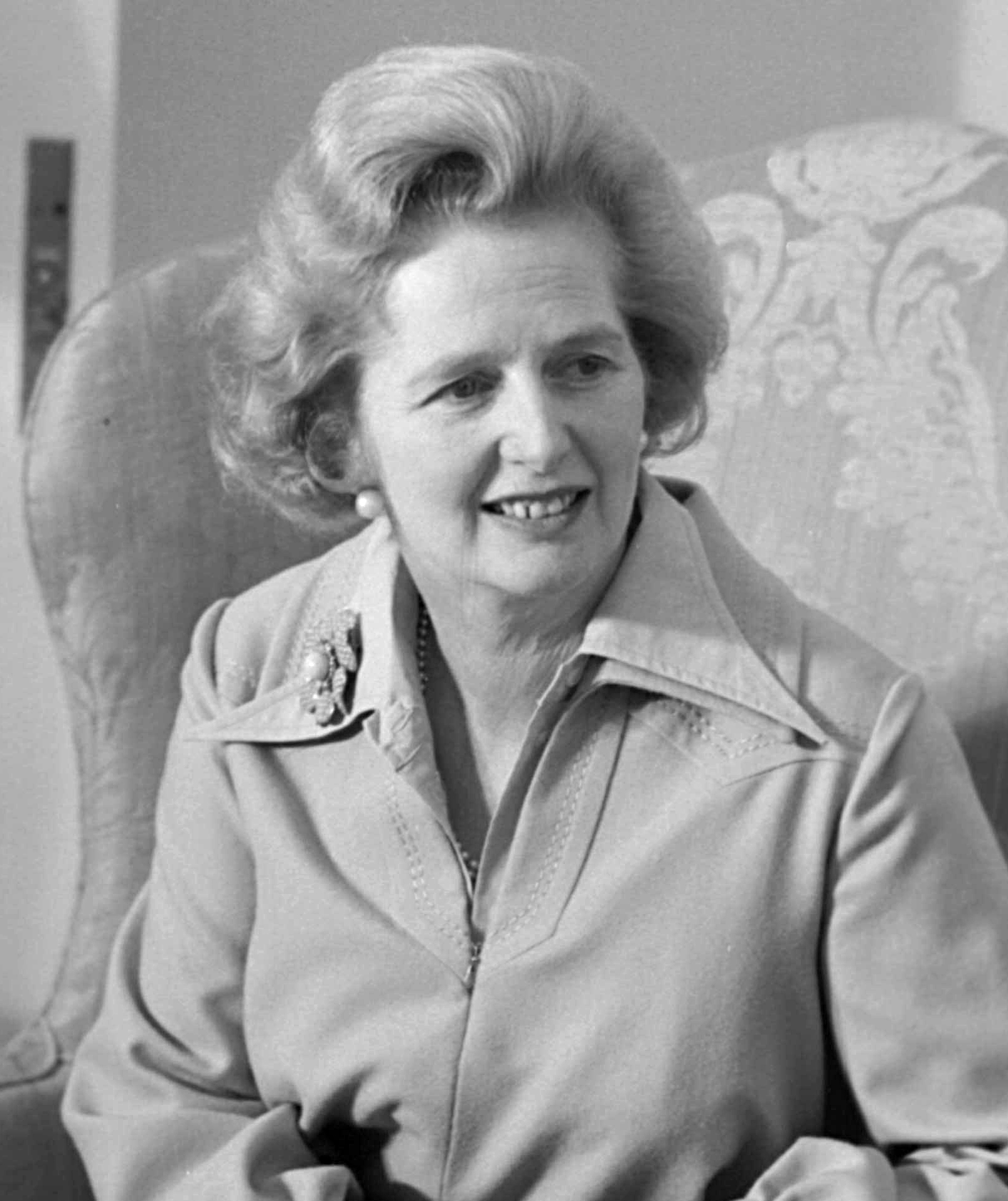
Macmillan became critical of Margaret Thatcher (pictured in 1975)

Macmillan found himself drawn more actively into politics after Margaret Thatcher became Conservative leader in February 1975. After she became prime minister in May 1979, he told Nigel Fisher (his biographer, and himself a Conservative MP): "Ted [Heath] was a very good No2 {pause} not a leader {pause}. Now, you have a real leader. {long pause} Whether she's leading you in the right direction ..."

The record of Macmillan's own premiership came under attack from the monetarists in the party, whose theories Thatcher supported. In a celebrated speech he wondered aloud where such theories had come from:

Was it America? Or was it Tibet? It is quite true, many of Your Lordships will remember it operating in the nursery. How do you treat a cold? One nanny said, 'Feed a cold'; she was a neo-Keynesian. The other said, 'Starve a cold'; she was a monetarist.

Macmillan was one of several people who advised Thatcher to set up a small War Cabinet to manage the Falklands War. On his advice she excluded the Treasury from this body. Having first inquired whether Argentina was known to have atomic weapons, Macmillan's advice was to appoint a senior military advisor, as Pug Ismay had been in the Second World War (in the event Admiral Lewin, Chief of Defence Staff, performed this role). She had already received advice to exclude the Treasury from Frank Cooper (the Permanent Under-Secretary for Defence), not least because of Macmillan's own behaviour, as Chancellor, in demanding a halt to the Suez operation. She later recalled: 'I never regretted following Harold Macmillan's advice. We were never tempted to compromise the security of our forces for financial reasons. Everything we did was governed by military necessity.'

With hereditary peerages again being created under Thatcher, Macmillan requested the earldom that had been customarily bestowed to departing prime ministers, and on 24 February 1984 he was created Earl of Stockton and Viscount Macmillan of Ovenden. He is the last non-royal recipient of a hereditary peerage. He took the title from his former parliamentary seat on the edge of the Durham coalfields, and in his maiden speech in the House of Lords in November 1984 he criticised Thatcher's handling of the coal miners' strike. He received an unprecedented standing ovation for his oration, which included the words:

It breaks my heart to see — and I cannot interfere — what is happening in our country today. This terrible strike, by the best men in the world, who beat the Kaiser's and Hitler's armies and never gave in. It is pointless and we cannot afford that kind of thing. Then there is the growing division of comparative prosperity in the south and an ailing north and Midlands. We used to have battles and rows but they were quarrels. Now there is a new kind of wicked hatred that has been brought in by different types of people.

As Chancellor of the University of Oxford, Macmillan condemned its refusal in February 1985 to award Thatcher an honorary degree. He noted that the decision represented a break with tradition, and predicted that the snub would rebound to the university.

Macmillan is widely supposed to have likened Thatcher's policy of privatisation to "selling the family silver". His precise quotation, at a dinner of the Tory Reform Group at the Royal Overseas League on 8 November 1985, was on the subject of the sale of assets commonplace among individuals or states when they encountered financial difficulties: "First of all the Georgian silver goes. And then all that nice furniture that used to be in the salon. Then the Canalettos go." Profitable parts of the steel industry and the railways had been privatised, along with British Telecom: "They were like two Rembrandts still left."

Macmillan's speech was much commented on, and a few days later he made a speech in the House of Lords, referring to it:

When I ventured the other day to criticise the system I was, I am afraid, misunderstood. As a Conservative, I am naturally in favour of returning into private ownership and private management all those means of production and distribution which are now controlled by state capitalism. I am sure they will be more efficient. What I ventured to question was the using of these huge sums as if they were income.

== Death and funeral ==
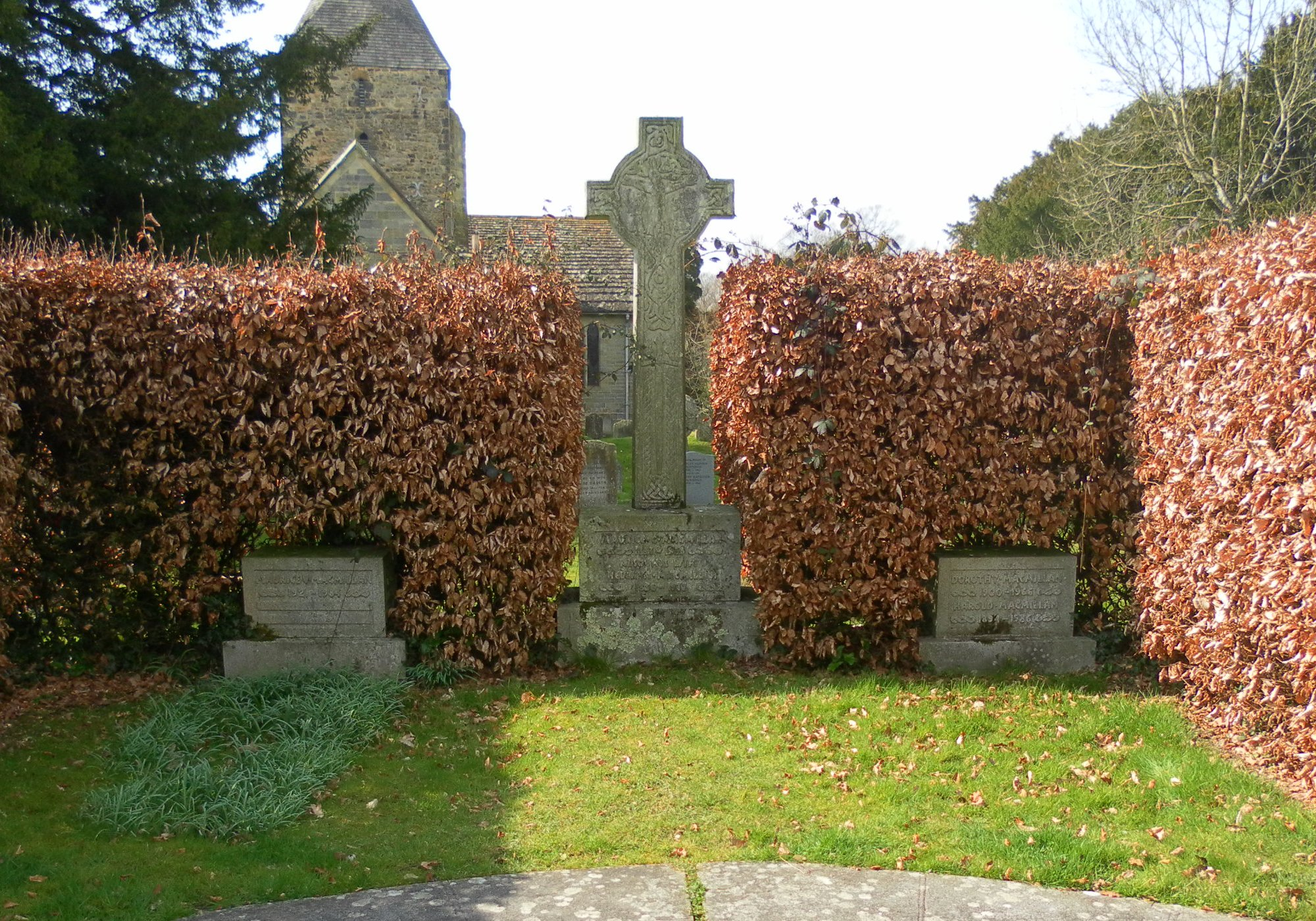
The Macmillan family graves in 2012 at St Giles' Church, Horsted Keynes. Macmillan's grave is on the right.

Macmillan had often play-acted being an old man long before real old age set in. As early as 1948 Humphry Berkeley wrote of how "he makes a show of being feeble and decrepit", mentioning how he had suddenly stopped shambling and sprinted for a train. Nigel Fisher tells an anecdote of how Macmillan initially greeted him to his house leaning on a stick, but later walked and climbed steps perfectly well, twice acting lame again and fetching his stick when he remembered his "act". However, in genuine old age he became almost blind, causing him to need sticks and a helping arm.

On the evening of 29 December 1986, Macmillan died at Birch Grove, the Macmillan family mansion on the edge of Ashdown Forest, in Horsted Keynes, West Sussex. His grandson and heir Alexander, said: "In the last 48 hours he was very weak but entirely reasonable and intelligent. His last words were, 'I think I will go to sleep now'." His lifespan of 92 years and 322 days was the longest of any British prime minister until surpassed by James Callaghan on 14 February 2005.

Paying tribute, Thatcher hailed Macmillan as "a very remarkable man and a very great patriot", and said that his dislike of "selling the family silver" had never come between them. He was "unique in the affection of the British people". Additional tributes came from around the world. US President Ronald Reagan said: "The American people share in the loss of a voice of wisdom and humanity who, with eloquence and gentle wit, brought to the problems of today the experience of a long life of public service." Outlawed African National Congress president Oliver Tambo sent his condolences: 'As South Africans we shall always remember him for his efforts to encourage the apartheid regime to bow to the winds of change that continue to blow in South Africa.' Commonwealth Secretary-General Sir Shridath Ramphal affirmed: "His own leadership in providing from Britain a worthy response to African national consciousness shaped the post-war era and made the modern Commonwealth possible."

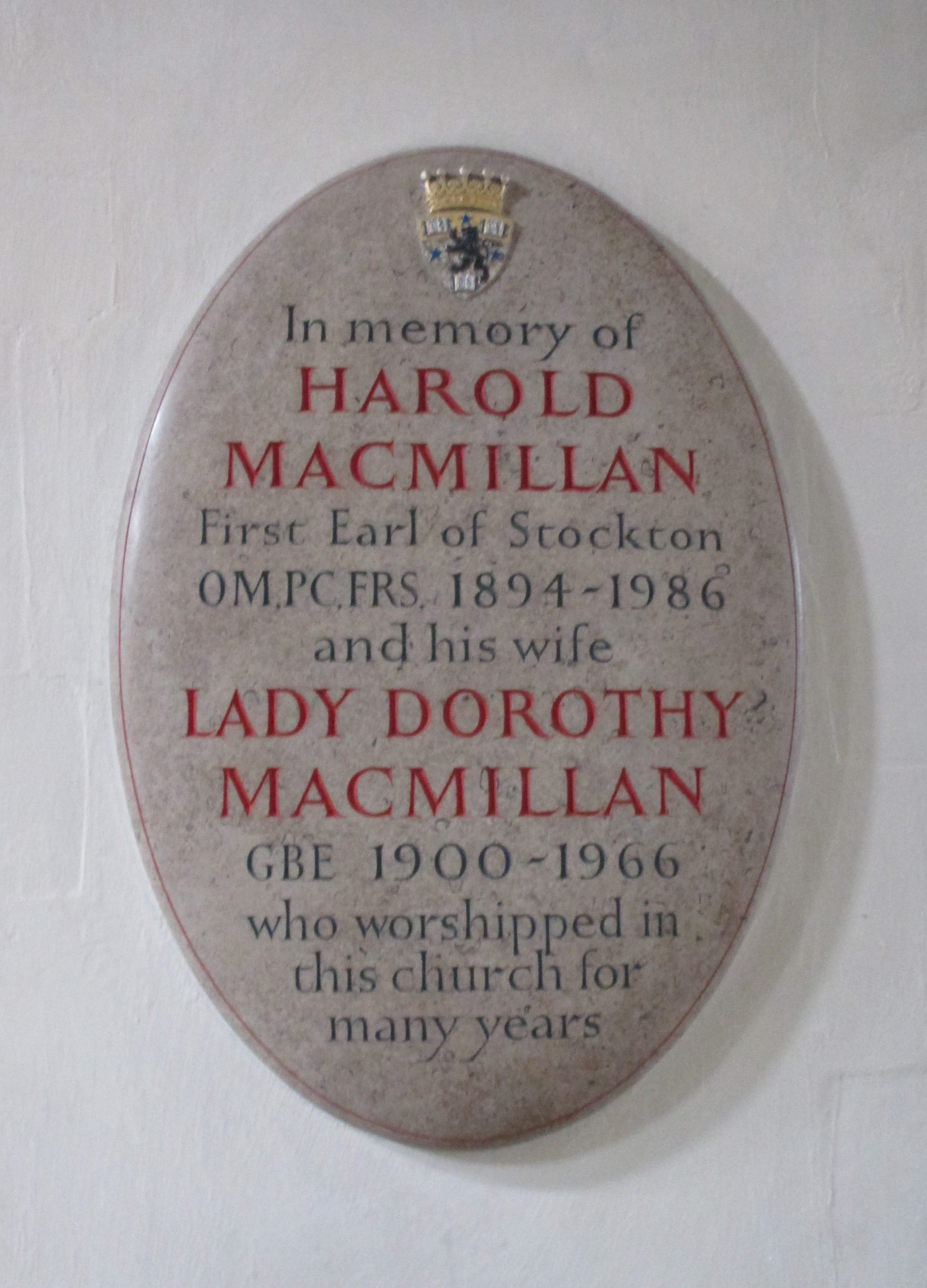
Memorial tablet in St Giles' Church, Horsted Keynes

A private funeral was held on 5 January 1987 at St Giles' Church, Horsted Keynes, West Sussex, where he had regularly worshipped and read the lesson. Two hundred mourners attended, including 64 members of the Macmillan family, Thatcher and former premiers Lord Home and Edward Heath, as well as Lord Hailsham, and "scores of country neighbours". The Prince of Wales sent a wreath "in admiring memory". He was buried beside his wife and next to his parents and his son Maurice, who had died in 1984.

The House of Commons paid its tribute on 12 January 1987, with much reference made to his book The Middle Way. Thatcher said: "In his retirement Harold Macmillan occupied a unique place in the nation's affections", while Labour leader Neil Kinnock struck a more critical note:

Death and distance cannot lend sufficient enchantment to alter the view that the period over which he presided in the 1950s, while certainly and thankfully a period of rising affluence and confidence, was also a time of opportunities missed, of changes avoided. Harold Macmillan was, of course, not solely or even pre-eminently responsible for that. But we cannot but record with frustration the fact that the vigorous and perceptive attacker of the status quo in the 1930s became its emblem for a time in the late 1950s before returning to be its critic in the 1980s.

A public memorial service, attended by Queen Elizabeth II and thousands of mourners, was held on 10 February 1987 in Westminster Abbey. Macmillan's estate was assessed for probate on 1 June 1987, with a value of £51,114 (equivalent to £147,854 in 2025).

== Honours, awards and legacy ==
Macmillan was an elected Fellow of the Royal Society (FRS) in 1962.

In 1976 he received the Order of Merit. In 1984 he received the Freedom medal from the Roosevelt Study Center.

Macmillan's archives are located at the University of Oxford's Bodleian Library.

Macmillan was awarded a number of honorary degrees, including:

- 1956 – Indiana University
- 1958 – DePauw University
- 1958 – Johns Hopkins University, together with Eisenhower
- 1961 – University of Cambridge

=== Historians' assessments of Macmillan's premiership ===
C. P. Snow wrote to Macmillan that his reputation would endure as, like Churchill, he was "psychologically interesting".

An early biographer George Hutchinson called him "The Last Edwardian at Number Ten" (1980), mistakenly in the view of Nigel Fisher. Fisher described him as "complex, almost chameleon". At times he portrayed himself as the descendant of a Scottish crofter, as a businessman, aristocrat, intellectual and soldier. Labour leader Harold Wilson wrote that his "role as a poseur was itself a pose". Wilson also argued that behind the public nonchalance lay a real professional. Fisher also wrote that he "had a talent for pursuing progressive policies but presenting them tactfully in a Conservative tone of voice".

Historian John Vincent explores the image Macmillan crafted of himself for his colleagues and constituents:

He presented himself as a patrician, as the last Edwardian, as a Whig (in the tradition of his wife's family), as a romantic Tory, as intellectual, as a man shaped by the comradeship of the trenches and by the slump of the 1930s, as a shrewd man of business of bourgeois Scottish stock, and as a venerable elder statesman at home with modern youth. There was something in all these views, which he did little to discourage, and which commanded public respect into the early 1960s. Whether he was ever a mainstream Conservative, rather than a skilful exponent of the postwar consensus, is more doubtful.

Alistair Horne, his official biographer, concedes that after his re-election in 1959 Macmillan's premiership suffered a series of major setbacks.

Campbell writes that: "a late developer who languished on the back benches ... in the 1930s, Macmillan seized his opportunity when it came with flair and ruthlessness, and [until about 1962] filled the highest office with compelling style". However, he argues that Macmillan is remembered as having been "a rather seedy conjuror", famous for Premium Bonds, Beeching's cuts to the railways, and the Profumo Scandal. He is also remembered for "stop-go" economics. In the 1980s the aged Macmillan was seen as "a revered but slightly pathetic figure".

Dominic Sandbrook writes that Macmillan's final weeks were typical of his premiership, "devious, theatrical and self-seeking". Macmillan is best remembered for the "affluent society", which he inherited rather than created in the late 1950s, but chancellors came and went and by the early 1960s economic policy was "nothing short of a shambles", while his achievements in foreign policy made little difference to the lives of the public. By the time he left office, largely unlamented at the time, he was associated not with prosperity but with "anachronism and decay".

D. R. Thorpe writes that by the early 1960s Macmillan was seen as "the epitome of all that was wrong with anachronistic Britain. This was an unfair charge." "The essence of his persona was as elusive as mercury." He was not a member of "the Establishment"—in fact he was a businessman who had married into the aristocracy and a rebel Chancellor of Oxford. "He had style in abundance, (and) was a star on the world stage". Thorpe argues that despite his 1960 "Winds of Change" speech, he was largely pushed into rapid independence for African countries by Maudling and Macleod.

Richard Lamb argues that Macmillan was "by far the best of Britain's postwar Prime Ministers, and his administration performed better than any of their successors". Lamb argues that it is unfair to blame Macmillan for excessively quick African independence (resulting in many former colonies becoming dictatorships), or for the Beeching Plan (which was accepted by Labour in 1964, although Macmillan himself had reservations and had asked civil servants to draw up plans for extra road building), and argues that had he remained in power Macmillan would never have allowed inflation to get as far out of hand as it did in the 1970s.

== Arms ==
Coat of arms of Harold Macmillan, 1st Earl of Stockton
Crest Upon a helm with a wreath or azure and sable within sprigs of oak fructed or a dexter cubit arm and a sinister arm embowed both proper the dexter hand gauntletted or and with the other brandishing a two handed sword proper hilt pommel and quillons sable. Escutcheon Argent a chief or overall between three open books proper edged or and bound azure those in chief inscribed respectively in letters sable ` Miseres’ and ` Discere’ and that in base also in letters sable inscribed ` Succo’ and as many mullets azure a lion rampant sable. Supporters Dexter, a lion rampant gules; Sinister, an American bald headed eagle proper the compartment comprising a crenelated wall proper in the portal thereof an anchor azure and joined on either side by two bars wavy azure to a grassy mount growing from that on the dexter a long branch and from that on the sinister a thistle both proper.

== Cabinets (1957–1963) ==
=== January 1957 – October 1959 ===
- Harold Macmillan: Prime Minister
- Lord Kilmuir: Lord Chancellor
- Lord Salisbury: Lord President of the Council
- Rab Butler: Lord Privy Seal and Secretary of State for the Home Department
- Peter Thorneycroft: Chancellor of the Exchequer
- Selwyn Lloyd: Secretary of State for Foreign Affairs
- Alan Lennox-Boyd: Secretary of State for the Colonies
- Lord Home: Secretary of State for Commonwealth Relations
- Sir David Eccles: President of the Board of Trade
- Charles Hill: Chancellor of the Duchy of Lancaster
- Lord Hailsham: Minister of Education
- John Scott Maclay: Secretary of State for Scotland
- Derick Heathcoat Amory: Minister of Agriculture
- Iain Macleod: Minister of Labour and National Service
- Harold Arthur Watkinson: Minister of Transport and Civil Aviation
- Duncan Edwin Sandys: Minister of Defence
- Lord Mills: Minister of Power
- Henry Brooke: Minister of Housing and Local Government and Welsh Affairs

Change

- March 1957 – Lord Home succeeds Lord Salisbury as Lord President, remaining Commonwealth Relations Secretary.
- September 1957 – Lord Hailsham succeeds Lord Home as Lord President, Home remaining Commonwealth Relations Secretary. Geoffrey Lloyd succeeds Hailsham as Minister of Education. The Chief Secretary to the Treasury, Reginald Maudling, enters the Cabinet.
- January 1958 – Derick Heathcoat Amory succeeds Peter Thorneycroft as Chancellor of the Exchequer. John Hare succeeds Amory as Minister of Agriculture.

=== October 1959 – July 1960 ===
- Harold Macmillan: Prime Minister
- Lord Kilmuir: Lord Chancellor
- Lord Home: Lord President of the Council and Secretary of State for Commonwealth Relations
- Lord Hailsham: Lord Privy Seal and Minister of Science
- Derick Heathcoat Amory: Chancellor of the Exchequer
- Rab Butler: Secretary of State for the Home Department
- Selwyn Lloyd: Secretary of State for Foreign Affairs
- Iain Macleod: Secretary of State for the Colonies
- Reginald Maudling: President of the Board of Trade
- Charles Hill: Chancellor of the Duchy of Lancaster
- Sir David Eccles: Minister of Education
- Lord Mills: Chief Secretary to the Treasury
- Ernest Marples: Minister of Transport
- Duncan Edwin Sandys: Minister of Aviation
- Harold Arthur Watkinson: Minister of Defence
- John Scott Maclay: Secretary of State for Scotland
- Edward Heath: Minister of Labour and National Service
- John Hare: Minister of Agriculture
- Henry Brooke: Minister of Housing and Local Government and Welsh Affairs

=== July 1960 – October 1961 ===
- Harold Macmillan: Prime Minister
- Lord Kilmuir: Lord Chancellor
- Lord Hailsham: Lord President of the Council and Minister of Science
- Edward Heath: Lord Privy Seal
- Selwyn Lloyd: Chancellor of the Exchequer
- Rab Butler: Secretary of State for the Home Department
- Lord Home: Secretary of State for Foreign Affairs
- Iain Macleod: Secretary of State for the Colonies
- Duncan Edwin Sandys: Secretary of State for Commonwealth Relations
- Reginald Maudling: President of the Board of Trade
- Charles Hill: Chancellor of the Duchy of Lancaster
- Sir David Eccles: Minister of Education
- Lord Hailsham: Minister of Science
- Lord Mills: Chief Secretary to the Treasury
- Ernest Marples: Minister of Transport
- Peter Thorneycroft: Minister of Aviation
- Harold Arthur Watkinson: Minister of Defence
- John Scott Maclay: Secretary of State for Scotland
- John Hare: Minister of Labour and National Service
- Christopher Soames: Minister of Agriculture
- Henry Brooke: Minister of Housing and Local Government and Welsh Affairs

=== October 1961 – July 1962 ===
- Harold Macmillan: Prime Minister
- Lord Kilmuir: Lord Chancellor
- Lord Hailsham: Lord President of the Council and Minister of Science
- Edward Heath: Lord Privy Seal
- Selwyn Lloyd: Chancellor of the Exchequer
- Rab Butler: Secretary of State for the Home Department
- Alec Douglas-Home: Secretary of State for Foreign Affairs
- Reginald Maudling: Secretary of State for the Colonies
- Duncan Edwin Sandys: Secretary of State for Commonwealth Relations
- Frederick Erroll: President of the Board of Trade
- Iain Macleod: Chancellor of the Duchy of Lancaster
- Sir David Eccles: Minister of Education
- Henry Brooke: Chief Secretary to the Treasury
- Ernest Marples: Minister of Transport
- Peter Thorneycroft: Minister of Aviation
- Harold Arthur Watkinson: Minister of Defence
- John Scott Maclay: Secretary of State for Scotland
- John Hare: Minister of Labour and National Service
- Christopher Soames: Minister of Agriculture
- Charles Hill: Minister of Housing and Local Government and Welsh Affairs
- Lord Mills: Minister without Portfolio

=== July 1962 – October 1963 ===
Note: In a radical reshuffle dubbed "The Night of the Long Knives", Macmillan sacked a third of his Cabinet.

- Harold Macmillan: Prime Minister
- Rab Butler: Deputy Prime Minister and First Secretary of State
- Lord Dilhorne: Lord Chancellor
- Lord Hailsham: Lord President of the Council and Minister of Science
- Edward Heath: Lord Privy Seal
- Reginald Maudling: Chancellor of the Exchequer
- Henry Brooke: Secretary of State for the Home Department
- Alec Douglas-Home: Secretary of State for Foreign Affairs
- Duncan Edwin Sandys: Secretary of State for the Colonies and Secretary of State for Commonwealth Relations
- Frederick Erroll: President of the Board of Trade
- Iain Macleod: Chancellor of the Duchy of Lancaster
- Sir Edward Boyle: Minister of Education
- John Boyd-Carpenter: Chief Secretary to the Treasury
- Ernest Marples: Minister of Transport
- Julian Amery: Minister of Aviation
- Peter Thorneycroft: Minister of Defence
- Michael Noble: Secretary of State for Scotland
- John Hare: Minister of Labour and National Service
- Christopher Soames: Minister of Agriculture
- Sir Keith Joseph: Minister of Housing and Local Government and Welsh Affairs
- Enoch Powell: Minister of Health
- William Deedes: Minister without Portfolio

== Memoirs ==
- Winds of change 1914-1939
- The blast of war 1939-1945
- Tides of fortune 1945-1955
- Riding the storm 1956-1959
- Pointing the way 1959-1961
- At the end of the day 1961-1963

== Cited texts ==
- Ashton, Nigel J. (August 2005). "Harold Macmillan and the "Golden Days" of Anglo-American Relations Revisited, 1957–63". Diplomatic History. 29 (4): 691–723. doi:10.1111/j.1467-7709.2005.00511.x.
- Ball, Simon (2005). The Guardsmen: Harold Macmillan, Three Friends and the World They Made. London: Harper Perennial. ISBN 978-0-00-653163-0.
- Beckett, Francis (2006). Macmillan. London: Haus Publishing. ISBN 978-1-904950-66-0.
- Busch, Peter (2003). All the Way with JFK? Britain, the US, and the Vietnam War. Oxford: Oxford University Press. ISBN 9780199256396.
- Campbell, John (2010). Pistols at Dawn: Two Hundred Years of Political Rivalry from Pitt and Fox to Blair and Brown. London: Vintage. ISBN 978-1-845-95091-0. (contains an essay on Macmillan and Butler)
- Dell, Edmund (1997). The Chancellors: A History of the Chancellors of the Exchequer, 1945–90. HarperCollins. pp. 207–222.
- Fisher, Nigel (1982). Harold Macmillan. London: Weidenfeld and Nicolson. ISBN 978-0-297-77914-8.
- Goodlad, Graham; Pearce, Robert (2013). British Prime Ministers From Balfour to Brown. London: Routledge. ISBN 9780415669832.
- Hennessy, Peter (2006). Having It So Good: Britain in the Fifties. London: Penguin Books. ISBN 978-0-14-100409-9.
- Horne, Alistair (1988). Macmillan Volume I: 1894–1956 (original ed.). London: Macmillan. ISBN 978-0-333-27691-4.
- Horne, Alistair (1989). Macmillan Volume II: 1957–1986 (Original ed.). London: Macmillan. ISBN 978-0-333-49621-3.
- Horne, Alistair (2008) [1988-9]. Macmillan: The Official Biography (Twentieth anniversary ed.). London: Macmillan. ISBN 978-0-230-71083-2.
- Howard, Anthony (1987). RAB: The Life of R. A. Butler. London: Jonathan Cape. ISBN 978-0-224-01862-3.
- Lamb, Richard (1995). The Macmillan Years 1957–63: The Emerging Truth. London: Murray. ISBN 978-0-719-55392-9.
- Middleton, Roger (1997) [1996]. Government Versus the Market: Growth of the Public Sector, Economic Management and British Economic Performance, 1890–1979 (New ed.). Cheltenham: Edward Elgar Publishing. ISBN 978-1-85898-371-4.
- Moore, Charles (2013). Margaret Thatcher: From Grantham to the Falklands.
- Sandbrook, Dominic (2005). Never Had It So Good. London: Little, Brown. ISBN 978-0-349-11530-6.
- Subritzy, John (1999). "Macmillan and East of Suez: the Case of Malaysia". In Lee, Richard (ed.). Macmillan: Aspects of a Political Life. London: Macmillan. pp. 177–194. ISBN 9780230376892.
- Thorpe, D. R. (2010). Supermac: The Life of Harold Macmillan. London: Chatto & Windus. ISBN 978-0-701-17748-5 – via Internet Archive.
- Theatre Record (1997 for Hugh Whitemore's A Letter of Resignation; 2008 for Howard Brenton's Never So Good)
- Williams, Charles (2010). Harold Macmillan. London: Weidenfeld & Nicolson. ISBN 978-0-753-82702-4.
- Wright, Oliver (1999). "Macmillan: A View from the Foreign Office". In Lee, Richard (ed.). Macmillan: Aspects of a Political Life. London: Macmillan. pp. 6–15. ISBN 9780230376892.

Parliament of the United Kingdom
Preceded by Robert Strother Stewart	Member of Parliament for Stockton-on-Tees; 1924–1929	Succeeded by Frederick Fox Riley
Preceded by Frederick Fox Riley	Member of Parliament for Stockton-on-Tees; 1931–1945	Succeeded by George Chetwynd
Preceded by Sir Edward Campbell	Member of Parliament for Bromley; 1945–1964	Succeeded by John Hunt
Political offices
Preceded by John Llewellin	Parliamentary Secretary to the Ministry of Supply; 1940–1942	Succeeded by The Viscount Portal
Preceded by George Hall	Under-Secretary of State for the Colonies; 1942	Succeeded by The Duke of Devonshire
Preceded by Sir Archibald Sinclair	Secretary of State for Air; 1945	Succeeded by The Viscount Stansgate
Preceded by Hugh Dalton as Minister of Local Government and Planning	Minister of Housing and Local Government; 1951–1954	Succeeded by Duncan Sandys
Preceded by The Earl Alexander of Tunis	Minister of Defence; 1954–1955	Succeeded by Selwyn Lloyd
Preceded by Sir Anthony Eden	Foreign Secretary; 1955	Succeeded by Selwyn Lloyd
Preceded by Rab Butler	Chancellor of the Exchequer; 1955–1957	Succeeded by Peter Thorneycroft
Preceded by Sir Anthony Eden	Prime Minister of the United Kingdom; 1957–1963	Succeeded by Alec Douglas-Home
Party political offices
Preceded by Sir Anthony Eden	Leader of the Conservative Party; 1957–1963	Succeeded by Alec Douglas-Home
Diplomatic posts
New title	Minister Resident in Northwest Africa; 1942–1945	Succeeded by Harold Balfour
Academic offices
Preceded by The Earl of Halifax	Chancellor of the University of Oxford; 1960–1986	Succeeded by Roy Jenkins
Peerage of the United Kingdom
New creation	Earl of Stockton; 1984–1986; Member of the House of Lords (1984–1986)	Succeeded by Alexander Macmillan
