= Victor Weisz =

German-British political cartoonist (1913–1966)

Victor Weisz (25 April 1913 in Berlin, Germany – 23 February 1966 in London, England) was a German-British political cartoonist, drawing under the name of Vicky.

== Biography ==
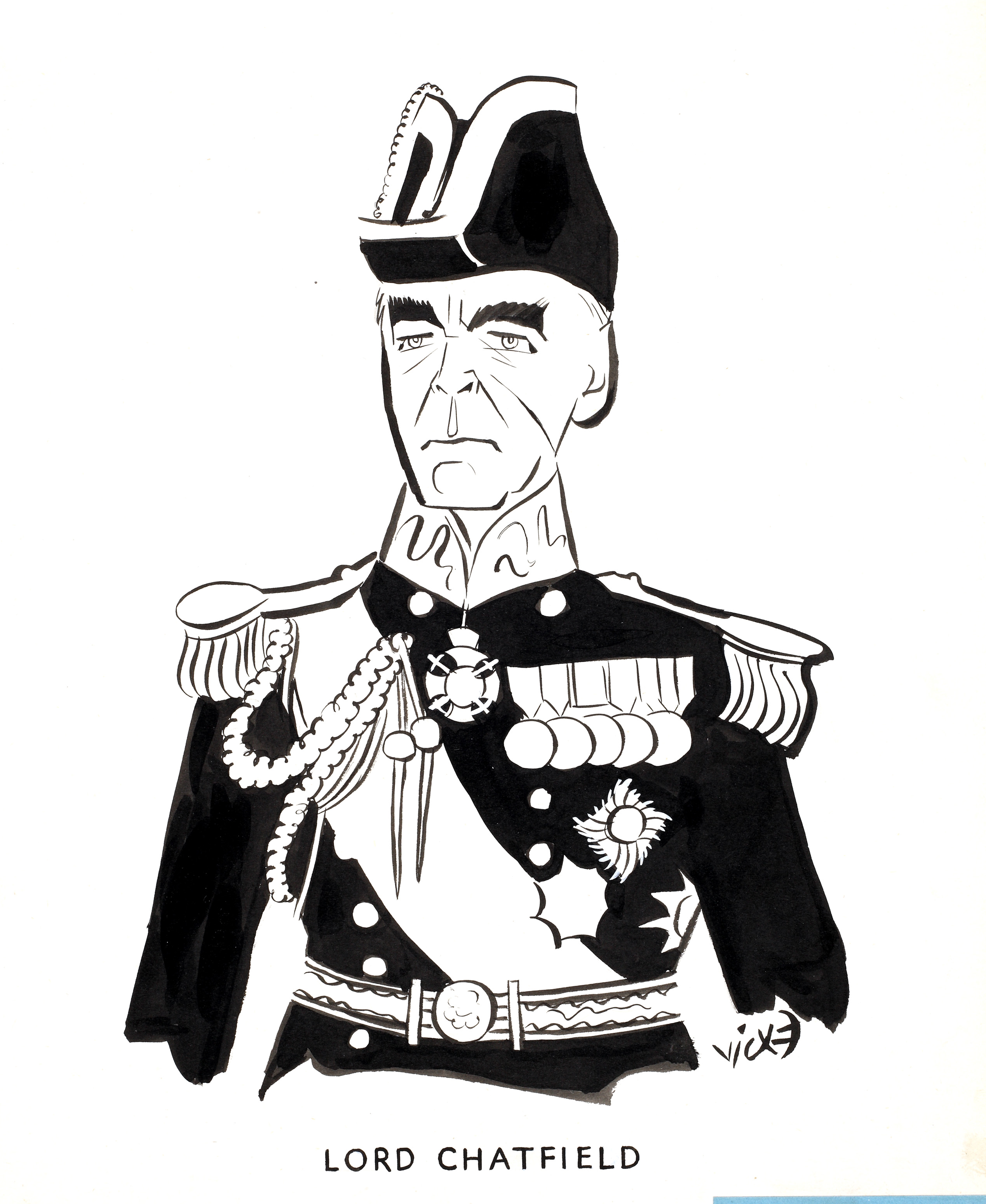
Weisz's caricature of Ernle Chatfield, 1st Baron Chatfield

Weisz was born in Berlin, Germany, to Hungarian-Jewish parents. He studied at the Berlin School of Art and by 1928, at the age of fifteen, he was working as a freelancer, drawing caricatures. His father took his own life that same year and Weisz began work with the journal 12 Uhr Blatt. His work also appeared in other German newspapers.

Weisz's cartoons took a very strong anti-Nazi stance. When the Nazis came to power in Germany, they took over the journal where Weisz worked. As a member of the Jewish community with expressed socialist opinions, Weisz decided to leave Germany.

In 1935, he went to live in the United Kingdom, and worked for the News Chronicle, Daily Mirror and Evening Standard. He maintained an independent stance, whatever the political hue of his employers (Liberal, Labour and Conservative respectively), and built a reputation as an incisive commentator on political events.

At the Daily Mirror, Weisz published the Nazi Nugget series. By the 1940s, Weisz, using the pseudonym "Vicky", was one of the leading British left-wing cartoonists. Weisz worked alongside fellow left-wing cartoonist Philip Zec at the Mirror and replaced him as the paper's chief political cartoonist in 1954.

In the 1950s boom years, many observers felt that the Prime Minister Harold Macmillan's demeanour as an Edwardian aristocrat was out of step with the times. "Vicky", as the lead political cartoonist of the News Chronicle, ridiculed him as 'Supermac', a spoof on the American comic-strip hero Superman. Contrary to the cartoonist's intention, the title Supermac benefited Macmillan, who went on to increase his parliamentary majority at the 1959 General Election. Earlier in the 1950s, Vicky had produced some memorable cartoons of Macmillan's predecessor, Sir Anthony Eden, which made effective use of the Homburg hat that had been Eden's "trademark" in the 1930s.

Victor Weisz followed his father in suffering from depression and insomnia; he committed suicide at his London home on 23 February 1966 aged 52, dying at 22 Upper Wimpole Street, Westminster. He left a widow, Inglelore Weisz, and an estate valued at £22,322.
