= Carson and Others v The United Kingdom (2010) =

European Court of Human Rights case

Case of Carson and Others v The United Kingdom
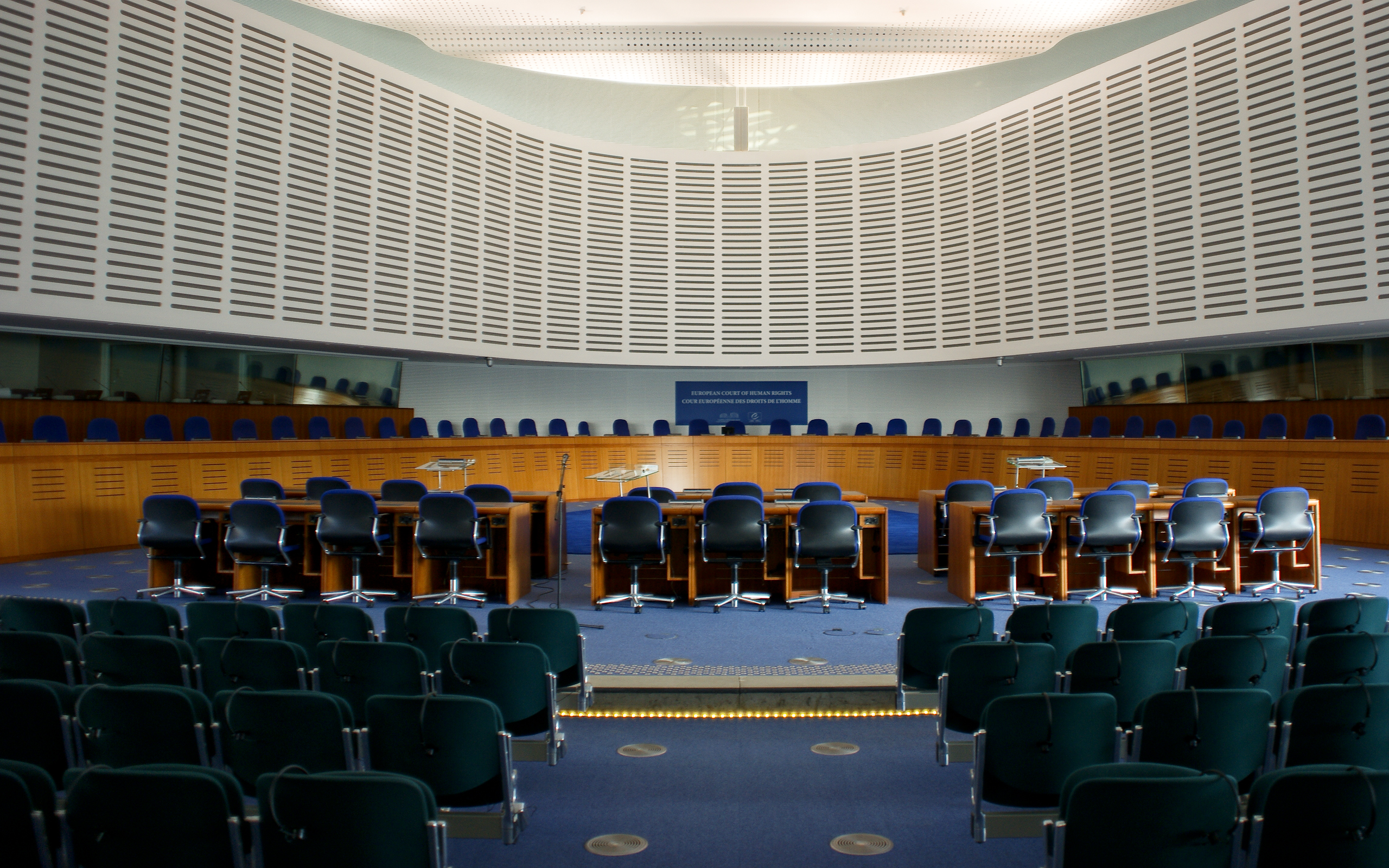
- European Court of Human Rights – Strasbourg
- Court: European Court of Human Rights, Grand Chamber – Strasbourg, France
- Full case name: Carson and Others v. The United Kingdom – 42184/05
- Decided: 16 March 2010
- ECLI: ECLI:CE:ECHR:2010:0316JUD004218405

Case history
- Appealed from: European Court of Human Rights, Fourth Section – Strasbourg, France (Carson and Others v The United Kingdom (2008))

Court membership
- Judges sitting: Jean-Paul Costa (President), Christos Rozakis, Nicolas Bratza, Peer Lorenzen, Françoise Tulkens, Josep Casadevall, Karel Jungwiert, Nina Vajić, Dean Spielmann, Renate Jaeger, Danutė Jočienė, Ineta Ziemele, Isabelle Berro-Lefèvre, Päivi Hirvelä, Luis López Guerra, Mirjana Lazarova Trajkovska, Zdravka Kalaydjieva

Keywords
- Right to property Prohibition of discrimination State Pension; Frozen State Pension

Carson and Others v The United Kingdom [2010] ECHR 338 was heard by the European Court of Human Rights (ECHR), (Grand Chamber) in Strasbourg on 16 March 2010 on appeal from the European Court of Rights (ECHR), Fourth Section before Jean-Paul Costa (President), Christos Rozakis, Nicolas Bratza, Peer Lorenzen, Françoise Tulkens, Josep Casadevall, Karel Jungwiert, Nina Vajić, Dean Spielmann, Renate Jaeger, Danutė Jočienė, Ineta Ziemele, Isabelle Berro-Lefèvre, Päivi Hirvelä, Luis López Guerra, Mirjana Lazarova Trajkovska, Zdravka Kalaydjieva.

Prior to the judgment being handed down, the judges had met privately on 2 September 2009 and 27 January 2010.

== Background ==
This is a Human Rights Act 1998 case under Article 34 of the convention:

"The Court may receive applications from any person, non-governmental organization or group of individuals claiming to be the victim of a violation....of rights enshrined in the Convention or one of the protocols to it."

National Insurance Contributions are paid in the United Kingdom by employees and those that are self-employed, by those who earn an income over a set limit, and by employers of those employees. It is also possible for UK nationals living abroad to make National Insurance Contributions in order that they can maintain their social security record which may lead to a larger UK state pension on retirement. Examples of the social security benefits that are paid from National Insurance Contributions include Jobseeker's Allowance; Employment and Support Allowance (formerly known as incapacity benefit; Maternity Allowance; Widow’s Pension; Bereavement benefit; State pension; Child's Special Allowance; and Guardian's allowance. All of these benefits are financed by the UK government on a "pay as you go" system from the National Insurance Fund. If there is insufficient funds then the UK government finances them out of general taxation. The National Insurance Fund was also used to partly fund the National Health Service. ^{paras 37,38}

To qualify for a UK state pension, a person needs to reach a certain age. For men, this was 65 and for women, 60. In order to qualify for a "full" UK state pension, men needed 44 National Insurance qualifying years, and women needed 39. In the 2007 Pensions Act, this was changed to 30 qualifying years for men and women. In the 2014 Pensions Act, implemented in April 2016, this was changed to 35 qualifying years for men and women. For those individuals living in the UK who do not qualify for a UK state pension - there are other social welfare benefits that they can apply for. ^{paras 39,40}

The UK government is compelled by law to increase the UK state pension annually to maintain its value as prices rise. The UK state pension increases are only available to residents of the UK - UK pensioners living abroad are not entitled to the increases. There are exceptions to this for those UK pensioners who live in countries that have negotiated bilateral social security agreements with the UK. Bilateral social security agreements cover other aspects of social welfare besides the increases to the UK state pension such as health benefits. The UK has reciprocal social security agreements with the European Economic Area countries and with a number of other disparate countries (such as the United States) Social security bilateral agreements were negotiated between 1948 and 1992. There were agreements with Australia (1953), New Zealand (1956) and Canada (1959) but these did not require payment of an up-rated UK state pension. The agreement with Australia was terminated by Australia in March 2001 because of the refusal of the UK government to uprate the state pension to UK pensioners living in Australia. In 1995, amendments to the Pensions Bill were tabled giving the increase to all UK pensioners regardless of where they lived. The cost to uprate these pensions, and also to pay for them to be backdated, was estimated to cost £4 billion which represented 0.79% of the 2008-09 Pension Budget. These amendments were defeated in both the House of Commons and the House of Lords. The 1952 International Labour Organization's Social Security Convention provides that the old age security benefit can be suspended by UK domestic law if the recipient of the old age security lives abroad. This is also supported by Article 68 of the 1964 European Code of Social Security and Article 74 of the 1990 European Code of Social Security The 1982 International Law Organization allowed that social security rights could be extended to UK pensioners living abroad subject to bilateral agreements being negotiated. A Council of Europe initiative in 2008, tried to negotiate a new framework for coordinating social security schemes but each of the countries within the European Union decided to keep the bilateral agreements that were already in place. ^{paras 42-51}

== Judgment ==
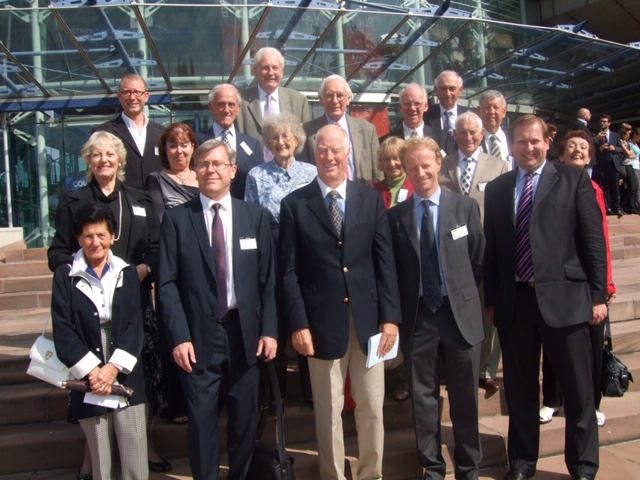
Annette Carson and other applicants and their legal team prior to first hearing before the ECHR Grand Chamber - 2 September 2009

The same 13 applicants were appealing against the decision of the European Court of Human Rights - Fourth Section case. The Court summarized the circumstances of each of the Applicants. ^{paras. 10-24} The Court then reviewed the domestic proceedings that Carson had brought against the UK government, including Lord Carswell's dissenting opinion in the House of Lords Appeal.

The Applicants contended that their human rights had been violated under Article 1 of Protocol No. 1 - "Right to property" on its own and in conjunction with Article 14 of the Convention and Article 8 of the European Convention on Human Rights in conjunction with Article 14 (six applicants). The applicants also argued that they were being discriminated against because they were not receiving the annual increase to their UK state pension whilst others in a similar position to them were. ^{paras. 25–36; para 52}

The ECHR Fourth Section had previously decided that the complaint under Article 1 of Protocol No. 1 taken alone was inadmissible. It also decided that Article 1 of Protocol No. 1 taken in conjunction with Article 14 was admissible, and that Article 14 taken in conjunction with Article 8 did not need to be examined. ^{para 53}

Under Article 1 of Protocol No. 1, the adding of "country of residence" in determining whether a UK pensioner should receive the annual increase to the UK state pension involved a "deprivation or interference" with the right to receiving the annual increase. In addition, the "possession" that UK pensioners have (in the UK state pension that they receive) was being eroded every year for which they did not receive the annual increase. The applicants argued that the ECHR Fourth section had only dealt with the first of the two complaints above. With respect to Article 14 taken in conjunction with Article 8 had not been heard in UK court proceedings brought by Carson (alone), and therefore should not have been dismissed so lightly in the ECHR Fourth Section. ^{paras 54,55}

The UK government argued that Article 14 taken in conjunction with Article 8 for all the applicants (other than Carson) should be declared inadmissible since they had not brought proceedings before the UK courts. Since Article 14 in conjunction with Article 8 had not been tested in the UK courts, it should be declared inadmissible to this Court. ^{para 56}

The Court maintained that, under UK domestic law, under Article 1 Protocol No. 1, the applicants do not have a right to receive the annual uprating. This had been dismissed by the ECHR Fourth Section and cannot be appealed. The Court did not accept the UK government's objections to Article 1 of Protocol No. 1 for the 12 applicants that had not filed domestic proceedings in the UK, and given that Carson had failed in that regard, there was no point in them litigating in the UK. The Court declared that Article 14 taken in conjunction with Article 8 should be inadmissible, because this had not been tested in the UK domestic courts. ^{paras 57-60}

The Court accepted that the UK government was better placed to understand "..what is in the public interest on social or economic grounds". The Court discounted the hardship that "freezing" the UK state pension had on the applicants, and thousands like them, since "any welfare system, to be workable, may have to use broad categorizations to distinguish between different groups in need". The question before the court was whether different groups of UK pensioners were in similar situations such that one group was discriminated against over the other. Article 14 by itself has no meaning in law, since it is an anti-discrimination law, without identifying who or what is being discriminated against, so, in order to be used the applicants case must be "within scope" of one or more of the underlying Article(s). The ECHR Fourth Section had found that the applicants case was within the scope of Article 1 of Protocol No. 1. The Court agrees with this assessment, and there was no argument relating to this from the UK government. The ECHR Fourth Section had agreed that "country of residence" fell within scope of Article 14. ^{paras 61-66}

The Applicants maintained that the treating of "residence" was an aspect of "personal status" and was consistent with previous decisions. In addition, their position is that whilst moving abroad is a question of "free choice" it is not so if it is driven by the need or desire to be close to family members. The UK government had conceded in the UK domestic courts that Carson's "foreign residence" was protected under Article 14, but argued that moving abroad was a matter of choice. The third party, Age Concern, and Help the Aged emphasized the importance of family support in old age. The Court supported the decision by the ECHR Fourth Section in concluding that "place of residence" is an aspect of "personal status". ^{paras 67-71}

The Court understood that there were three cohort of UK pensioners - those that live in the UK; those that live abroad but in a country that has a reciprocal social security agreement with the UK; and those that live abroad but in countries that do not have reciprocal social security agreements with the UK. In addition, the UK's social welfare and pension system was primarily for UK pensioners living in the UK. The Court did not believe that the pensioners in the second and third categories could be compared against each other. ^{para 72}

=== The Applicants submission ===
The Applicants argued that there was no difference between the UK pensioners who live abroad and therefore they should be treated the same regarding the annual UK state pension increase. They agreed with the dissenting opinions expressed by Lord Carswell (House of Lords Appeal), and by Judge Garlicki, President, ECHR Fourth Section that UK Pensioners will have spent major parts of their life working in the UK, and all would have made the same National Insurance Contributions, regardless of where they had chosen to live, and therefore they are all entitled to the same UK state pension. The UK state pension was a contributory system and the UK government themselves had made it available to some UK pensioners living abroad. Regardless of "country of residence" all UK pensioners would want to maintain the same standard of living. There was no empirical evidence to support differences in social economic conditions in countries where uprating was paid and in those countries where it wasn't. The Court should not put too much emphasis on the 1952 International Labour Organisation Convention, since this focused on social security systems in general and not specifically related to contributory pensions in particular. Under UK domestic law, the existence of reciprocal arrangements was not a requirement for the UK state pension to be increased. In addition, there was no pattern between those countries where reciprocal arrangements with the UK existed and those countries where they didn't. Once the UK government had decided that all pensioners should receive a UK state pension (regardless of which country they lived in), then it was irrational not to pay the same amount to everyone on an on-going basis. ^{paras 73-78}

=== The UK Government's submission ===
The UK Government restated that the UK social security and taxation system is designed for the benefit of residents of the UK. They also argued that there were distinct differences between those pensioners living abroad that received the annual increase versus those that don't. There was no practical way in which the factors that influence the annual increase - inflation, economic growth, and fluctuations in exchange rates - could be compared (or aligned) between countries. The UK government contended that National Insurance Contributions paid into the National Insurance Fund cannot be equated to contributions to an occupational or private pension. There are no guaranteed entitlements. UK pensioners living abroad fall into two groups - those that live in countries where social security bilateral agreements with the UK have been negotiated (in which case, the UK pensioners receive the annual increase) and those that live in countries that do not have social security bilateral agreements with the UK (in which case, the UK pensioners do not receive the annual increase). The UK government argued that these are two different groups of pensioners and the UK government were well with their rights to treat them differently. If they were to be treated the same, then this would "negate the power to enter into bilateral treaties of this kind". ^{paras 79-82}

=== The Courts Assessment ===
The Applicants believed that they were in the same position as those UK pensioners that lived abroad and received the annual increase - "National Insurance Contributions have no exclusive link to retirement pensions". They form part of the revenue which is used to pay a number of social security benefits, and because of this, the two different groups of UK pensioners living outside the UK can be regarded as the same. National Insurance Contributions go towards maintaining a minimum standard of living for residents of the UK. UK pensioners living outside the UK cannot be compared with those living in the UK due to "differing economic and social conditions". *The Court did not believe that the two groups of UK pensioners living abroad (those countries that have bilateral agreements, and those that don't) could be regarded as the same. ^{paras 84-90}

The Court agreed unanimously that the complaint under Article 14 of the Convention taken in conjunction with Article 8 inadmissible; Rejected unanimously the UK government's preliminary objection concerning the admissibility of the complaints of the applicants, other than Carson herself, and agreed, by eleven votes to six that there had been no violation of Article 14 of the Convention taken in conjunction with Article 1 of Protocol No. 1.

=== Dissenting Opinions ===
The six dissenting judges agreed that Article 14, taken in conjunction with Article 1 of Protocol No 1 had been violated, and that Article 14 on its own had also been violated. All of the Applicants were in the same boat even though their countries of residence may be different. The majority approach regarding "residence" seemed self contradictory, and inconsistent with the spirit of Article 14, and the conclusion of the majority regarding the characteristics of UK pensioners living in the UK and those living in "frozen" countries was wrong because, other than "country of residence", there is no difference between UK pensioners living abroad - they all paid into the same system and therefore all of them are entitled to a UK State Pension which is based on the number of contributing years. Whilst the majority of the judges decided that even though all UK pensioners living abroad had made equal contributions to the National Insurance system that does not mean that they can be treated the same. The majority argued that the State pension has multiple sources, but those dissenting could not see the relevance of that and because all UK pensioners living abroad paid into the system they should all be treated the same. The right to a UK state pension and the right to be treated the same is based on the rules by which a pensioner receives a UK state pension.

All pensioners living abroad (whether or not they received the annual increase) had a common characteristic - their buying power was decreased every year based on the drop in currency exchange rates. Those pensioners who lived in the UK received inflationary increases every year. Those pensioners living abroad who received the increase received the same increase as those in the UK regardless of the increase of the inflationary rate in their own country. For those countries that had higher inflationary rates then UK pensioners living in those countries would find their UK state pension depreciating compared to those pensioners living in the UK. Those pensioners living in countries like South Africa who did not receive annual increases found that their UK state pension was depreciating at an even faster rate. In Carson's case this was significant. In the period 2000-2005 she found that her weekly UK state pension had fallen by 28%. Comparing this to a pensioner living in the UK the comparative loss increased further with time.

The dissenting judges could see no relevant differences between those UK pensioners that lived abroad and received the annual increase and those that lived abroad and didn't receive the increase, and could see no justification for such a radical difference in the UK state pension received. In addition, they were not persuaded by the UK government to decide otherwise and that their argument went against the spirit of Article 14 of the convention.

Whilst the UK state pension system is designed to ensure that the financial needs of pensioners living in the UK are taken into account the dissenting judges could see no justification for treating them unfavorably and unequally. There will always be differences in the increases in inflation for each country and the impact that this has on the buying power of the UK state pension. The fall in the sterling exchange rate has been consistent for over a century, and the impact that this has on UK pensioners living overseas in "frozen" countries can cause irreparable deterioration in the real value of their UK state pension. The complete denial of any increases represents a disproportionate difference which cannot be justified.

UK pensioners living overseas do not receive health benefits, such as the National Health Service and nor do they pay UK taxes - this is no reason as to why they should not receive the annual increase since, UK taxes forgone are less than the housing, healthcare and social welfare benefits which are payable to pensioners living in the UK but not those who live abroad. ^{Dissenting opinions}

The UK Government prevailed; Carson and the other Applicants lost their appeal and they had run out of Courts to appeal to.

Cited as: [2010] ECHR 338, 51 EHRR 13, (2010) 51 EHRR 13, 29 BHRC 22

== Citations ==
Burden v. The United Kingdom, Application No. 13378/05; R (Carson) v. Secretary of State for Work and Pensions (2002); R (Carson and Reynolds) v. Secretary of State for Work and Pensions (2003); R (Carson and Reynolds) v. Secretary of State for Work and Pensions (2005); Van der Mussele v. Belgium (1983); K. and T. v. Finland', Application no. 25702/94 Šilih v. Slovenia, Application no. 71463/01 Kjeldsen, Busk Madsen and Pedersen v. Denmark, judgment of 7 December 1976, Series A no. 23; D.H. and Others v. the Czech Republic [GC], Application no. 57325/00; Stec and Others v. the United Kingdom (dec.) [GC], Application nos. 65731/01 and 65900/01 Andrejeva v. Latvia [GC], no. 55707/00; Runkee and White v. the United Kingdom, Application nos. 42949/98 and 53134/99; Godbout v. Longueuil (City) [1997] SCR 844 (Canadian Supreme Court); Engel and Others v. The Netherlands, judgment of 8 June 1976, Series A no. 22, § 72; Johnston v. Ireland, judgment of 18 December 1986, Series A no. 112, §§ 59-61; Darby v Sweden (1991) 13 EHRR 774; Lindsay and Others v. the United Kingdom, Application no. 8364/78, Commission decision of 8 March 1979, Decisions and Reports 15, p. 247; Gudmundsson v. Iceland, Application no. 23285/94, Commission decision of 17 January 1996, unreported; Magee v. the United Kingdom, judgment of 6 June 2000, Application no. 28135/95

== See also ==
- UK employment discrimination law
- Human Rights Act 1998
- Protocol 1 of Article 1 of the European Court of Human Rights
- Article 8 of the European Convention on Human Rights
- Article 14 of the Convention
- Article 34 of the European Convention for the Protection of Human Rights and Fundamental Freedoms
