= Carson and Others v The United Kingdom (2008) =

European Court of Human Rights case

Case of Carson and Others v The United Kingdom (Application no. 42184/05)
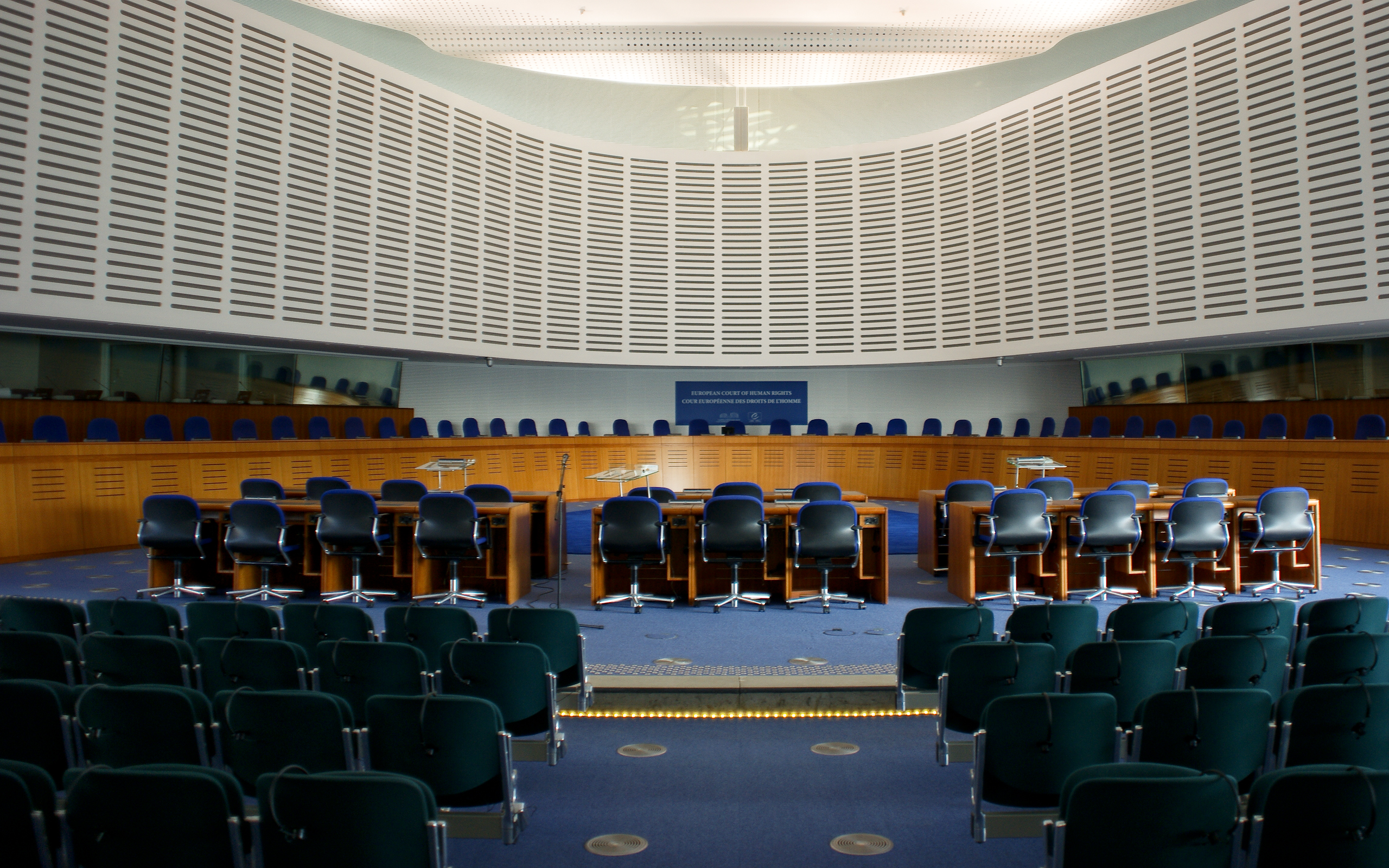
- Court: European Court of Human Rights, Fourth Section – Strasbourg, France
- Full case name: Carson and Others v. The United Kingdom – 42184/05
- Decided: November 4, 2008
- ECLI: ECHR:1194

Case history
- Appealed from: House of Lords – Opinions of the Lords of Appeal for Judgment (R (Carson) v Secretary of State for Work and Pensions)
- Appealed to: European Court of Human Rights, Grand Chamber – Strasbourg, France (Carson and Others v The United Kingdom (2010))

Court membership
- Judges sitting: Lech Garlicki (President), Nicolas Bratza, Giovanni Bonello, Ljiljana Mijović, David Thór Björgvinsson, Ledi Bianku, Mihai Poalelungi

Keywords
- Right to property Prohibition of discrimination State Pension; Frozen State Pension

Carson and Others v The United Kingdom [2008] ECHR 1194 was heard by the European Court of Human Rights (ECHR), Fourth Section (Lower Chamber) in Strasbourg on 4 November 2008 appeal from the Appellate Committee of the House of Lords before Lech Garlicki (President); Nicolas Bratza; Giovanni Bonello; Ljiljana Mijović; David Thór Björgvinsson; Ledi Bianku; Mihai Poalelungi.

Prior to the judgment being handed down on 4 November 2008, the judges had met privately on 3 May 2007 and 7 October 2008. On 24 January 2008, the non-governmental organization Age Concern England was granted leave to intervene as a third party.

== Background ==
This is a Human Rights Act 1998 case on "Right to property" Article 1 of the First Protocol (Protection of Property) and Article 14 of the convention (Prohibition of Discrimination taken in conjunction with Article 8 of the European Convention on Human Rights.

The Applicants contended that the United Kingdom authorities refusal to uprate their UK state pension in line with their peers in the UK, EEA, and a number of other disparate countries such as the United States was discriminatory and therefore in breach of Article 14 taken in conjunction with Article 8 of the convention and in breach of Article 1 of Protocol No 1 on its own.

The case originated from an application against the United Kingdom of Great Britain and Northern Ireland which was lodged with the Court under Article 34 of the European Convention for the Protection of Human Rights and Fundamental Freedoms (“the Convention”) by thirteen British nationals:

Name	Country of Residence	Narrative
Carson, Annette	South Africa	Annette Carson spent most of her working life in the United Kingdom paying National Insurance Contributions in full, before relocating to South Africa for work purposes in 1989, where she has been resident since 1990. From 1989 to 1999 she paid further National Insurance Contributions on a voluntary basis to maintain her entitlement to a full UK state pension on retirement
Jackson, Bernard	Canada	Bernard Jackson spent 50 years working in the United Kingdom paying National Insurance Contributions in full. He emigrated to Canada on his retirement in 1986 and became eligible for a UK state pension in 1987.
Stewart, Venice	Canada	Venice Stewart spent 15 years working in the United Kingdom paying National Insurance Contributions in full, before emigrating to Canada in 1964. She became eligible for a UK state pension in 1991.
Kendall, Ethel	Canada	Ethel Kendall spent 45 years working in the United Kingdom paying National Insurance Contributions in full before retiring in 1976. She became eligible for a UK state pension in 1973, and she emigrated to Canada in 1986.
Dean, Kenneth	Canada	Ken Dean spent 51 years working in the United Kingdom paying National Insurance Contributions in full, before retiring in 1991. He became eligible for a UK state pension in 1988, and emigrated to Canada in 1994.
Buchanan, Robert	Canada	Robert Buchanan spent 47 years working in the United Kingdom paying National Insurance Contributions in full, before emigrating to Canada in 1985. He became eligible for a UK state pension in 1989.
Doyle, Terence	Canada	Terrence Doyle spent 42 years working in the United Kingdom paying National Insurance Contributions in full, before retiring in 1995 and emigrating to Canada in 1998. He became eligible for a UK state pension in 2002.
Gould, John	Canada	John Gould spent 44 years working in the United Kingdom paying National Insurance Contributions in full, before retiring and emigrating to Canada in 1994. He became eligible for a UK state pension in 1998.
Dancer, Geoff	Canada	Geoff Dancer spent 44 years working in the United Kingdom paying National Insurance Contributions in full, before emigrating to Canada in 1981. He became eligible for a UK state pension in 1986.
Hill, Penelope	Australia	Penelope Hill was born in Australia in 1940 and she remained an Australian national. She lived and worked in the United Kingdom between 1963 and 1982, paying National Insurance Contributions in full, before returning to Australia in 1982. She made further National Insurance Contributions for the tax years 1992–1999 and became eligible for a UK state pension in 2000. Between August 2002 and December 2004 she spent over half her time in London.
Shrubshole, Bernard	Australia	Bernard Shrubshole's National Insurance contributions record in the United Kingdom qualified him for a full basic UK state pension in 1998. He emigrated to Australia in 2000.
Markiewicz, Lothar	Australia	Lothar Markiewicz spent 51 years working in the United Kingdom paying National Insurance Contributions in full, and became eligible for a UK state pension in 1989. In 1993 he emigrated to Australia.
Godfrey, Rosemary	Australia	Rosemary Godfrey spent 10 years working in the United Kingdom between 1954 and 1965 and paying National Insurance Contributions in full, before emigrating to Australia in 1965. She became eligible for a UK state pension in 1994. She is ineligible for any old age security benefits from the Australian Government, and is thus dependent on her UK state pension as her only source of income.

== Judgment ==
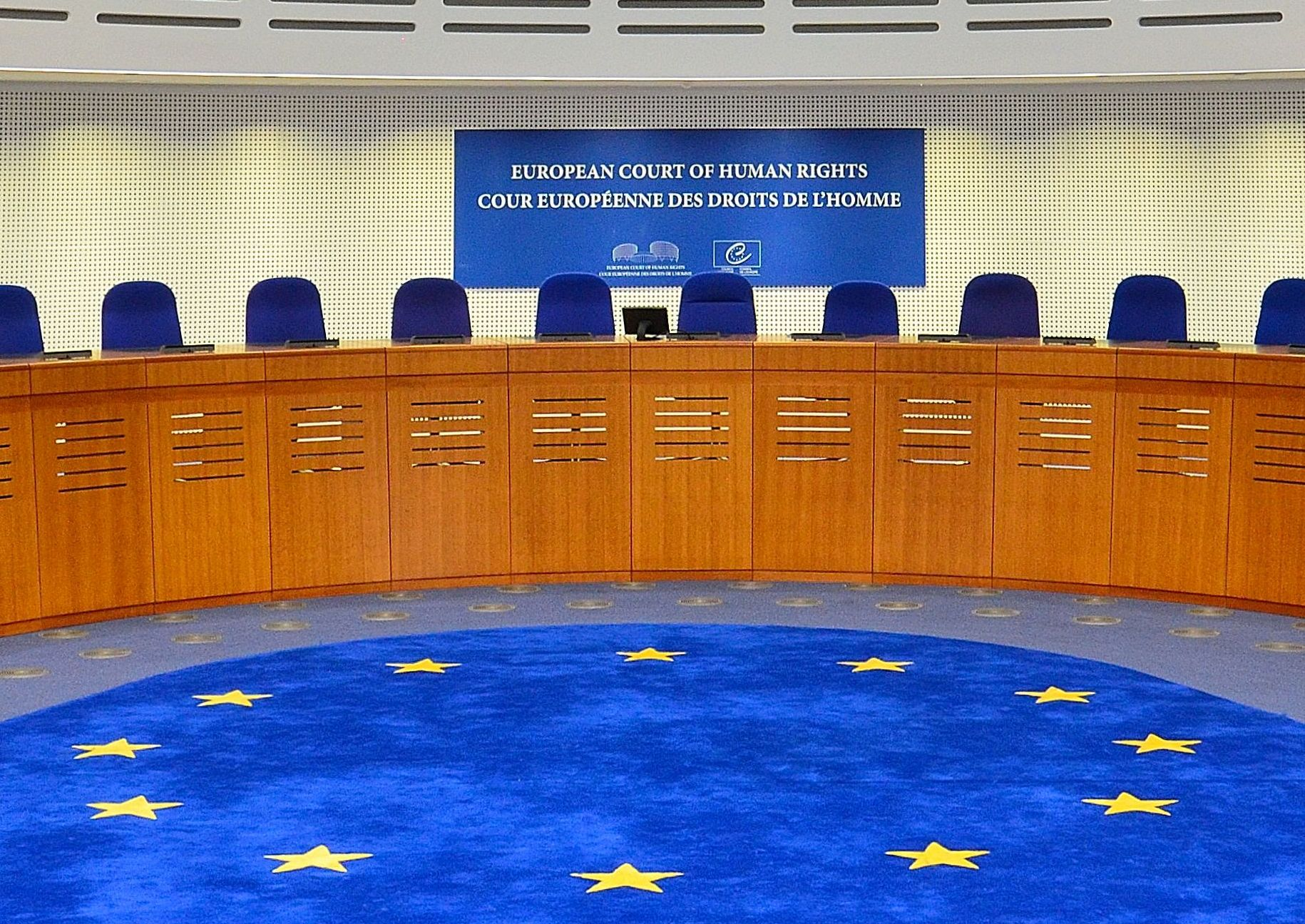
Courtroom of the ECHR

The court reviewed the three United Kingdom hearings brought by Carson:

a). Administration Court of the Queen's Bench Division in the High Court of Justice before the Honorable Mr. Justice Burnton – 2002. ^{paras. 24-28}
b). Court of Appeal (Civil Division) in the Supreme Court before Lord Justice Brown, Lord Justice Laws, and Lord Justice Rix – 2003. ^{paras. 29-31}
c). Appellate Committee of the House of Lords before Lord Nicholls of Birkenhead, Lord Hoffmann, Lord Rodger of Earlsferry, Lord Walker of Gestingthorpe, Lord Carswell – 2005. ^{paras. 32-36}

The Court stated Lord Carswell's dissenting opinion:

"How persons spend their income and where they do so are matters for their own choice. Some may choose to live in a country where the cost of living is low or the exchange rate favorable, a course not uncommon in previous generations, which may or may not carry with it disadvantages, but that is a matter for their personal choice. The common factor for purposes of comparison is that all of the pensioners, in whichever country they may reside, have duly paid the contributions required to qualify for their pensions. If some of them are not paid pensions at the same rate as others, that in my opinion constitutes discrimination for the purposes of Article 14 ...”.

The UK state retirement pension is a contributory benefit paid when a UK pensioner retired based on the number of social security contributing years. ^{para 37} The system in the UK allows for annual increases to the UK state pension based on the inflation rate in the UK. ^{para 38} All pensioners living in the UK receive this increase as well as UK pensioners resident in certain other countries. ^{paras 39,40}

Each year, via secondary legislation known as Statutory Instruments, legislation is passed in the UK that sets out in Regulation 5 who should be restricted from receiving the annual increase to the UK state pension:

"Regulation 5 of the Social Security Benefit (Persons Abroad) Regulations 1975(7) (application of disqualification in respect of up-rating of benefit) shall apply to any additional benefit payable by virtue of the Up-rating Order." ^{paras 41, 42}.

Those UK pensioners living in the European Union or a country with whom the UK has negotiated a social security reciprocal agreement will also receive the same increase as those pensioners living in the UK ^{paras 43-45}. However, according to the Third Report (January 1997) of the House of Commons Social Security Committee the existence of a bilateral agreement is not necessary for the annual uprating to be paid since this is regulated purely by domestic legislation. Uprating is not applied to pensioners living in those countries that do not have these bilateral agreements in place. ^{para 46} The report also states:

"It is impossible to discern any pattern behind the selection of countries with whom bilateral agreements have been made providing for up-rating". ^{para 47},

and Minister of State (Jeff Rooker), on 13 November 2000, in a statement to the House of Commons said:

"I have already said I am not prepared to defend the logic of the present situation. It is illogical. There is no consistent pattern. It does not matter whether a country is in the Commonwealth or outside it. We have arrangements with some Commonwealth countries and not with others. Indeed, there are differences among Caribbean countries. This is an historical issue and the situation has existed for years" ^{para 47}

The Court determined that international law provisions support the UK Government's decisions to exclude a person's right to a benefit:

"as long as the person concerned is absent from the territory of the Contracting Party concerned". ^{paras 48,49}

Many countries only pay benefits to those residing in that country. The UK is unique in paying the benefit to some expatriates whilst excluding others, purely based on country of residence. ^{para 50}.

Witness statements have been submitted by Australian civil servants (British pensioners living in Australia do not receive the annual increase) highlighting the impact on the 220,000 UK pensioners living there which the Australian government see as unlawful discrimination. As a result of this, in 2001, the Australian government terminated their social security bilateral agreement with the UK. In contrast, the Australian pensioners living in the UK have their Australian state pension uprated in the same way as if they had remained in Australia. ^{para 51}

Witness statements have also been submitted by Canadian civil servants. In Canada, there are 151,000 UK pensioners who are also impacted since Canada does not have a social security reciprocal arrangement with the UK. The Canadian government also believe that the UK is discriminating against UK pensioners living there, which is in violation of the Canada/United Kingdom Social Security Convention. ^{para 52}

=== The Applicants position ===
The Applicants contended that the entitlement to a basic UK state pension is a "possession" within Article of Protocol 1, and the UK government were depriving them of part of that "possession" i.e. the annual uprating. They were being denied this uprating because they lived in countries (Australia, Canada and South Africa, in the applicants case) that did not have a social security reciprocal agreement with the UK, and therefore they lived in "frozen countries" since their UK state pension was "frozen" at the value first received. All of these applicants had been adversely affected financially because they were not receiving the annual uprating, and since the countries that they lived in had their own inflation rate, their state pension was being eroded and therefore it had less buying power year on year.

The Applicants also contended that Article 1 or Protocol 1, in conjunction with Article 14 also applied and they believed that previous interpretations of case law had been too narrow and superseded by more recent case law. Whilst the UK Government had maintained that moving abroad was a freedom of choice, for many, this was the only way they could be closer to their family. They felt that they were being unfairly discriminated against. This discrimination, based on grounds of where a person chooses to retire is central to the enjoyment of certain human rights such as the right to family life, freedom of movement, and human dignity. This is likely to have a greater impact on women retiring since, statistically, they will live longer. Given this, the court is right to scrutinise the UK government.

The Applicants asked the court to consider carefully the justification used by the UK Government to treat pensioners differently based on "country of residence". There were three different cohorts of UK pensioners, those that live in the UK; those that live abroad, but in a country that has a social security reciprocal agreement with the UK; and those that live abroad, but in a country that does not have a social security reciprocal agreement with the UK. UK pensioners in the first two categories receive the annual increase whilst UK pensioners in the last group, which included all of the Applicants, never receive an increase. It is entirely possible that pensioners in all three groups above made exactly the same social security contribution and therefore it was the Applicants contention, they should all receive the same UK state pension.

It was for the UK government to prove that the reason for treating UK pensioners in the last category above differently is "objective and reasonable". Previous UK governments have admitted that there was no pattern between those countries where there was a social security bilateral agreement in place and those where there is no agreement in place – neighboring countries (for example, the US and Canada) are treated differently even though they may have similar economic conditions. In addition, there are "frozen" countries like Australia and Canada that uprate their state pensions, regardless of where their pensioners live. This reciprocity with the UK is not returned. There are many cases where UK pensioners living abroad do not receive the social welfare benefits that they would have receive if they had remained in the UK. ^{paras 59-62}

=== The UK Government's position ===
The UK Government confirmed that the applicants fell within the scope of Article 1 of Protocol No 1, but they didn't believe that Article 14 was appropriate even though, in Carson's appeal to the House of Lords in 2005 they were prepared to accept it. Since the applicants were from outside the UK, the UK government maintained that it was fair and reasonable to treat them differently. Social Security benefits, of which the UK state pension was one were meant for residents of the UK such that they could enjoy certain minimum standards. Systems that existed in other countries were also tailored to individuals living in those countries. In Carson's House of Lord's Appeal, Lord Hoffmann had said that those in need were "'generally recognised to be national in character ... it does not extend to inhabitants of foreign countries', and that this was enshrined in domestic legislation". The UK government agreed with Lord Hoffmann that it could not be the law that the United Kingdom was prohibited from treating expatriate pensioners generously unless it treated them in exactly the same way as pensioners at home. The UK government contended that they had to make decisions as to how financial resources should be allocated in order to achieve the best results. ^{paras 54-58}

=== The Third Party's position (Age Concern) ===
Pensioners become more frail as they get older and it is important that they have a support and welfare infrastructure around them, and in many cases this will be family. If a family lives outside of the UK, then their parents are more likely to join them. The Institute for Public Policy Research produced a report in 2006 that showed that 20% of older people had emigrated to be with family or for personal reasons i.e. not work related. Age Concern had carried out a number of focus groups that identified that one of the main reasons why older (in this case, Chinese) people have not returned to their country of birth is because they would no longer receive the annual increase to their UK state pension. In addition, in terms of the "most desirable" countries for emigration, five out of the top 10 are "frozen" countries – Australia, Canada, China, New Zealand and South Africa. It would be a fair assumption that for older people they have families in countries where the UK state pension is not uprated. Age Concern's own research had shown that in many countries the health and social welfare received there would not equate to that received in the UK. Those that did move, or had moved many years ago, will find financial hardship as a result of not receiving the annual increase to their UK state pension. The financial hardship will be felt more by women than men. This is because many women will not be receiving a full UK state pension because they will have fewer National Insurance Contribution years due to the fact that they took time off from work to have a family. It is also unlikely that they will have an occupational pension to fall back on. Additionally, life expectancy for women is greater than that for men. ^{paras 63-66}

=== The Court's Assessment ===
Article 1 of Protocol 1 only protects "current possessions" and not "possessions" that might be acquired in the future, therefore there is no right to receive any social security benefits other than those that are mandated by domestic legislation. Under UK legislation there is no provision for uprating in the countries where the applicants reside (Australia, Canada and South Africa), since these countries do not have social security reciprocal agreements with the UK. Just because the applicants paid all of their National Insurance contributions does not entitle them to a prescribed state pension amount. This is different to private occupational schemes because in those cases there is a "contract" between the provider and the recipient. Article 1 of Protocol No 1 on its own is therefore inapplicable to the Applicants. Article 14 of the Convention cannot stand on its own, since it is a "discrimination" Article, and therefore needs to be used in conjunction with other Articles. Whilst there is no obligation for the UK Government to provide a state pension, if it does provide one, then it must do so in accordance with Article 1 of Protocol No 1 "in conjunction with" Article 14 of the convention. In this case, there is a clear difference in treatment of the three different cohorts of pensioners referred to above, and therefore the Applicants case "has to be classified as admissible". ^{paras 67-72}

Case law has determined that there cannot be discrimination under Article 14 if the difference between the way that the three cohorts of pensioners are treated is "objective and reasonable". However, the Court gives the UK Government wide latitude when considering the differences in treatment of the different groups of pensioners and the impact this has on economic or social strategy of a country. The UK Government has a much better knowledge of its society and needs compared to international courts, and the Court respects the "legislature's policy choice" unless it is "manifestly without reasonable foundation". Based on the decisions made in Carson's domestic appeals, for the purposes of Article 14, being resident outside the UK constituted a "personal characteristic". ^{paras 73-74}

There have been many cases that have been cited with regard to Article 14 – however, as was pointed out in the very first Carson Case by Justice Burnton those cases were not comparable to the current case. As far as the current case was concerned, the Court determined that "country of residence" can be deemed to be "personal status" and it falls within the scope of Article 14. Discrimination only occurs if similar situations are treated differently. The Applicants contend that there is no difference between the three cohorts of pensioners since they all spent similar amounts of time in the UK and paid the same National Insurance Contributions into the National Insurance Fund. In addition, the need for a reasonable standard of living is the same for all three groups of pensioners. All of the domestic courts (other than Lord Carswell in the House of Lords appeal) agreed that the three groups of pensioners do not have to be treated the same when it came to uprating the state pension. The UK state pension is designed to provide a "minimum standard of living for those living in the UK" and the Court found that the three groups of UK pensioners were not the same and therefore the UK Government could treat them differently. As far back as 1983 there was case law regarding a UK pensioner who had emigrated to Australia who was denied an uprated pension. In addition, in Carson's House of Lords appeal, the UK Government could have made the decision to not pay any UK state pension to "frozen" pensioners. When looking at all UK pensioners living overseas the Court could not find similarity between those pensioners who were living in "frozen" countries and those living in "unfrozen" countries. National Insurance Contributions are used for other purposes besides paying the UK state pension – the National Health Service for example. Even in those cases where there is proximity between "frozen" and "unfrozen" countries – Canada and the US, for example, there is still differences in their social security provision, taxation, rates of inflation, interest and currency exchange rates to make it difficult to compare them. The Court considers that these differences are "objective and reasonable" such that the Government can treat them differently even though the Third Party, Age Concern, made some powerful arguments as to why pensioners emigrate in the first place. Ultimately, it is down to a matter of "personal choice". In addition, the UK Government made people aware that if they moved abroad they could be moving to a "frozen" country where there UK state pension would not be uprated. The Court decided that the UK Government could decide which countries it wants to have reciprocal social security agreements with and which ones it doesn't based on its own economic policies. In the Court's opinion, the Government has not violated Article 14 taken in conjunction with Article 1 of Protocol No. 1. ^{paras 75-82}

The Applicants contended that as some of them had to weigh up whether to give up the annual uprating to their UK state pension or emigrate so that they could be closer to their adult children and grand children. The Court considers the same arguments apply to this contention as applies to Article 1 of Protocol No 1 in conjunction with Article 14, and therefore it was not necessary to consider this complaint separately. ^{paras 83-84}

The court decided by six votes to 1 that there had been no violation of Article 14 of the Convention taken in conjunction with Article 1 of Protocol No 1. ^{paras 81, 82}

=== The Dissenting opinion ===
The rules of the Court provide for a full explanation regarding dissenting opinions. In this case, it came from the President of the Court, Lech Garlicki:

The difference in treatment of different cohorts of pensioners has no objective and reasonable justification. There were four arguments that may have led to a different conclusion:

1. The UK State Pension is a compulsory system, and based on National Insurance contributions; Carson and the other Applicants had all paid into the same system as those pensioners living in the UK. The UK Government was happy to take these contributions, which were in turn, used to pay the UK State Pension to current pensioners at the time, and also the annual uprating to those pensioners. There was no difference between the contributions made by her and those of her peers in the UK. Now it was time for Carson to receive her UK state pension, but, because she had changed her "country of residence", she and the other Applicants were treated differently. The UK does not incur additional costs because Carson and the other Applicants live abroad.

"Considerations of social justice and equity require that persons who have duly contributed towards the pensions of others should not be treated differently in the subsequent calculations of their own pension"

2. All countries have inflation. Much has been made regarding the difference in costs of living, exchange rates, and inflation in different countries, and it is difficult to accept that there is a difference between the different cohorts of pensioners – those living in the UK compared to those that don't. The current regulations appear to penalise pensioners living in "frozen" countries, even though they have made contributions to the UK social security system all of their lives. This seems to be against the principle of individual freedom and therefore seems to be unjustified.
3. The system in the UK is illogical based on the statement made in November 2000 by the Minister of State, Mr Jeff Rooker to the House of Commons
4. Whilst the UK courts maintained that the Carson case is more legislative than judicial this view does not prevail in the ECHR.

"A violation that results from legislative omissions is still within the reach of European supervision". ^{Dissenting opinion}

Cited as:[2008] ECHR 1194, (2009) 48 EHRR 41, 48 EHRR 41

== Citations ==
Burden v. The United Kingdom, Application No. 13378/05; R (Carson) v. Secretary of State for Work and Pensions (2002); JW and EW v United Kingdom (Application No. 9776/82), unreported; Cornerv United Kingdom (App. No. 11271/84) 17 May 1985, unpublished; R (Carson and Reynolds) v. Secretary of State for Work and Pensions (2003); R (Carson and Reynolds) v. Secretary of State for Work and Pensions (2005); Van der Mussele v. Belgium (1983); Kjeldsen, Busk Madsen and Pedersen v. Denmark, judgment of 7 December 1976, Series A no. 23; Budak v. Turkey (dec.), Application no. 57345/00, 7 September 2004; Beale v. the United Kingdom ((dec.) Application no. 16743/03, 12 October 2004, unpublished; Marckx v. Belgium, judgment of 13 June 1979, Series A no. 31, § 50); Stec and Others v. the United Kingdom (dec.) [GC], Application nos. 65731/01 and 65900/01 D.H. and Others v. the Czech Republic [GC], Application no. 57325/00; Engel and Others v. The Netherlands, judgment of 8 June 1976, Series A no. 22, § 72; Johnston v. Ireland, judgment of 18 December 1986, Series A no. 112, §§ 59–61; Darby v Sweden (1991) 13 EHRR 774; Lindsay and Others v. the United Kingdom, Application no. 8364/78, Commission decision of 8 March 1979, Decisions and Reports 15, p. 247; Gudmundsson v. Iceland, Application no. 23285/94, Commission decision of 17 January 1996, unreported; Magee v. the United Kingdom, judgment of 6 June 2000, Application no. 28135/95 Van Raalte v. the Netherlands, judgment of 21 February 1997, Reports of Judgments and Decisions 1997-I, § 39 Gaygusuz v. Austria (16 September 1996, Reports of Judgments and Decisions 1996 IV) Koua Pouirrez v. France (Application no. 40892/98, ECHR 2003 X) Luczak v. Poland (Application no. 77782/01), ECHR 2007

== See also ==
- Human Rights Act 1998
- Protocol 1 of Article 1 of the European Court of Human Rights
- Article 8 of the European Convention on Human Rights
- Article 14 of the Convention
- Article 34 of the European Convention for the Protection of Human Rights and Fundamental Freedoms
