= Frozen pension =

Frozen pension may refer to:

- Frozen Occupational Pension, a pensions which have been left behind by people who are no longer employed by the sponsoring employer.
- Frozen state pension, practice of the British government in "freezing" state pensions for pensioners who live in certain overseas countries.
