= R (Carson) v Secretary of State for Work and Pensions =

- Court: Appellate Committee of the House of Lords (2005)
- Full case name: Opinions of the Lords of Appeal for Judgment in the Cause: Regina v Secretary of State for Work and Pensions (Respondent) ex parte Carson (Appellant); Regina v. Secretary of State for Work and Pensions (Respondent) ex parte Reynolds (FC) (Appellant)

Case history
- Appealed from: Court of Appeal (Civil Division) in the Supreme Court (Carson & Another v Secretary of State for Work and Pensions)
- Appealed to: European Court of Human Rights, Fourth Section (Carson and Others v The United Kingdom (2008))

Court membership
- Judges sitting: Lord Nicholls of Birkenhead, Lord Hoffmann, Lord Rodger of Earlsferry, Lord Walker of Gestingthorpe, Lord Carswell

Case opinions
- Concurrence: Lord Nicholls of Birkenhead, Lord Hoffmann, Lord Rodger of Earlsferry, Lord Walker of Gestingthorpe
- Concur/dissent: 4-1
- Dissent: Lord Carswell (on the Carson case)

Keywords
- Right to property Prohibition of discrimination Right to respect for "private and family life" Jobseeker's Allowance; Income Support; State Pension; Frozen State Pension

R (Carson) v Secretary of State for Work and Pensions [2005] UKHL 37 was heard by the Lords of Appeal in the House of Lords on 26 May 2005 before Lord Nicholls, Lord Hoffmann, Lord Rodger, Lord Walker, and Lord Carswell.

This civil action involved two litigants - Annette Carson and Joanne Reynolds, which was on appeal from the Supreme Court and was a UK labour law and Human Rights Act 1998 case on "Right to property" under Article 1 of the First Protocol (Protection of Property) and Article 14 of the convention (Prohibition of Discrimination. In Reynolds's case, there was also Article 8 - the right to respect for "private and family life" to consider.

== Background ==
Carson relocated from the UK to South Africa in 1989 for work purposes, and continued paying her National Insurance Contributions (NICs) to ensure that on retirement she would be eligible for the full UK State Pension. She started drawing her UK state pension in September 2000, and then she realised that the amount she received would not be increased each year in line with her peers in the UK, and her pension was being "frozen" at the level at which she first started receiving it. Carson contended that she was being discriminated against with regard to deprivation of the annual inflationary increase to her UK State Pension because she had relocated to South Africa ^{para 9}. In addition, Carson contended that the failure of the UK Government to pay the annual inflationary increase to the UK State Pension in some countries but not others contravened the European Convention on Human Rights (ECHR) and that she and many others were being discriminated against. She had found that the annual increase to the UK State Pension is payable in countries like the UK, the European Economic Area (EEA) and a number of disparate countries (the United States, for example), whilst not being payable in predominantly Commonwealth countries such as Australia, Canada, New Zealand and South Africa. Carson claimed that under Article 1 her state pension, or alternatively its uprating, are "pecuniary rights", and therefore "possessions" within the meaning of Article 1 of the First Protocol and Article 14. In her original case, Justice Burnton had found in favour of the UK Government, citing that the judiciary should not override legislative UK government policy. This was upheld in her appeal to the Supreme Court.

Reynolds was born on 9 November 1976. When she left school she began work and continued to work until she was made redundant on 12 October 2000. Whilst she was working she paid National Insurance Contributions. On 24 October 2000 she applied for Jobseeker's Allowance and it was paid with effect from that date. There are two different types of Jobseeker's Allowance - “JSA(C)” which is based on National Insurance Contributions paid over a prescribed minimum period and is not means-tested - the other “JSA(IB)” is income-based and a Means-tested benefit. Reynolds was paid the lesser of the two amounts and therefore was taking civil action against the UK Government saying that the UK Government's action was incompatible with Article 1 of the First Protocol to the convention; and under Article 14 of the convention she claimed she was being discriminated against because of her age; and under Article 8 of the ECHR (respect for her private life and her home); and finally her right not to be subjected to degrading treatment under Article 3 of ECHR (the prohibition of torture, and "inhuman or degrading treatment or punishment").

== Judgment ==
=== Carson's appeal ===
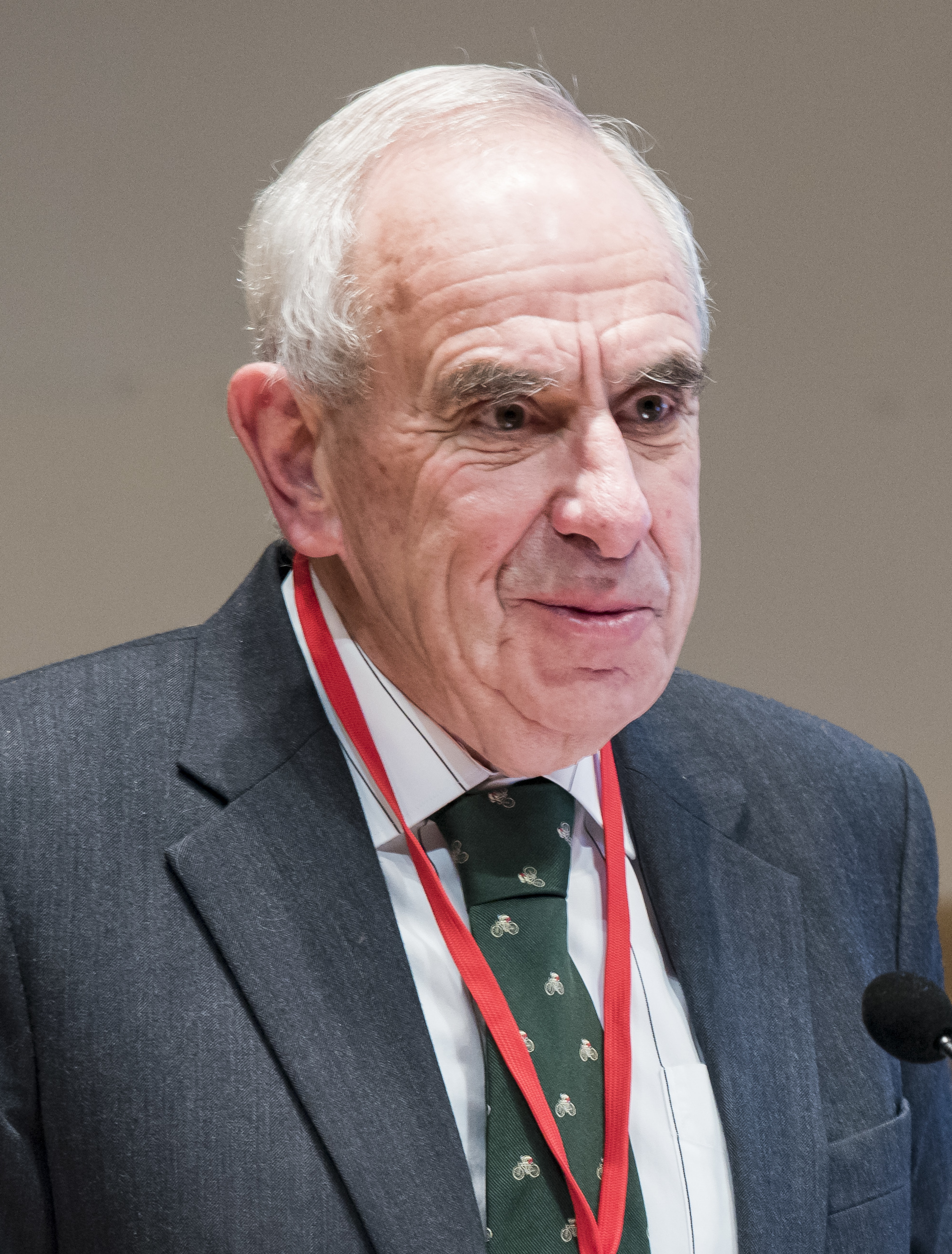
Lord Hoffman, one of the Appellate Committee Lords of Appeal

Lord Hoffman stated that Carson's case was typical of over 400,000 United Kingdom pensioners living abroad in countries which do not have reciprocal treaty arrangements under which annual cost of living increases are payable. Arrangements exist for countries within the European Economic Area (which is made up on European Union countries, Norway, Iceland and Lichtenstein) and a number of other countries such as the United States ("treaty countries"). However, there are no such treaties with South Africa, Australia, New Zealand, Canada and many other countries. ^{para 6}

Carson complained that she was being unfairly treated, since she had paid the same National Insurance] Contributions as a United Kingdom resident and therefore she should receive the same pension. She is supported by associations of expatriate pensioners in South Africa and elsewhere. Whilst the case had generated a good deal of passion. ^{para 7}, Lord Hoffman stated that:

"The sense of grievance may be understandable but it is not justified. There is nothing unfair or irrational regarding the different treatment of people living abroad". ^{para 8}

Lord Hoffman agreed that there was no doubt that Carson was being treated differently compared to a pensioner who has the same contribution record but lived in the United Kingdom or a treaty country, but that in and of itself is not enough to amount to discrimination. ^{para 14} Carson agreed that she could have no complaint if the United Kingdom had rigorously applied the principle that the UK state pension is for UK residents only and not payable to UK pensioners who had moved abroad, or who had, like her, relocated for work purposes. ^{para 19}. Lord Hoffman stated that it was unnecessary for the UK Government to try to justify the sums paid since it distracted attention from the main argument. ^{para 26}

Lord Hoffman dismissed Carson's appeal. ^{para 34}

In Lord Rodger's opinion, the fact that Carson gets less by way of pension does not constitute unlawful discrimination contrary to Article 14. ^{para 44} He dismissed Carson's appeal.

Lord Walker stated that he could understand Carson's dissatisfaction at this state of affairs, but, in his opinion, she was not misled concerning what her entitlement would be. ^{para 71} He believed that this was an issue of macro-economic policy which was within the responsibility of the UK government ^{para 80}, and therefore he dismissed Carson's appeal. ^{para 80}

In Lord Nicholls's opinion, Carson's complaint would need to be specifically covered as a Convention right in Article 14 of the convention (Prohibition of Discrimination) and on a ground stated in article 14. If this was true, then does Carson's difference in treatment, i.e. alleged discrimination stand up to scrutiny? Sometimes, where the position is not so clear, a different approach is called for, in which case the court's scrutiny may best be directed at considering whether the differentiation has a legitimate aim and whether the means chosen to achieve the aim is appropriate and not disproportionate in its adverse impact. ^{para 3} Lord Nicholls had decided this was not the case and dismissed Carson's appeal. ^{para 1}

Lord Carswell had a dissenting opinion. Whilst it had been made clear in the Supreme Court that as far as UK law is concerned the difference in the way different cohorts of pensioners are treated is in accordance with the law, Carson and her fellow "frozen" pensioners can only hope that their appeals to logic and a sense of fair play will eventually prevail, contrary to their experience to date. ^{para 93}

Lord Carswell considered the impact of the European Convention for the Protection of Human Rights and Fundamental Freedoms ("the Convention"), as brought into play by the Human Rights Act 1998 and whether it was unlawful for the Government to operate legislation which has such an effect, ^{para 93} and Carson had been discriminated against. The UK Government maintained that her case could not be compared to other, similar cases, and therefore she had failed to demonstrate discrimination. ^{para 96} Lord Carswell stated that other judgments had missed the fact that Carson's financial position cannot be directly compared with those of pensioners either in the United Kingdom or in other countries, since exchange rates, inflation rates and the cost of living vary between these countries, therefore her case could not be directly compared with theirs and that accordingly she had not been discriminated against. ^{para 96} He stated that:

"A broader approach might more readily yield a serviceable answer which corresponds with one's instincts for justice". ^{para 97}

Lord Carswell stated that Carson and other pensioners who reside in countries in which their pensions are not uprated are unquestionably treated differently, to their disadvantage, by reason of their residence in those countries. It is a fallacy to use variation in exchange rates or the relative cost of living in different countries when comparing Carson, and other "frozen" pensioners compared with pensioners residing in the United Kingdom or in countries where pensions are uprated. That makes little sense. If some of them are not paid pensions at the same rate as others then that would, in his opinion, constitute discrimination for the purposes of Article 14. ^{para 98}

If the UK Government had submitted reasons of economic or state policy to justify the difference in treatment, then Lord Carswell would yield to its decision-making power in those fields. It has not done so. On the contrary, the reasons for the policy lie wholly in the cost of uprating. It is stated in paragraph 11 of the memorandum by the Department of Social Security (DSS) memorandum to the House of Commons Social Security Committee in the session 1996-7:

"Agreeing to additional expenditure on pensions paid overseas would be incompatible with the government's policy of containing the long term cost of the social security system to ensure that it remains affordable". The UK state pension was becoming too expensive to continue paying at the "full rate" to everyone who had paid into the social security system, so the UK Government had to find some means of keeping down the cost, and in so doing, deprived one cohort of pensioners from receiving the annual uprating. ^{para 99}

However, Lord Carswell stated, once the UK Government started uprating the UK state pension for some pensioners living abroad, then there can be no justification for paying some and not others and less than their peers in the UK. ^{para 100}

Lord Carswell therefore allowed the appeal and declared that regulation 3 of the Social Security Benefits Up-rating Regulations 2001 (SI 2001/910) is unlawful. ^{para 104}

=== Reynolds's appeal ===
Lord Hoffman stated that the key issue was whether the UK government had the right to deal with Job Seekers who were under 25 in a different way to those who were over the age of 25. ^{paras 36 & 3'}

Reynolds contended that Job Seekers Allowance and Income Support should be viewed in the same way, since both of them were determined on need, and were not related to lost earnings. With regard to Job Seekers Allowance, rather than the under 25/over 25 age demarcation, Reynolds contended that the legislation would be fairer if the distinction was between householder (of which Reynolds was one) and non-householders, since the expenses of a householder were much higher than those for a non-householder. ^{para 38} The UK government confirmed that initially, the Job Seekers Allowance did have the householder/non-householder split, but this had been substituted with an age qualification instead. ^{para 39} Lord Hoffman stated that, in terms of the Job Seekers Allowance, a line had to be drawn somewhere, and that the UK Government had determined that this line should be an applicant's 25th birthday, even though an applicant's expenses do not change the day that they turned 25. Lord Hoffman therefore dismissed Reynolds's appeal. ^{para 41}

In Lord Rodger's opinion, Reynolds felt that she was discriminated against on the grounds of age, but that the UK government treated the under 25 cohort of Job Seekers Allowance recipients as being in a different class since they will be receiving less, and therefore will have lower costs, and that by paying a lower amount, the UK government was encouraging them to live with others, rather than on their own, in which case there are many costs that could be shared, ^{para 45} and therefore there was no unlawful discrimination under Article 14. He dismissed Reynolds's Appeal.

Lord Walker reviewed the details as to Reynolds's alleged discrimination. ^{para8 81-84} He then reviewed these circumstances against case law as it pertained to Reynolds and he then set out the five reasons that the UK government believed that there was no such age discrimination ^{para 86} - People in the 18-24 age group earn less than those 25 and over; the majority of the "under 25's" do not live on their own, so their cost base is lower; the payment of lower amounts to the "under 25's" discourages them from living independently; there are other social welfare benefits that can be given to those who can prove financial hardship and, the UK government needs simple rules for good administration - the age distinction was easier to apply than those between householder and non-householder.

Lord Walker stated that in Asmundsson v Iceland, ^{paras 89 & 90} there was case law such as to support the distinction between those under 25 and those "25 and over". ^{para 86} It was for the UK Parliament, and not the judiciary, to decide where to draw the demarcation line, and they had decided that is should be done based on age. ^{para 88} Lord Walker therefore dismissed Reynolds's appeal, saying that demarcation lines needed to be "bright lines", and that it was the role of Government to draw them (as the United States Supreme Court had done in the Margia case, ^{para 91} and he therefore dismissed Reynolds's appeal.

Lord Nicholls also dismissed Reynolds's appeal.

Lord Carswell agreed with the other judges with regard to Reynolds's appeal, and dismissed it.

The judgment of the Law Lords was 4 to 1 in favour of the UK government.

Cited as: [2005] 2 WLR 1369, [2006] AC 173, 18 BHRC 677, [2006] 1 AC 173, [2005] UKHL 37, [2005] UKHRR 1185, [2005] HRLR 23, [2005] 4 All ER 545

== Citations ==
Wandsworth London Borough Council v Michalak [2003] 1 WLR 617, 625; R (Carson) v Secretary of State for Work and Pensions [2002] 3 All ER 994; Müller v Austria (1975) 3 DR 25; Gaygusuz v Austria (1997) 23 EHRR 364, 376, 381; Jankovic v Croatia (2000) 30 EHRR CD183; Koua Poirrez v France (2005) 40 EHRR 34, 45; Hepple v United Kingdom (App Nos 65731/01 and 65900/01); Kjeldsen, Busk Madsen and Pedersen v Denmark (1976) 1 EHRR 711, 732–733; R (S) v Chief Constable of the South Yorkshire Police [2004] 1 WLR 2196, 2213; Thlimmenos v Greece (2001) 31 EHRR 411; Van der Mussele v Belgium (1983) 6 EHRR 163, 179–180; Massachusetts Board of Retirement v Murgia (1976) 438 US 285; 427 US 307 Ghaidan v Godin-Mendoza [2004] 2 AC 557, 568, 605; Van der Mussele v Belgium (1983) 6 EHRR 163, 180; Grosz, Beatson and Duffy's Human Rights: The 1998 Act and the European Convention, (2000); Laws LJ, Carson & Anor v Secretary of State for Work and Pensions [2003] EWCA Civ 797; Budak v Turkey (unreported), 7 September 2004 (App No 57345/00); Beale v United Kingdom (unreported), 12 October 2004 (App No 6743/03); San Antonio School District v Rodriguez (1973) 411 US 1, 29; Abdulaziz, Cabales and Balkandali v United Kingdom (1985) 7 EHRR 471, 501; Schmidt v Germany (1994) 18 EHRR 513, 527; Van Raalte v Netherlands (1997) 24 EHRR 503, 518-519; Law of the European Convention on Human Rights,; Jacobs and White, European Law of Human Rights, 3rd ed (2002), pp 355-6, citing Hoffmann v Austria (1994) 17 EHRR 293, 316; Salgueiro da Silva Mouta v Portugal (2001) 31 EHRR 1055, 1071; Stingel v The Queen (1990) 171 CLR 312, 330; Defrenne v Société Anonyme Belge de Navigation Aérienne (Case 43/75) [1976] ECR 455); Human Rights: The 1998 Act and the European Convention (2000); Nasser v United Bank of Kuwait [2002] 1 WLR 1868, 1883; Shamoon v Chief Constable of the Royal Ulster Constabulary [2003] ICR 337; Civil Liberties and Human Rights in England and Wales, 2nd ed (2002); Johnston v Ireland (1986) 9 EHRR 203; R (Williamson) v Secretary of State for Education and Employment [2005] 2 WLR 590, 604; Belgian Linguistic Case (No 2) (1968) 1 EHRR 252, 284; Wessels-Bergervoet v Netherlands (2004) 38 EHRR 793); J W v United Kingdom (1983) 34 DR 153; Corner v United Kingdom (unreported), 17 May 1985 (App No 11271/84) ; Müller v Austria (1975) 3 DR 25; R (ProLife Alliance) v British Broadcasting Corporation [2004] 1 AC 185, 240; James v United Kingdom (1986) 8 EHRR 123, 142; R v Director of Public Prosecutions, Ex p Kebeline [2000] 2 AC 326, 381; Asmundsson v Iceland, App. No. 60669/00, 12 October 2004, para 43;

== See also ==
- UK employment discrimination law
- UK labour law
- Human Rights Act 1998
- Protocol 1 of Article 1 of the European Court of Human Rights
- Article 8 of the European Convention on Human Rights
- Article 14 of the Convention
