= R (Carson) v Secretary of State for Work and Pensions & Another =

- Court: In the High Court of Justice; Queen's Bench Division; Administrative Court
- Full case name: The Queen on the application of Annette Carson (Claimant) and The Secretary of State for Work and Pensions (Defendant) and The Commonwealth of Australia (Intervening Party)
- Decided: May 22, 2002
- Citations: [2002] EWHC 978 (Admin); [2002] 3 All ER 994
- Transcript: BAILII

Case history
- Appealed to: Court of Appeal (Civil Division): Carson & Another v Secretary of State for Work and Pensions [2003] EWCA Civ 797

Court membership
- Judge sitting: The Honourable Mr. Justice Burnton

Keywords
- Right to property Prohibition of discrimination State Pension; Frozen State Pension

R (Carson) v Secretary of State for Work and Pensions & Another [2002] EWHC 978 (Admin) was heard in the Administration Court of the Queen's Bench Division in the High Court of Justice on 22 May 2002 before the Honourable Mr. Justice Burnton.

Annette Carson was the claimant, the Secretary of State for the Department for Work and Pensions (the UK Government) was the defendant and the Commonwealth of Australia was an intervening party.

This was a Human Rights Act 1998 case on the "right to property" under Article 1 of the First Protocol and Prohibition of Discrimination under Article 14 of the European Convention on Human Rights as reflected in UK law.

== Background ==
In April 2002, Carson brought this case before the High Court under the Human Rights Act 1998. Carson had spent most of her working life in the UK, and during that time she kept paying her full National Insurance Contributions (NICs) and UK taxes where applicable. She relocated to South Africa in 1989 for work purposes, and continued paying NICs to ensure that on retirement she would be eligible for the full UK State Pension. This she had started drawing in September 2000. She then realised that the amount she received would not be increased in line with her peers in the UK, and her pension was being "frozen" at the level at which she first started receiving it.

Carson contended that she was being discriminated against with regard to deprivation of the annual inflationary increase to her UK State Pension because she had relocated to South Africa for work purposes ^{para 9}. She had determined that UK pensioners living in some overseas countries received the annual increase, whilst others, like her, were deprived of this annual increase.

Carson also contended that the failure of the UK Government to pay to pensioners resident in certain countries abroad the inflation uprating of their UK State pensions, while paying the annual uprating in other countries, contravened the Human Rights Act 1998 (based on the European Convention on Human Rights) on grounds of discrimination. Annual uprating to the UK State Pension is payable in countries like the UK, the (EEA) and a number of disparate countries (the United States, for example), whilst not being payable in predominantly Commonwealth countries such as Australia, Canada, New Zealand and South Africa.

In addition, Carson contended that this contravened Article 14 of the convention (Prohibition of Discrimination), and also that her state pension, or alternatively its uprating, were "pecuniary rights", and therefore “possessions” within the meaning of Article 1 of the First Protocol of the convention (Protection of Property).

== UK state pension recipients ==
In May 2002, there were 11.1 million pensioners in receipt of a UK state pension - 10.2 million living in the UK and 900,000 who resided abroad. Of those, 418,000 resided in countries where UK pensioners received the annual inflationary increase to their UK state pension, and 482,000 who, like Carson, resided in countries which did not receive the annual increase.

Country Summary	Number of UK Pensioners	Average Weekly Amount Received (GBP) in 2002
United Kingdom	10,228,744	80
Abroad - Not Frozen	417,814	41
Abroad - Frozen	482,019	27
TOTAL:	11,128,577	76

Of the 482,000 pensioners who did not receive the annual increase to their UK State Pension, 465,000 of them resided in just 10 countries - the remaining 17,000 were spread far and wide around the world. The top 10 "Frozen" countries at that time were:

Country	Number of UK Pensioners	Average Weekly Amount Received (GBP) in 2002
Australia	224,263	27
Canada	144,819	24
New Zealand	38,611	28
South Africa	34,978	31
Pakistan	5,917	28
Zimbabwe	4,407	27
India	3,950	28
Republic of Yemen	3,157	31
Bangladesh	3,130	26
Nigeria	1,858	18
TOP 10 Totals:	465,090	27

== Judgment ==
Justice Burnton stated that:

"Very many of the expatriate UK pensioners who do not receive uprated pensions have a strong and understandable sense of grievance......They feel that they have been deprived of an increasingly substantial part of the fruit of their contributions......as a result, they have formed associations to press their cause for equal treatment" ^{para 6}

Carson claimed that she had not been informed that her UK state pension would be "frozen" when she decided to pay her voluntary contributions from South Africa. ^{para 7} and that the failure of the UK Government to pay her the amount of the annual uprating wrongfully deprived her part of her pension and the entirety of the uprating. ^{para 9} The UK Government also claimed that their policy decision not to pay uprating to Carson and others in her position was justified. ^{para 10} The Court believed that there were seven key issues that needed addressing: ^{para 15}

1. Is the state pension or the uprating a possession of Carson within the meaning of Article 1 of the First Protocol?
2. If so, is the failure or refusal of the Government to pay an uprated pension to Carson a deprivation of that possession for the purposes of Article 1 of the First Protocol?
3. If so, is that deprivation justified?
4. If uprating is not a possession for the purposes of Article 1 of the First Protocol, is the payment of uprating to some, but not all, pensioners nonetheless within the scope of Article 14? i.e. does Carson's complaint relate to "the enjoyment of the rights and freedoms set forth in (the) Convention?"
5. If so, what is the criterion applied to determine the differential treatment of pensioners?
6. Is that criterion a ground "such as sex, race, ... or other status" that is, unless objectively justified, prohibited by Article 14?
7. If so, is the differential treatment of Carson's wrongful discrimination in breach of Article 14 as compared with (i) pensioners living in the UK, or (ii) pensioners residing in countries such as the United States where the UK State Pension is uprated?

According to the Third Report (January 1997) of Social Security Committee Report:

It is impossible to discern any pattern behind the selection of countries with whom bilateral agreements have been made providing for uprating. ^{para 30}

The report went on to say:

Surely no one would have deliberately designed a policy of paying pensions to people living abroad intending to end up where we are today....it would be clearly impractical to negotiate bilateral agreements with each of the other countries where people draw British state retirement pensions, and in any case unnecessary; a simple change in British law could enable upratings to be paid in any or all overseas countries provided the political will was there to do so.

On 13 November 2000, Jeff Rooker, Minister of State, said in the House of Commons:

I have already said I am not prepared to defend the logic of the present situation. It is illogical. There is no consistent pattern. It does not matter whether it is in the Commonwealth or outside it. We have arrangements with some Commonwealth countries and not with others. Indeed, there are differences among Caribbean countries. This is an historical issue and the situation has existed for years. ^{para 32}

The UK Government stated that successive governments have limited the annual increase to the UK state pension since the increase is based on economic factors in the UK. At the same time, to pass on the increase to pensioners who have chosen to live in "frozen" countries would mean that to do so would create an additional tax burden of UK taxpayers. ^{para 34}

The United Kingdom is the only OECD country that discriminates between pensioners living in different overseas countries. ^{para 36}

In Corner (App. No. 11271/84), the European Commission rejected as manifestly ill-founded the complaint that the failure to pay uprating infringed Article 1 of the First Protocol and Article 14. In Justice Burnton's opinion, this case in and of itself was enough to rule in the Government's favour. ^{para 43} Justice Burnton also stated:

"...a government may lawfully decide to restrict the payment of benefits of any kind to those who are within its territorial jurisdiction, leaving the care and support of those who live elsewhere to the governments of the countries in which they live. Such a restriction may be based wholly or partly on considerations of cost, but having regard to the wide margin of discretion that must be accorded to the government, I do not think it one that a court may say is unreasonable or lacking in objective justification". ^{para 73}

Justice Burnton concluded that the remedy to the "frozen" UK state pension annual increase issue was a political decision and not a judicial one, and, as a result, he dismissed the application, and found in favour of the UK Government. Costs were awarded against Carson, be she was given leave to appeal. ^{paras 76 & 77}

On 22 June 2002, the "frozen" pensions issue was raised in the House of Lords, and there was reference to the Carson case.

This case evoked emotions around the world, with some writing to the UK Parliament in protest.

== Citations ==
Gaygusuz v Austria (1996) 23 EHRLR 230; Bennion, Statutory Interpretation, 3rd edition, at section 106, page 252; Air Canada v UK (1995) 20 EHRR 150; Drozd and Janousek v France and Spain (1992) 14 EHRR 745; Bankovic and ors v Belgium and others (App. no. 52207/99); Ryan v Liverpool Health Authority [2002] Lloyd's Rep Med 23; Bell v Todd [2002] Lloyd's Rep Med 12; Hooper and ors v Secretary of State for Work and Pensions [2002] EWHC 191 (Admin); The Queen on the application of Reynolds v Secretary of State for Work and Pensions [2002] EWHC 426 (Admin); Alconbury [2001] 2WLR 1389; Müller v Austria (App. No. 5849/72, Comm. Report 1.10.75, 73 DR 19); T v Sweden (App. No. 10671/83) (1986) EHRR 269; X v Italy (App. No. 7459/76); JW and EW v UK (App. No. 9776/82); Corner (App. No. 11271/84); Skorkiewicz, Coke and Bellet v France (App. no. 4083332/98; Walden v Liechtenstein (Decision no. 33916/96); Shackell v UK (App No. 4585/99); Matthews v United Kingdom (App. No. 40302/98); Jankovic v Croatia Dec. no. 43440/98; Michalak v London Borough of Wandsworth [2002] EWCA Civ 271; Human Rights: The 1998 Act and the European Convention (2000); P v UK (App. No. 14751/89); Nelson v United Kingdom (App. No. 11077/84); Murray v United Kingdom (1996) 22 EHRR 29; Darby v Sweden (1991) 13 EHRR 774; Havard (App. No. 38882/97); Kebilene [2000] 2 AC 326; Waite v London Borough of Hammersmith & Fulham and another [2002] EWCA Civ 482; Steele Ford & Newton v CPS [1994]; Blackburn v Attorney-General [1971] 1 WLR 1037; J H Rayner (Mincing Lane) Ltd v Department of Trade and Industry [1990] 2 AC 418; Brunswick (Duke of) v. King of Hanover (1844) 6 Beav. 1; (1848) 2 H.L. Cas. 1, H.L. (E.); Mellacher v Austria [1989] 12 EHRR 391; R (Smeaton) v Secretary of State for Health [2002] EWHC 886 (Admin).

== See also ==
- Human Rights Act 1998
- Protocol 1 of Article 1 of the European Convention on Human Rights
- Article 14 of the same Convention
