= Carson & Another v Secretary of State for Work and Pensions =

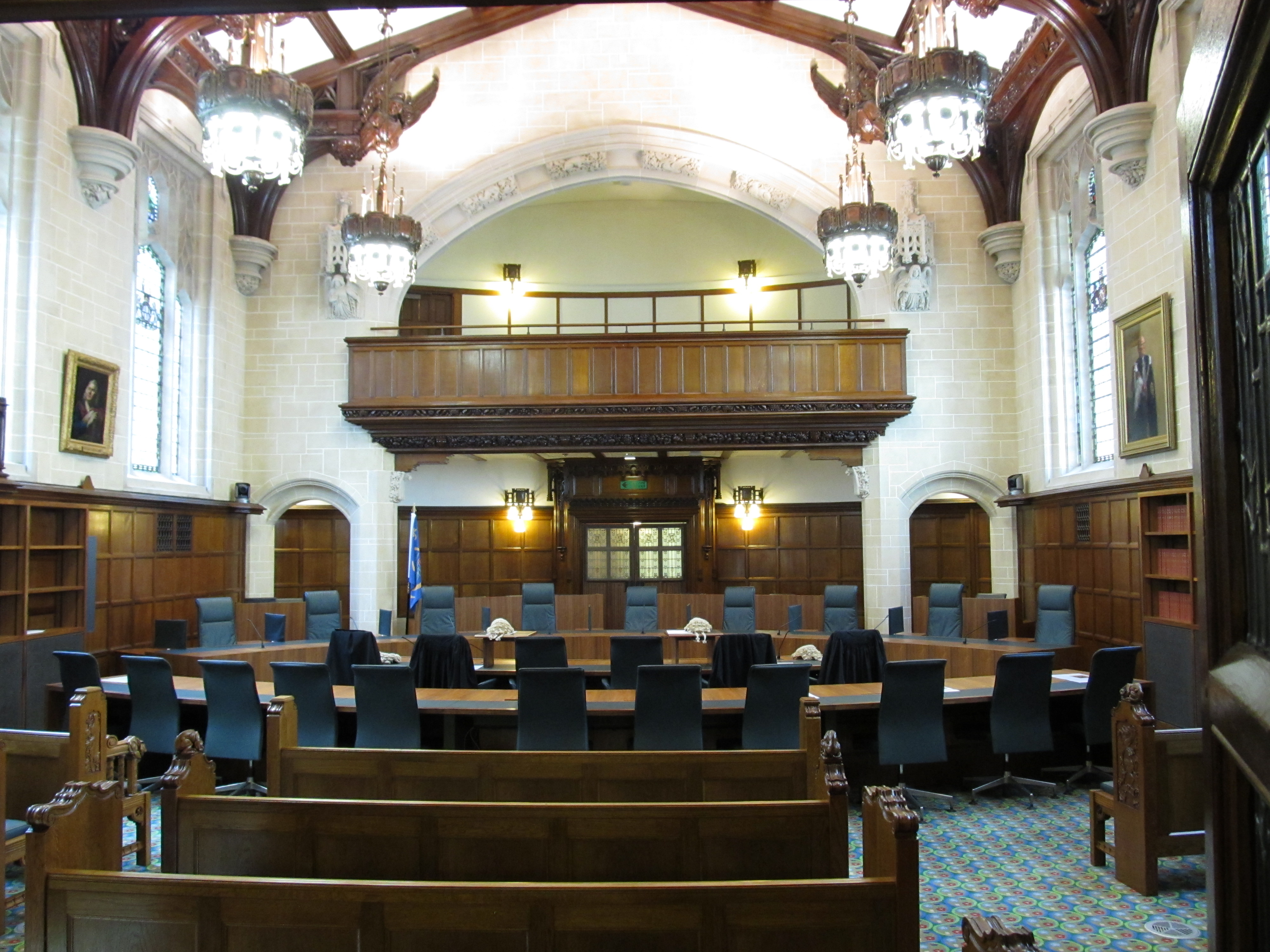
- UK Supreme Court
- Court: Court of Appeal (Civil Division) in the Supreme Court
- Full case name: Carson and Reynolds (Claimants) and The Secretary of State of the Department for Work and Pensions (Respondent)
- Decided: June 17, 2003

Case history
- Appealed from: In the High Court of Justice; Queen's Bench Division; Administrative Court
- Appealed to: Lords of Appeal in the House of Lords - Opinions of the Lords of Appeal

Case opinions
- Decision by: Lord Justice Simon Brown, Lord Justice Laws, and Lord Justice Rix
- Concurrence: All three Judges concurred with the decision

Keywords
- Right to property; Prohibition of discrimination; Right to respect for private and family life; Jobseeker's Allowance; Income Support; State Pension; Frozen State Pension

Carson & Another v Secretary of State for Work and Pensions [2003] EWCA Civ 797 was heard in the Court of Appeal (Civil Division) in the Supreme Court on 17 June 2003 before Lord Justice Brown, Lord Justice Laws, and Lord Justice Rix.

Two separate High Court cases were brought together for the purposes of this appeal: R (Carson) v Secretary of State for Work and Pensions & Another, from the Administration Court of the Queens Bench Division of the High Court of Justice in England and Wales before The Honourable Mr. Justice Burnton, and R (Reynolds) v Secretary of State for Work and Pensions, from the Administration Court of the Queen's Bench Division of the High Court of Justice in England and Wales before Mr. Justice Wilson.

The two litigants in this case were Annette Carson and Joanne Reynolds.

This case was a UK labour law and Human Rights Act 1998 case on "right to property" under Article 1 of the First Protocol (Protection of Property) and Article 14 of the convention (Prohibition of Discrimination). In Reynolds's case, there was also Article 8 – the right to respect for "private and family life" to consider.

== Background ==
Carson contended that the failure of the UK Government to pay the annual inflationary increase to the UK State Pension in some countries but not others contravened the European Convention on Human Rights (ECHR) and that she and many others were being discriminated against. She had found that the annual increase to the UK State Pension is payable in countries like the UK, the European Economic Area (EEA) and a number of disparate countries (the United States, for example), whilst not being payable in predominantly Commonwealth countries such as Australia, Canada, New Zealand and South Africa. Carson claimed that under Article 1 her state pension, or alternatively its uprating, are "pecuniary rights", and therefore “possessions” within the meaning of Article 1 of the First Protocol and Article 14. In her original case, Justice Burnton had found in favour of the UK Government, citing that the judiciary should not override legislative UK government policy.

Reynolds was born on 9 November 1976. When she left school she began work and continued to work until she was made redundant on 12 October 2000. Whilst she was working she paid National Insurance Contributions. On 24 October 2000 she applied for Jobseeker's Allowance and it was paid with effect from that date. There are two different types of Jobseeker's Allowance - “JSA(C)” which is based on National Insurance Contributions paid over a prescribed minimum period and is not means-tested - the other “JSA(IB)” is income-based and a Means-tested benefit. Reynolds was paid the lesser of the two amounts and therefore was taking civil action against the UK Government saying that the UK Government's action was incompatible with Article 1 of the First Protocol to the convention; and under Article 14 of the convention she claimed she was being discriminated against because of her age; and under Article 8 of the ECHR (respect for her private life and her home); and finally her right not to be subjected to degrading treatment under Article 3 of ECHR (the prohibition of torture, and "inhuman or degrading treatment or punishment").

Reynolds could not return to work so instead of receiving the Job Seeker's Allowance she received Income Support which continued to be paid to her. She was under 25 at the time and lived in social housing. She received £41.35 a week and if she was over 25 she would have received £52.20 per week. The UK Government said that 18- to 24-year-olds earn less and mostly do not live independently. They should be discouraged from living independently and there is welfare support for this group in other ways.

== Judgment ==
=== Carson ===
Carson contended that Regulation 3 of the Social Security Benefits Uprating Regulation was "repugnant" to Article 14 of the Convention in conjunction with Article 1P because it discriminated against her based on the fact that she had relocated to South Africa for work purposes. ^{para 15} In addition, it was beyond the powers of this Regulation in violation of Article 14 read in conjunction with Article 1P because it discriminated against Carson on grounds of her "place of residence" without any "objective and reasonable justification". The Regulation also constituted a violation of Article 1P taken on its own.

The UK Government claimed that, in the original hearing, Justice Burnton should have dismissed the case from the beginning, since there was certain evidence that should not have been introduced in regard to Article 1: "a signatory State is only obliged to secure the Convention rights for the benefit of persons residing within its territorial jurisdiction". However, Justice Burnton had stated that Article 1 did not operate so as to bar Carson's claim.

The UK Government stated that it would cost at least a £100 million to uprate the state pension universally, that this would have to come out of general taxation, and would deprive pensioners living in the UK from future increases because there would be no funds available which the court accepted. However, Carson contended that "cost should not constitute a legitimate justification". ^{paras 70 & 71}

Lord Justice Laws concluded that Article 1P on its own, had not been violated. ^{para 23}, and in his opinion the most important aspect was whether Article 14 read with Article 1P was violated. ^{para 16} He concluded, based on the facts of the case, that he could not see how any exercise of Article 1P right was involved such as might engage Article 14. ^{para 33}

Lord Justice Laws then considered Article 14 read with Article 1 of the First Protocol, with regard to Carson's "place of residence", and in that aspect, he was not convinced that there was any discrimination at all.

Looking at Article 14 on its own, Carson was asked if they could find a similar cohort of pensioners to her where they were given the annual uprating and thereby showing that she was being discriminated against. Carson identified two such groups: ^{para 51} - namely, pensioners, who like Carson lived abroad, but in countries where the annual uprating was being paid, and pensioners living in the UK, all of whom are paid the annual uprating to their UK state pension.

The UK Government's position had always been:

Successive Governments have taken the view that the level of increases in retirement pensions relates to conditions in the UK and that it would not be right to impose an additional burden on contributors and taxpayers in the UK in order to pay pension increases to people who have chosen to become resident elsewhere in the world....motions to pay the annual uprating to Carson (and others in her position) were submitted to both Houses of Parliament in June and July 1995 during the passage of the Pensions Bill, which called for uprating to be paid. All were defeated by large majorities. ^{para 52}

The UK only uprates the state pension where there is a legal liability to do so - this includes all UK pensioners living in the UK, the EEA, and a number of other countries where there are bilateral social security agreements in place, Whilst there are bilateral agreements with Australia (1953), New Zealand (1956) and Canada (1959), they did not include the uprating of the UK state pension. Australia cancelled its agreement with the UK in 2001 because the UK Government would not uprate the State Pension for those UK pensioners who had emigrated to Australia. This was not an issue when the UK joined the EEC since bilateral agreements were in place for all of the EEC countries except Denmark. These bilateral agreements did facilitate the uprating of the UK State Pension. ^{para 53}

Lord Justice Laws conceded that the current situation was "haphazard", quoting statements made by the UK Minister of State Jeff Rooker on 13 November 2000:

"I have already said I am not prepared to defend the logic of the present situation. It is illogical. There is no consistent pattern. It does not matter whether it is in the Commonwealth or outside it. We have arrangements with some Commonwealth countries and not with others. Indeed, there are differences among Caribbean countries. This is an historical issue and the situation has existed for years. It would cost some £300 million to change the policy for all concerned ...". ^{para 54} Lord Justice Laws concluded that the UK Government would not need to create new bilateral agreements in order to uprate the State Pension universally. ^{para 66} However, giving the "annual uprating", or taking it away is entirely a rightful decision by the UK Government. ^{para 67} Based on literature produced by the DSS, Carson had no right to expect her State Pension to be uprated, given her decision to relocate to South Africa for work purposes. ^{para 68} Lord Justice Laws referred to R v DPP, ex p. Kebilene. ^{para 73}

In some circumstances it will be appropriate for the courts to recognize that there is an area of judgment within which the judiciary will defer, on democratic grounds, to the considered opinion of the elected body or person whose act or decision is said to be incompatible with the Convention.

Lord Justice Laws dismissed Carson's appeal, and he quoted from Corner v United Kingdom (Application No. 11271/84, decision of 17 May 1985, unpublished): ^{para 74}

The Commission has held that the 'freezing' of a pension at a particular level when a person leaves the United Kingdom does not amount to a deprivation of possessions infringing Article 1 of the Protocol. (Dec. No. 9776/82, 10.83 to be published in D.R. 34). Moreover, the different treatment of persons entitled to pensions who remain in the country of payment compared with those who emigrate is justified on the grounds that the applicant will only lose the benefit of future increases in the pension, whose purpose broadly speaking is to compensate for rises in the cost of living in the United Kingdom and which the applicant will not have to endure (Dec. No. 9776/82, loc. cit.). The Commission also considers that the economic state of third countries is not a matter which domestic pension authorities should be obliged to consider.

=== Reynolds ===
Reynolds had been given leave to appeal on a limited basis. There were no grounds to support her case regarding Articles 3, 8 or Article 1P, but taking Article 14 with Article 1P, she may have a supportable case for arbitrary discrimination. ^{para 14}. Justice Laws determined that "income support" did constitute a "possession" as far as Article 1P was concerned. ^{para 17}

With regard to Article 14 read with Article 8, Lord Justice Laws believed that no argument could be made to support Reynolds' claim when taking these two Articles together. ^{para 29} The next question he considered was whether Income Support was a "possession" with regard to Article 1P for the purpose of Article 14. ^{para 30}, and he concluded that Article 1P on its own, had not been violated. ^{para 23}

Lord Justice Laws then considered Article 14 read with Article 1 of the First Protocol, with regard to Reynolds's claim of age discrimination ^{para 30}

Lord Justice Laws then determined that there had been a violation of Article 14 taken with Article 1P but only as far as the Job Seekers Allowance" was concerned. With respect to "income support", there was no violation. ^{paras 38-49}

Lord Justice Laws dismissed Reynold's appeal because "in my view, the Secretary of State has demonstrated a perfectly reasonable justification for the differential payments of Job Seeker's Allowance."

=== Carson and Reynolds ===
In Lord Justice Law's opinion with both of the appeals, the most important aspect was whether Article 14 read with Article 1P was violated. ^{para 16}

The UK Government argued that Article 1P only applies to a person's existing possessions, and that it does not include the right to "acquire" possessions at a future date. In addition they also contended, that the amount of the benefit "cannot constitute an interference with the right given by Article1P, rather it merely defines the property right". This position has been consistently supported by the courts in the European Union. ^{paras 18 & 19}

If Carson was not discriminated based on her "place of residence" and Reynolds was not discriminated against based on her age, was there an objective and reasonable justification for such discrimination?

Lord Justice Rix agreed with Lord Justice Laws, in dismissing both appeals, as did Lord Justice Brown, and leave was not given to appeal to the House of Lords refused.

On 17 July 2003, Carson was given leave to appeal to the House of Lords.

Cited as: [2003] 3 All ER 577, [2003] HRLR 36, [2003]EWCA Civ 797

== Citations ==
Marckx v Belgium [1979] 2 EHRR 330; Muller (1975) 3 DR 25; X v Italy (Application No 7459/76); JW and EW v UK (Application No 9776/82); Corner (Application No 11271/84; Gaygusuz v Austria (1996) 23 EHRR 364; Szrabjer and Clarke v UK (October 1997: Applications 27004/95 and 27011/95); Willis v UK (June 2002: Application No 36042/97); Carlin v UK (December 1997: Application No 27537/95); Chapman v UK (2001) 33 EHRR 18; Vaughan v UK (1987) Application No 12639/87; Anderson and Kullmann v Sweden 46 DR 251; Petrovic v Austria [2001] 33 EHRR 14, paragraph 26; Abdulaziz & ors v UK (1985) 7 EHRR 471, paragraph 67; Belgian Linguistics (No 2) (1968) 1 EHRR 252, 283; Botta v Italy (1998) 26 EHRR 241, paragraph 34; Walden v Liechtenstein (2000: Application No 33916/91); Matthews v UK (2000: Application No 40302/98); Shackell v UK (2000: Application No 4851/99); R. (Alconbury Developments Ltd) v Secretary of State for the Environment [2001] 2 WLR 1389; Jankovic v Croatia (2000) Application No 43440/98; Wessels-Bergervoet v Netherlands (Application No 34462/97)); Szrabjer & Clarke v UK (Applications Nos 27004/95 and 27011/95); Belgian Police v Belgium 1 EHRR 578, 590 – 591 (paragraph 38); Michalak v London Borough of Wandsworth [2003]1 WLR 617 (paragraph 20); Human Rights: The 1998 Act and the European Convention (2000); Aston Cantlow v Wallbank [2002] Ch 51; Stubbings v United Kingdom (1996) 23 EHRR 213, 238; Nasser v United Bank of Kuwait [2001] EWCA Civ 556 at [56], [2002] 1 AER 401; Moustaquim 13 EHRR 801; Schaffter [1987] IRLR 53; Mendoza [2002] EWCA Civ 1533; Prolife [2003] UKHL 23; Sporrong & Lonnroth (1982) 5 EHRR 35; James v UK (1986) 8 EHRR 123; R v DPP, ex p. Kebilene [2000] 2 AC 326;
