= Guardian's allowance =

UK Social Security payment

Guardian's allowance is a payment under the United Kingdom system of Social Security.

== History ==
Guardian's Allowance was introduced in 1946 in order to replace the orphan's pension payable under the Widow's Orphans and Old Age Contributory Pensions Act 1925.

== Entitlement ==
It is paid to people looking after children who are effectively orphans, either because both their parents are dead or because one is dead and the other at the time of the death was lost, confined to a hospital by court order or sentenced to more than two years imprisonment. The claimant need not be the child's legal guardian to claim. Those who don't qualify but are looking after someone else's child may be able to get a fostering allowance from the local Social Services department.

Amount: £15.90 per week for each child. Not taxable. It continues while the child qualifies for Child Benefit.

Excluded groups: Step-parents do not count as parents so they can claim, but adoptive parents do, so they can't.

Residence requirements: At least one of the parents must have been born in the UK and spent at least one year in any two-year period here since they were 16.

Effect on other benefits: Does not counts as income for most Means-tested benefits. You cannot claim an increase of another National Insurance benefit for a child as a dependant and claim Guardian's allowance for the same child.
