= Frozen Occupational Pension =

A frozen occupational pension (or a preserved pension) is one which has been left behind in an occupational pension scheme by people no longer employed by the sponsoring employer. These pensions are "frozen" until retirement age.

This does not mean that the pension is fixed in money terms. In money purchase schemes, the benefit will continue to grow in line with underlying investments.

In defined benefit schemes, the pension will increase in face value based on whatever uprating factor the scheme uses for preserved pensions. Normally, this should be the same as is applied to accruing pensions of current members.

Frequently, if the amounts are small, the member and the scheme administrators lose touch with each other, and as a result the pension is never claimed.

Many financial services advisors and companies offer to collect frozen pensions so as to amalgamate them and bring them under one paying agency.

== See also ==
- Pensions Act 1995
- Frozen pension
