= Child's Special Allowance =

Payment under the United Kingdom system of Social Security

Child's Special Allowance was a payment under the United Kingdom system of Social Security.

It was instituted by Harold Macmillan in 1959 for the orphaned children of divorced parents,

It was a contributory non-means-tested benefit, paid in addition to child benefit to a divorced woman whose husband had died, whose ex-partner had been paying maintenance and who had not got a new partner. It was not taxable, but was taken into account for means-tested benefits.

It was abolished, as far as new claims were concerned, in April 1987. At that point it was paid at a rate of £8.05 per eligible child. Payments continued for existing beneficiaries under the scheme of transitional protection.
