= National Insurance Fund =

British government account for social security

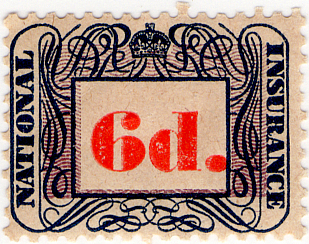
A British 1948 National Insurance stamp, once used to collect contributions to the scheme.

The three British National Insurance Funds hold the contributions of the National Insurance Scheme, set up by the Government of the United Kingdom in 1911. It was reformed in 1948 and assumed broadly its current form in 1975, when the separate National Insurance (Industrial Injuries) and National Insurance (Reserve) Funds were merged with it. In the Beveridge Report this was the basis of a universal insurance system for all British people. "first and foremost a plan of insurance – of giving in return for contributions benefits up to subsistence levels, as of right and without means test, so that individuals may build freely upon it".

There are the National Insurance Fund of the United Kingdom, for Great Britain (England and Wales and Scotland), the National Insurance Fund of Northern Ireland, and the Isle of Man National Insurance Fund.

== Overview ==
The money is held in the National Insurance Fund (NIF), separate from the Consolidated Fund. The income of the NIF consist of contributions from employees, employers and the self-employed, plus interest on its investments. The NIF are used to pay for social security benefits such as state retirement pensions, but not for the means tested Pension Credit and Tax Credits.

National Insurance contributions also provide a small part of the funding for the public healthcare systems in the UK (including the National Health Service in England), but contributions are paid into the funds net of money allocated to the NHS. Thus the NIF do not hold money directed for the general provision of health services in the United Kingdom. The government determines the total allocation for health each year and the allocation from each class contribution is calculated by the Government Actuary.

== Surplus ==
The Great Britain NIF had a surplus of over £34 billion as at 2005/06, £38 billion in 2006/07 and the Government Actuary's Department forecast that this surplus would grow to over £114.7 billion by 2012. This surplus figure was revised due to errors in assumptions by the GAD and was forecast to be just £30 billion by 2016.

The surplus is loaned to the government through the Debt Management Office (which is part of the Commissioners for the Reduction of the National Debt), via instruments termed 'Call Notice Deposits'. Previously it was just invested in gilt-edged securities. Interest on the 'Call Notice Deposits' is paid back into the NIF – around £1.3 billion in the 2007/08 year.

The balance in the National Insurance Funds can be seen on the website of the Debt Management Office.

Levels of benefit and contributions are set following the advice of the Government Actuary, who recommends that a prudential balance of two months contribution revenue (about £8 billion) should be kept in the fund.

== See also ==
- Frozen Occupational Pension
