= Bernard Rix =

English lawyer

The Right Honourable Sir Bernard Rix

Lord Justice of Appeal
- In office 2000–2013

Justice of the High Court
- In office 1993–2000

Sir Bernard Anthony Rix (born 8 December 1944) is a former English judge, who was a Lord Justice of Appeal from 2000 to 2013.

== Family ==
Rix is the son of Otto Rix and Sadie Silverberg. In 1983, he married Karen Young (now The Hon. Lady Rix), daughter of David Young, later Baron Young of Graffham; they have two daughters and three sons.

== Education ==
Rix was educated at St Paul's School in London. He went on to New College, Oxford, where he read Classics until 1966 and Jurisprudence with Senior Status until 1968, graduating MA. He also represented the university at fencing. He was elected a Kennedy Scholar in 1968 and studied at Harvard Law School, where he was awarded an LLM in 1969.

== Legal career ==
Rix was called to the bar at Inner Temple in 1970 (bencher 1990) and became a Queen's Counsel in 1981. He was a member of the Senate of the Inns of Court and Bar between 1981 and 1983. He was also a member of the Bar Council from 1981 to 1983 and was Treasurer of Inner Temple in 2005.

He was a Recorder of the Crown Court from 1990 to 1993. On 26 July 1993, Rix was appointed a High Court judge, receiving the customary knighthood, and assigned to the Queen's Bench Division. From 1998 to 1999, he served as judge in charge of Commercial List. He was made a Lord Justice of Appeal on 2 May 2000 and retired on 10 May 2013.

He was appointed as an International Judge of the Singapore International Commercial Court on 5 January 2015.

Rix has also been the president of the Harvard Law School Association of the UK since 2002, vice-president of the British Friends of Bar Ilan University since 1999, member of the board of trustees of Bar Ilan University from 1988 to 1999, chairman of the Commercial Bar Association from 1992 to 1993, and the vice-chairman of the Central Council for Jewish Community Services from 1993 to 1996. He wrote a report on youth services and organizations in 1994.

In November 2007, Rix controversially overturned life sentences awarded to two Cheshire teenagers who terrorized a vulnerable man before beating him to death and throwing his body in a river.

== Personal life ==
Since 1986, Rix has also been a director of the London Philharmonic Orchestra. He ran the Spiro Institute from 1995 to 1999.

In his spare time, Rix enjoys music, opera, fencing and Italian culture. Rix also is renowned for a fine collection of ancient glass, including medieval and Roman goblets.

== See also ==
- List of British Jews
