= Stanley Burnton =

British lawyer and judge (born 1942)

The Right Honourable Sir Stanley Burnton

Lord Justice of Appeal
- In office 2008–2012

Justice of the High Court
- In office 2000–2008

Personal details
- Born: Stanley Jeffrey Burnton

Sir Stanley Jeffrey Burnton (born 25 October 1942) is a British lawyer and former Lord Justice of Appeal.

== Early life ==
Burnton was educated at Hackney Downs Grammar School. He studied jurisprudence at St Edmund Hall, Oxford, and graduated from the University of Oxford 1964 with a first class Bachelor of Arts (BA) degree.

== Legal career ==
Burnton was called to the bar (Middle Temple) in 1965 and was made a Bencher in 1991. He was appointed as Queen's Counsel in 1982, and was a Recorder from 1994 to 2000.

Burnton was appointed a High Court judge on 19 July 2000, receiving the customary knighthood, and assigned to the Queen's Bench Division. He was promoted, being named a Lord Justice of Appeal on 21 April 2008. He stepped down as a judge in 2012.

On 4 November 2015, Burnton was appointed as the Interception of Communications Commissioner.

== Honours ==
Burnton is an Honorary Fellow of St Edmund Hall, Oxford.
