= Annette Carson =

British non-fiction writer and biographer (born 1940)

Annette J. Carson
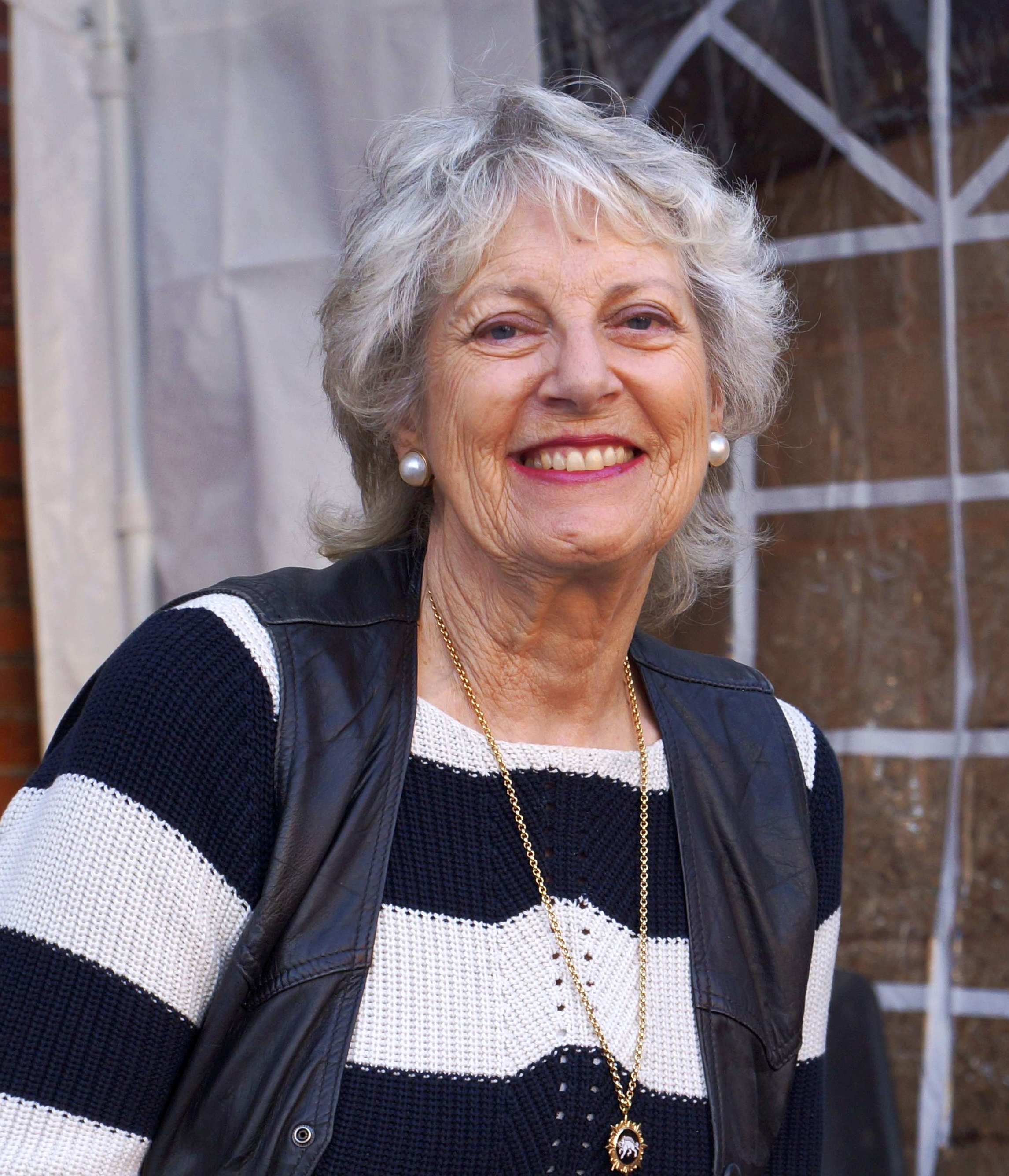
- Carson in 2012
- Born: Annette Josephine Groombridge; 1 September 1940 (age 86); Brighton, England
- Education: Mary Datchelor Girls’ School, London; Royal College of Music
- Occupation: Non-fiction writer
- Spouse: Paul Carson (m. 1960; div. 1966)
- Writing career
- Genres: History, biography, rock music
- Subjects: Aerobatics, Jeff Beck, Richard III
- Notable work: Richard III: The Maligned King
- Website: annettecarson.com

Annette Josephine Carson is a British non-fiction author specialising in history, biography and aviation, with a particular interest in King Richard III. Since 2002 she has also been an advocate for UK state pension parity for UK expatriates.

== Early life ==
Born 1 September 1940 in Brighton, England, Carson is the only daughter of Harry Groombridge, musician and bandleader who died in 1960. She was educated at Mary Datchelor Girls’ School in London and the Royal College of Music where she studied violin with Alan Loveday. In 1960, she married US actor Robert Allen Carson (aka Paul Carson); the marriage was dissolved in 1966.

== Career ==
=== Aviation and aerobatics ===
In the 1980s Carson was British delegate to the Aerobatics Commission (CIVA) of the Fédération Aéronautique Internationale (FAI), and was elected secretary of CIVA and chairman of its Judging Sub-Committee. She served in organisational roles including contest director, British team manager and international jury member. In 1984 she co-wrote (with Eric Müller) Flight Unlimited. In 1986 Carson published Flight Fantastic: The Illustrated History of Aerobatics, earning the FAI's Paul Tissandier Diploma. In 1998, Carson contributed articles to Encyclopaedia Britannica on Aerobatics and Stunt Flying. In September 2019 Carson published a new aviation biography Camel Pilot Supreme: Captain D V Armstrong DFC, with Pilot magazine critic Philip Whiteman called it "deeply researched, hugely informative".

Carson was awarded with the 2019 Thornton D. Hooper Award for Excellence in Aviation History by the readers of Over the Front, the journal of the League of World War 1 Aviation Historians.

=== PR and advertising ===
Carson was a booking agent during Jeff Beck’s rise to fame with the Yardbirds, and during her 20-year career in the entertainment industry she worked at the Royal Academy of Dramatic Art (RADA), at Equity, and for Thames TV.

Carson subsequently freelanced while producing the biographical work Jeff Beck: Crazy Fingers, published in the US in 2001. Q-Magazine critic Michael Leonard called it "The finest and probably final word".

In 1989 Carson relocated to work in Johannesburg, South Africa as a copywriter at Ogilvy & Mather, Grey Response, D’Arcy Direct and Bates International, winning several local and international awards, including a 1991 SPADA (South Africa); a 1992 DMA International Gold Echo; and a 1997 DMA International Silver Echo.

=== Books on King Richard III ===
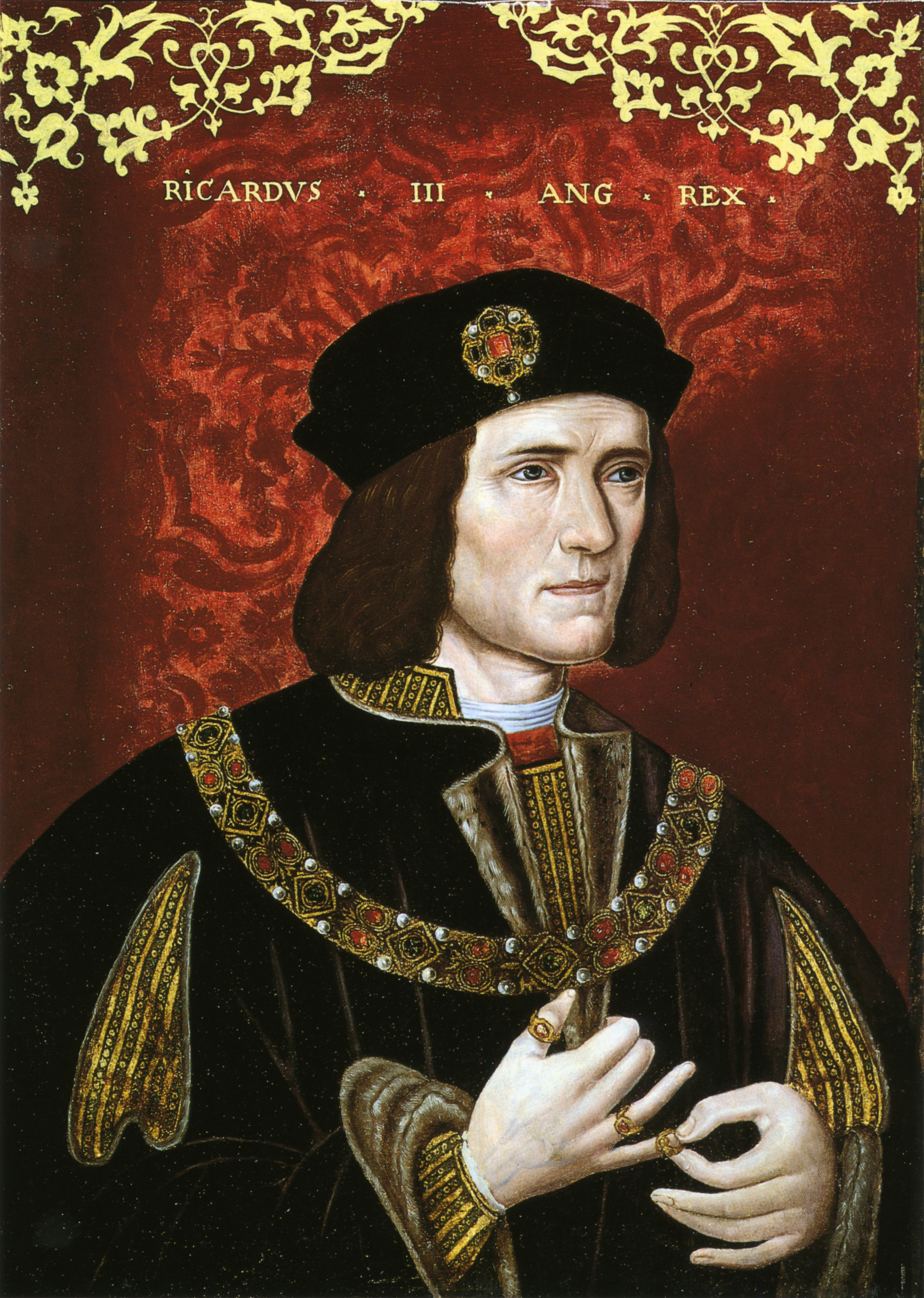
Richard III

With a lifelong interest in King Richard III of England, Carson published Richard III: The Maligned King (2008, 2009, 2013, 2017, 2023), a revisionist analysis of his reign based on non-Tudor sources. Carson concluded that the King's remains still lay under the Greyfriars Church in Leicester where he was originally buried and that the site ‘would now probably lie beneath the private car park of the Department of Social Services’ ^{editions of 2008, 2009, pp. 269-270}.

Her biographical work includes several books on King Richard III of England,. While she was still in South Africa, the search for the king's grave was initiated in the UK by the Looking For Richard Project, and following her return in 2011 Carson was invited to join the Project as historical consultant. The Project's aim was to Exhumation and reburial of Richard III of England find the lost grave of Richard III and give dignified reburial to his mortal remains. This meant excavating the same Social Services car park that Carson had written about. Of Richard III: The Maligned King, Philippa Langley, who had founded the Looking for Richard Project said that ‘It was the first book I had read to make this claim.’. As well as being historical consultant, Carson contributed to the Project's scripting and copywriting, and produced the International Appeal that saved the dig from a £10,000 shortfall.

In 2013 after revising The Maligned King Carson published Richard III: A Small Guide to the Great Debate. In 2014 members of the Looking For Richard Project collaborated to produce a report of their research, edited and published by Carson, entitled Finding Richard III: The Official Account of Research by the Retrieval and Reburial Project. In 2014 Carson was awarded Honorary Life Membership and is now a Fellow of the Richard III Society.

In 2015 Carson published her fourth Ricardian book, Richard Duke of Gloucester as Lord Protector and High Constable of England, with Ken Hillier saying in the Ricardian Bulletin: "A compelling narrative".

Carson then produced a new edition of the seminal Latin text by Dominic Mancini describing the accession of Richard III in 1483: "Domenico Mancini de occupatione regni Anglie" with new English translation, analytical Introduction and full Historical Notes. This was hailed by Matthew Lewis, chair of the Richard III Society, as a fresh look at a vital source. He went on to say: "Annette Carson has undertaken a mammoth task in retranslating Mancini's account of the controversial events of 1483 between the death of Edward IV and accession of Richard III. The previous translation had been criticised for the way certain words and phrases were selectively translated to fit the prevailing understanding of the events in the 1930's. Carson has gone back to basics and removed such weighting." In February 2026 she published her sixth Ricardian book, "Richard III Unspun". All her Ricardian books are available in ebook form.

Requested by Dr Arthur Kincaid during his terminal illness, to assist in publishing his new edition of Sir George Buc's 1619 text The History of King Richard the Third, Carson secured posthumous publication by the Society of Antiquaries (2023), underwritten by The Richard III Society; her contribution included editing, corrections, indexing and project management

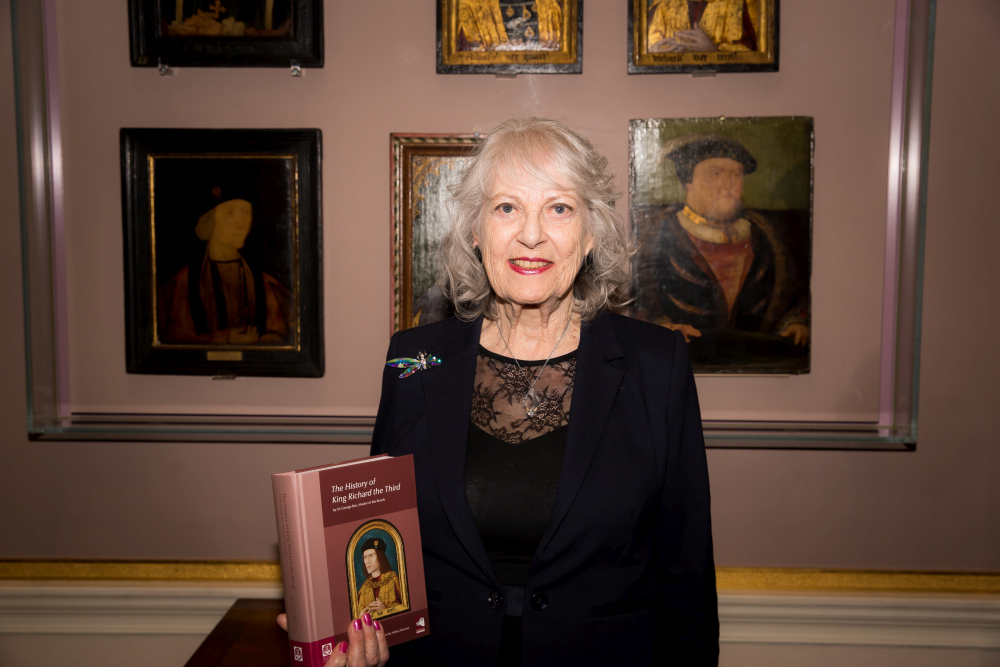
Annette Carson at the book launch of The History of Richard The Third by Arthur Kincaid

Articles by Carson have been published in magazines including the Richard III Society's Ricardian Bulletin, and twice in the society's annual journal The Ricardian, in 2005 and 2012.

Her media appearances include BBC Radio 4 Great Lives: Richard III (2015), and a news item University of Leicester find human remains in car park in search for Richard III. Carson states: "It's my belief we simply don't know as much as we're led to think we know about Richard III and his period, and an open mind serves us better than one that runs along well-worn paths."

== UK State Pension legal challenge ==
In 2002 Carson brought a legal action against the UK Government seeking Judicial review of its 'frozen pension' policy. The case contended that the failure of the UK Government to pay to pensioners resident in certain overseas countries the annual inflation uprating to their UK State Pension, which was paid to residents in other countries, constituted discrimination in contravention of the Human Rights Act 1998 based on EU Human Rights legislation. The UK State Pension was payable in countries like the UK, the European Economic Area (EEA) and a number of disparate countries (the United States, for example), whilst not being payable in predominantly Commonwealth countries such as Australia, Canada, New Zealand and South Africa. The civil action was held in the Administration Court of the Queens Bench Division of the High Court. Carson lost her case, with the Honourable Mr. Justice Burnton saying that the decision to uprate the UK State Pension was legislative rather than judicial. Carson was given leave to appeal, and the appeal was heard in 2003. Carson lost this appeal, but was given leave to appeal, this time to the House of Lords. This appeal heard in 2005. Carson also lost this appeal. With each loss in the UK courts adverse costs were awarded against her.

In 2008, Carson took her appeal to the European Convention on Human Rights (ECHR), in Strasbourg, where she was joined by 12 other "frozen" pensioners from Canada and Australia. They lost this case and in 2010 they appealed to the Grand Chamber of the ECHR in 2010. This final appeal was lost by 11 votes to 6.

== Bibliography ==
- 1984 – Flight Unlimited (co-writer Eric Müller) (also with French and Italian translations) - ISBN 0950925209
- 1986 – Flight Fantastic: The Illustrated History of Aerobatics - ISBN 0854294902
- 1995 – Flight Unlimited ’95 (co-writer Eric Müller) - ISBN 0-620-18774-3
- 2008 – Richard III: The Maligned King – hardback ISBN 9781803991832, paperback edition (2009) ISBN 9780752452081; Revised paperback edition (2023) ISBN 9781803991832; ebook (2023) ISBN 978-0752473147
- 2001 – Jeff Beck: Crazy Fingers – paperback ISBN 9780879306328, ebook ISBN 978-1-61774-484-6
- 2013 – Richard III: A Small Guide to the Great Debate – paperback ISBN 978-0-9576840-0-3, ebook ISBN 978-0-9576840-1-0
- 2014 – Finding Richard III: The Official Account – paperback ISBN 978-0-9576840-2-7, ebook ISBN 978-0-9576840-3-4
- 2015 – Richard Duke of Gloucester as Lord Protector and High Constable of England – paperback ISBN 978-0-9576840-4-1, ebook ISBN 978-0-9576840-5-8
- 2019 – Camel Pilot Supreme: Captain D V Armstrong DFC - ISBN 978-1526752673, ebook ISBN 978-1526752697
- 2021 – Domenico Mancini: de occupatione regni Anglie – paperback ISBN 978-0-87930-632-8, ebook ISBN 978-0-9576840-7-2
- 2026 - Richard III Unspun - paperback ISBN 978-1-80634-044-6, ebook ISBN 978-1-80634-255-6
