= Frozen state pension =

British pensions which are frozen at the same rate in some countries

Frozen state pensions is the practice of the British Government of "freezing" UK State Pensions, (that is, not uprating the amount in line with "Triple Lock" on an annual basis, as is done for residents in the UK), for pensioners who live in the majority of other countries, apart from the European Community countries and other countries with reciprocal agreements with the UK.

Groups that have been lobbying to remove this discrepancy include the Canadian Alliance of British Pensioners (CABP) and British Pensions in Australia (BPIA), which jointly own the International Consortium of British Pensioners (ICBP). There is also an All-Party Parliamentary Group on Frozen British Pensions in the UK Parliament.

== Description ==
All British state pensioners receive their pension based on the level of their compulsory and voluntary contributions to the National Insurance Fund. Pensioners resident in Britain, receive an annual uprating known as the "triple lock" – the higher of the increase in CPI (price inflation), average earnings growth, or 2.5%. In 2024, the increase was 8.5%. However, if the pensioner moves abroad, the annual uprating depends on where they live, with residents of most countries receiving no annual uprating.

The only other countries in which the UK state pension rises in the same way as UK state pensioners are: the European Union countries (which continued after Brexit); Switzerland; Barbados; Bermuda; Bosnia-Herzegovina; Guernsey; Isle of Man; Israel; Jamaica; Jersey; Mauritius; Montenegro; North Macedonia; the Philippines; Serbia; Turkey; and the United States of America.

Most British Commonwealth countries are in the frozen list; including Australia, Canada, South Africa, New Zealand, and India, as well as British overseas territories such as the Falkland Islands. Thailand is also on the list.

Pensioners who return to the UK can get their pension uprated to the full amount by applying to the Department for Work and Pensions, but this rate only applies so long as they are in the UK.

== Numbers ==
As of April 2022 the number of pensioners affected is around 492,000, with some of the oldest of these receiving only £30 to £40 a week, instead of the £185.15 full state pension they would be receiving if in the UK or one of the eligible countries. Included among the group of older pensioners missing out are Albert Johnson, a 103-year-old veteran of World War II, and his 95-year-old wife, Mary, who now live in Western Australia.

For men born before April 1951 and women before April 1953, the basic State Pension is £184.90 a week from April 2026, if living in the U.K. or an eligible country. However, people who retired in a non-eligible country in 2000, when the full basic rate was £67.50 a week in 2000, will still be receiving the same rate.

A 2021 enquiry by the All-Party Parliamentary Group on Frozen Pensions (one of many APPGs) in the UK Parliament found that one in two of the approximately 230,000 frozen pensioners in Australia were receiving £65 UK pounds or less.

== Lobby groups ==
During and since the Carson case, various groups and individuals have been lobbying politicians both in the UK and in the countries in which the pensioners are resident, and petitions have been raised.

There is an international consortium of lobby groups, funded by the member organisations, British Pensions in Australia (BPIA) and the Canadian Alliance of British Pensioners (CABP), funded by the memberships and donations of individual members. BPIA and CABP jointly own the International Consortium of British Pensioners (ICBP), and they liaise with the All-Party Parliamentary Group on Frozen British Pensions (APPG) in the UK Parliament.

As of 2022 Sir Roger Gale, Conservative MP for North Thanet, is chair of the Frozen Pensions APPG. In 2015 he wrote a letter to all parliamentarians inviting them to join the group. There are three vice-chairs from the House of Lords and all major parties are represented among the seven vice-chairs.

The APPG submitted a report based on around 800 submissions to Parliament in 2021, stating its concerns about the effects of the policy on British war veterans, former public servants, members of the Windrush Generation who had returned to their country of birth, and many others.

=== Canada ===
Anne Puckridge, a 100-year-old expatriate living in Canada, and who has twice delivered petitions to Downing Street, is the ambassador of the ICBP as of 2022, and she has been campaigning since 2001 for pension parity. She is a former college lecturer and served as an intelligence officer in the Women's Royal Naval Service during the Second World War.

=== Australia ===
It was revealed in the 2021 APPG report that the Australian Government had made a series of representations to the British Government over several years, including at Ministerial level, to no avail. The UK frozen pensions policy means that Australia subsidises UK pensioners resident in Australia.

== 2002 legal challenge ==
In April 2002, writer Annette Carson, a UK pensioner resident in South Africa, challenged the policy in the English High Court under the Human Rights Act 1998, but the judge ruled against her, stating in the judgment that the up-ratings issue was a political one, not a judicial one. An appeal to the Court of Appeal (2003) failed, as did an appeal to the House of Lords (2005) and the European Court of Human Rights (2008).

A subsequent referral to the Grand Chamber of the European Court of Human Rights in 2009–2010 said that it did not consider that the applicants, who were resident outside the UK in countries which were not party to reciprocal agreements, were in a relevantly similar position to residents of the UK or of countries which did have such agreements. It, therefore, held (by eleven votes to six) that there had been no discrimination.
