= McNair (disambiguation) =

McNair is a surname.

McNair may also refer to:

== Places ==
=== United States ===
- McNair, Arkansas, an unincorporated community
- McNair, Minnesota, an unincorporated community
- McNair, Texas, an unincorporated community
- McNair, Virginia, a census-designated place

=== Elsewhere ===
- McNair Nunatak, Mac. Robertson Land, Antarctica
- McNair (crater), a lunar impact crater
- 3354 McNair, an asteroid
- Mount McNair, a mountain in Canada

== Other uses ==
- McNair Barracks, a former US Army installation in Berlin, Germany
- McNair Field, a baseball stadium in Forest City, North Carolina
- Baron McNair, a British peerage title
- USS McNair (DD-679), a US Navy destroyer

== See also ==
- Fort Lesley J. McNair
- Matthew McNair Secondary School, British Columbia, Canada
- McNair High School (disambiguation)
- McNeir (disambiguation)
