= McNair =

McNair is a surname. Notable people with the surname include:

- Alexander McNair (1775–1826), American politician
- Andrew McNair (custodian), ringer of the Liberty Bell
- Andrew McNair (actor)
- Arnold McNair, 1st Baron McNair (1885–1975)
- Barbara McNair (1934–2007), African-American singer and actress
- Benjamin McNair (born 1974), Australian actor
- Bob McNair (1937–2018), American businessman
- Buck McNair (1919–1971), Canadian Second World War flying ace
- Cal McNair (born 1961), American NFL executive
- Chris McNair (1925–2019), American businessman and politician
- Clarence McNair (born 1977), American writer and entrepreneur
- Craig McNair (born 1975), New Zealand politician
- Duncan McNair, British lawyer, activist and author
- Eric Archibald McNair (1894–1918), Victoria Cross recipient
- Evander McNair (1820–1902), American army officer
- Frederick McNair (disambiguation), multiple people
  - Fred McNair (born 1950), American tennis player
  - Fred McNair (born 1968), American football player
  - Frederick V. McNair Jr. (1882–1962), American naval officer
- Gabrial McNair (born 1973), composer
- Harold McNair (1931–1971), British saxophonist
- Heather McNair, American actress
- Ian McNair (1933–2007), Australian market researcher
- Janice McNair (born 1936), owner of the Houston Texans
- John McNair (congressman) (1800–1861), American politician
- John B. McNair (1889–1968), premier of New Brunswick, Canada, from 1940 to 1952
- John Frederick Adolphus McNair (1828–1910), British engineer
- Lesley J. McNair (1883–1944), American general
- Paddy McNair (born 1995), Northern Ireland footballer
- Paul D. McNair (born 1959), Canadian non-profit executive
- Richard Lee McNair (born 1958), American criminal
- Rick McNair (1942–2007), playwright, author, director
- Robert Evander McNair (1923–2007), American politician, governor of South Carolina
- Robin McNair (1918–1996), British Royal Air Force Second World War fighter pilot and civilian aviation executive
- Ronald McNair (1950–1986), physicist and astronaut
- Sally McNair (born 1956), British journalist
- Steve McNair (1973–2009), American National Football League quarterback
- Sylvia McNair (born 1956), American opera singer
- Todd McNair (born 1965), American football coach
- Winifred McNair (1877–1954), British tennis player
- William N. McNair (1880–1948), mayor of Pittsburgh, Pennsylvania from 1934 to 1936

Fictional characters

- Tom McNair, a lead character in the British television series Being Human

== See also ==
- Media related to McNair (surname) at Wikimedia Commons
- MacNair
- McNair-Wilson
