= Frederick McNair =

Frederick McNair may refer to:

- Frederick V. McNair (1839–1900), American Rear Admiral in the United States Navy, veteran of the American Civil War
- Frederick V. McNair Jr. (1882–1962), American Captain in the United States Navy, awarded the Medal of Honor
- Frederick V. McNair, IV, known as Fred McNair (born 1950), American champion tennis player
- Fred McNair (gridiron football) (born 1968), American football player and coach

== See also ==
- McNair (disambiguation)
- McNair
