= McNair-Wilson =

Double-barrelled surname

McNair-Wilson is a double-barrelled surname. It is also a political family in the United Kingdom.

== List of people with the surname ==
- Laura Farris née McNair-Wilson (born 1978), British Member of Parliament for Newbury (2019–present)
- Patrick McNair-Wilson (born 1929), British Member of Parliament for Lewisham West (1964–1966) and New Forest (1968–1997)
- Michael McNair-Wilson (1930 – 28 March 1993), British Member of Parliament for Walthamstow East (1969–1974)
- Robert McNair Wilson (1882–1963), British surgeon, writer and journalist and politician

== See also ==
- List of political families in the United Kingdom
- McNair
- Wilson (name)
- MacNair
