= Donald M. Hess =

Swiss winemaker (1936–2023)

- Born: Donald Marc Conrad Hess; 3 August 1936; Bern, Switzerland
- Died: 30 January 2023 (aged 86); Bern, Switzerland
- Citizenship: Switzerland; United States
- Occupations: Businessman, winemaker, art collector
- Known for: Entrepreneurship, art collecting
- Spouse: married
- Children: 1
- Relatives: Julius C. Burrows (maternal great-great-grandfather)

Donald Marc Conrad Hess colloquially Donald M. Hess (3 August 1936 – 30 January 2023) was a Swiss American businessman, winemaker and art collector who was primarily known through his wineries Hess Family Estates (today also Hess Persson) in the Napa Valley.

== Early life and education ==
Hess was born 3 August 1936 in Bern, Switzerland, to Hector Albert Hess (1890–1957), businessman, wine wholeseller and brewery owner, and American-born Louise Hess (née McNeir; born 1907), originally from New York City, into an affluent Protestant family. He had a brother and sister.

His paternal family belonged to Bernese bourgeoisie and had owned the Steinhölzli brewery for the past seven generations. His father, Hector A. Hess, a businessman and manufacturer, was already frequently visiting the United States, and at the end of the 1940s the family resided at Birchwood estate in Locust Valley, New York which was designed by Howard Greenley. His mother hailed from the Scottish McNeir family, that had been settled in Anne Arundel, Maryland, since the early 18th century. His great-great-grandfather was Julius C. Burrows.

He completed compulsory schooling in Bern and returned to manage the family business in 1956 after the sudden death of his father. Previously, Hess completed an apprenticeship at the Ducal Bavarian Brewery of Tegernsee at Tegernsee, Germany.

== Professional career ==
. As a specialty, he used a new method for brewing a non-alcoholic beer, which became successful in the entire Switzerland. After a few years, he sold his brewery to a larger group and used the proceeds to buy a mineral spring in Vals, a village in the Grisons to produce bottled mineral water. Over the next years, this mineral water, labeled Valser, became the leading brand in Switzerland. He sold this business to the local Coca Cola Company in 2002.

Hess also inherited a hotel in Morocco. To expand this business, he began managing hotels for other owners. At its peak, he had a workforce of 12,000 employees in that country. When he sold these operations, he wanted to reinvest the funds in a US mineral water company. For this purpose, he traveled to the US looking for such opportunities. In the Napa Valley he tasted local wines and was impressed by their quality. He decided to look for vineyards instead of mineral water sources. Against the trend in the Napa Valley, he bought his first vineyards higher up at the foot of the Mayacamas Mountains in the Mount Veeder AVA area in 1978. In addition, he leased the old Christian Brothers winery building nearby where he created a museum for contemporary art. Later, additional vineyards were bought by Hess in Northern California. The unique combination of wineries and art collection is called the Hess Collection. In the corresponding museum, a world-class private collection of contemporary art is open to the public. Among the artists, from whom Hess bought works, are Magdalena Abakanowicz, Francis Bacon, Georg Baselitz, Balthasar Burkhard, John Connell, James G. Davis, Franz Gertsch, Deryck Healey, Lynn Hershman Leeson, Anselm Kiefer, Alois Lichtsteiner, Morris Louis, Robert Motherwell, Nakis Panayotidis, Markus Raetz, Robert Rauschenberg, Frank Stella, Gustav Troger, Ouattara Watts, and Markus Zürcher.

While travelling, Hess discovered an interesting but rundown winery high up in the mountains of Argentina called Bodega Colomé. It had already a tradition of over 150 years. Its vineyards are at 2200 to 3100 meters above sea level. Together with his wife Ursula, they decided to buy the property in 2001 and develop not only the winery but also the small mountain village. They made it their home. The wines at Bodega Colomé are certified biodynamic. One of the wines produced is called Altura Maxima, as this wine is made from grapes at the highest elevation worldwide. Similar to his winery in the Napa Valley, Hess built a museum close to this winery in 2009. However, this museum is exclusively dedicated to the installations of James Turrell.

Hess bought additional wineries in Australia (2003: Peter Lehmann) and two wineries in South Africa so that eight wineries on four continents belonged to the international Hess Group. In 2016, the Hess Group, organized as Hess Family Estates under the leadership of two stepsons of Donald Hess, sold their wineries in Australia and South Africa and concentrated on their operations in California and Argentina.

== Personal life and death ==
Hess was married and had a daughter and two stepdaughters. He was the proprietor of the Rörswil Estate in Bolligen near Bern, which has been in family ownership since 1930.

He died on 30 January 2023, at the age of 86.
