= Ive Sulentic =

Canadian soccer player

Johnny Sulentic
Personal information
- Full name: John Ive Sulentic
- Date of birth: 24 December 1979 (age 46)
- Place of birth: Vancouver, British Columbia, Canada
- Position: Midfielder

Team information
- Current team: Port Moody Soccer Club (Technical Director)

Youth career
- Matthew McNair Secondary School
- Edwardsville High School
- Dinamo Zagreb

Senior career*
| Years | Team | Apps | (Gls) |
| 1999–2005 | Vancouver Whitecaps | 110 | (30) |
| 2005–2006 | FC St. Pauli | 24 | (2) |
| 2006–2007 | Vancouver Whitecaps | 0 | (0) |

International career
| 1998 | Canada U20 | 1 | (0) |
| 2000 | Canada U23 | 1 | (0) |
| 2004–2005 | Canada | 2 | (0) |

Managerial career
- 2008: Euro Pro Football Academy
- 2009–: Mountain WFC (U-12 Boys Head Coach)
- * Club domestic league appearances and goals

John Ive Sulentic (born 24 December 1979) is a Canadian former professional soccer player who played as a midfielder.

== Early life ==
Sulentic attended Matthew McNair Secondary School and Edwardsville High School.

== Club career ==
Sulentic began his professional career in 1999 with Vancouver Whitecaps. He broke the USL assist record in his rookie year, with 19 helpers. In 2001, he became Vancouver's all-time assist leader in the post CSL era. In 2002 Sulentic had two trials with Dinamo Zagreb but could not find a place. The Whitecaps offered him a contract in 2005 to play in the USL, but he wanted more money so he moved to German third league side St. Pauli in 2005. In one year in Hamburg he played 24 games and scored two goals.

He was later re-signed by Vancouver but did not play a competitive match. In December 2007 he left Vancouver Whitecaps.

== International career ==
Sulentic represented Canada at the 1998 CONCACAF U-19 Qualification Tournament (Canada did not qualify for the 1999 FIFA World Youth Championship). He was 24 years old when he won his first cap with Canada's senior team on 18 January 2004 in Bridgetown, a 1:0 win over Barbados and he represented Canada at the 2000 CONCACAF Men's Olympic Qualification Tournament.

His final international was a November 2005 friendly match against Luxembourg.

== Coaching career ==
In 2009, Sulentic began his coaching career training the Under-12 Boys of Mountain WFC besides working as Head Coach at Euro Pro Football Academy. He later became the Technical Director at Port Moody Soccer Club.

== Personal life ==
His older brother Petar is a semi-professional soccer player, who played for Croatia SC as well.
