= USS Dickerson =

Wickes-class destroyer

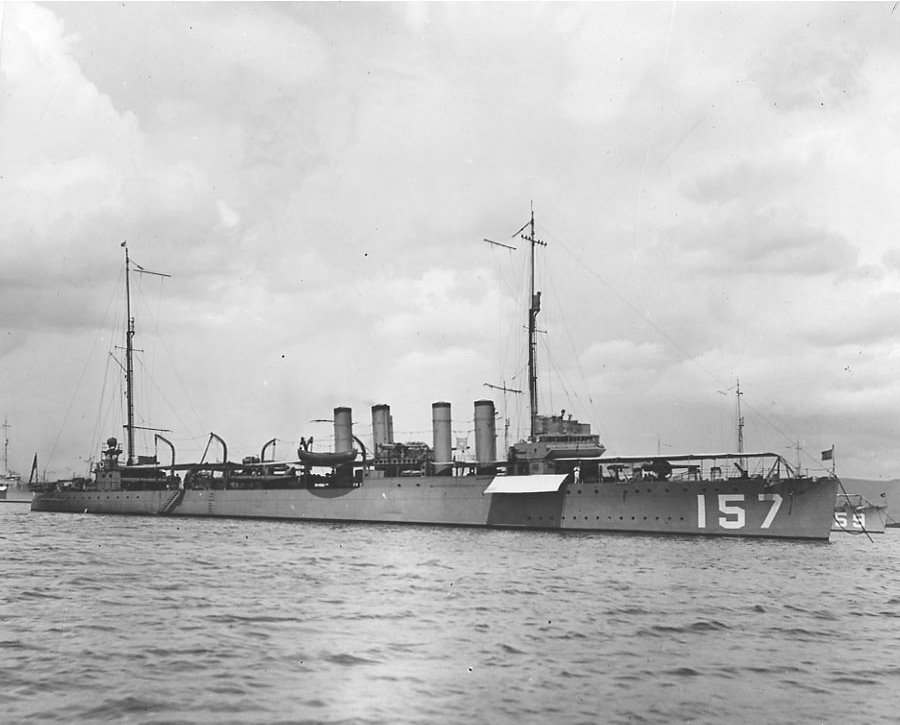
- Dickerson at anchor.

History

United States
- Namesake: Mahlon Dickerson
- Builder: New York Shipbuilding, Camden, New Jersey
- Laid down: 25 May 1918
- Launched: 12 March 1919
- Commissioned: 3 September 1919
- Decommissioned: 25 June 1922
- Recommissioned: 1 May 1930
- Reclassified: High-speed transport, APD-21, 21 August 1943
- Fate: Scuttled 4 April 1945

General characteristics
- Class & type: Wickes-class destroyer
- Displacement: 1,090 tons
- Length: 314 ft 5 in (95.83 m)
- Beam: 31 ft 8 in (9.65 m)
- Draft: 9 ft 4 in (2.84 m)
- Speed: 35 knots (65 km/h)
- Complement: 101 officers and enlisted
- Armament: 4 x 4"/50 (102 mm), 2 x 3"/25 (76 mm), 4 × 3 21-inch (533 mm) torpedo tubes.

USS Dickerson (DD-157) was a Wickes-class destroyer in the United States Navy, and was converted to a high-speed transport at Charleston, South Carolina, and designated APD-21 in 1943. She was named for Mahlon Dickerson (1770–1853), secretary of the Navy from 1834 to 1838.

== Construction and commissioning ==
Dickerson was laid down by the New York Shipbuilding Corporation at Camden, New Jersey, on 25 May 1918, launched on 12 March 1919 by Mrs. J. S. Dickerson and commissioned on 3 September 1919, Cmdr. Frederick V. McNair Jr. in command. Dickerson was decommissioned on 26 June 1922 and placed in reserve at the New York Navy Yard until recommissioned on 1 May 1930, served with the Rotating Reserve, was assigned to the Neutrality Patrol at Key West on 25 July 1940.

== Service history ==
Dickerson operated along the East Coast and in the Caribbean and in 1921 took part in the combined fleet maneuvers off South America, visiting Valparaíso, Callao, and Balboa, Panama, before returning to Hampton Roads, where the U.S. Atlantic Fleet was reviewed by President Warren G. Harding. Entering New York Navy Yard in November 1921, Dickerson was decommissioned there 25 June 1922.

Recommissioned 1 May 1930, Dickerson resumed operations along the East Coast and in the Caribbean, engaging in tactical exercises with carriers, torpedo firing, and maneuvers with the fleet. In 1932 and again in 1933–34, she transited the Panama Canal for combined fleet maneuvers on the West Coast. Upon her return from the latter cruise, she took part in the Presidential Fleet Review on 31 May 1934 at Brooklyn, New York, then entered Norfolk Navy Yard in August, where she was assigned to Rotating Reserve Squadron 19 for overhaul. In 1935, she was attached to the Training Squadron and served as training ship for members of the Naval Reserve, operating between Charleston and Florida and the Caribbean.

Assigned to Destroyer Squadron 10, Atlantic Squadron, in 1938, Dickerson acted as plane guard for Yorktown operating off Norfolk, then took part in the fleet landing exercises in the Caribbean in the spring of 1939. She sailed from Norfolk late that summer to join Squadron 40-T at Lisbon, Portugal. During the year spent in European waters, she visited Spanish ports, aided in the evacuation of refugees from Casablanca,; and executed special mission for the State Department. She returned to Norfolk on 25 July 1940.

=== World War II ===
Dickerson was assigned to the Neutrality Patrol at Key West and except for brief duty at New London with Submarine Squadron 2 in October 1940, remained on patrol in the Caribbean until October 1941. During this time, she searched for and recovered six survivors of Libby Maine in September. After American entry into the war, she was sent to Naval Station Argentia, Newfoundland, where she continued to patrol and escorted one convoy to Iceland and return (December 1941 – January 1942).

By March 1942, Dickerson was back at Norfolk for coastal patrol and escort duty alongside USCGC Dione. On 19 March, while returning to Norfolk, she sighted an unidentified ship, which fired on the destroyer and badly damaged the charthouse. Four of Dickerson's crew were killed, including her commanding officer. The attacking ship was identified as a nervous merchantman, Liberator, and Dickerson continued on to Norfolk for repairs. She returned to duty in April and escorted convoys between Norfolk and Key West until August, between Key West and New York until October, and between New York and Cuba until January 1943.

In the first half of 1943, Dickerson operated in the Caribbean and escorted tanker convoys to Gibraltar and Algiers. She joined the Card hunter-killer group at Casablanca in June for offensive operations in the middle Atlantic. Between 17 July and 13 August, she sailed to Derry, Northern Ireland, for exercises with British Fleet units, returning to Charleston, South Carolina, for conversion to a high-speed transport.

=== Convoys escorted ===
Convoy	Escort Group	Dates	Notes
HX 168		4-10 Jan 1942	from Newfoundland to Iceland
ON 57		24 Jan – 7 Feb 1942	from Iceland to Newfoundland

=== As a high-speed transport ===
Dickerson was reclassified APD-21 on 21 August 1943. She sailed from Norfolk 1 November 1943 for the Pacific. She escorted convoys from Espiritu Santo to Guadalcanal, and then remained in the Solomons on patrol and local escort duty. On 30 January 1944, she landed a reconnaissance group of New Zealanders on Green Island, reembarking them shortly after midnight of 1 February after the boats were strafed by enemy airplanes. On the 15th and 20th, she landed troops on the island to capture and occupy it, and on 20 March landed marines on Emirau Island without opposition.

In April 1944, Dickerson arrived at Milne Bay, and during her 2 months in the New Guinea area, supported the landings at Seleo Island and Aitape. After a brief repair period at Pearl Harbor, she arrived at Roi in the Marshalls to embark an underwater demolition team from Dent and carried them into action at Saipan and Guam. She remained in the Marianas as supply, control, and fire-support ship for her team until the end of July, then returned to the West Coast for overhaul the following month.

=== Fate ===
Dickerson returned to action in November 1944 with her arrival at Aitape, New Guinea. After escort duty in New Guinea, she sailed 27 December for the invasion of Lingayen Gulf, Luzon, on 9 January 1945, again supporting the operations of an underwater demolition team. She reported to Ulithi at the end of January for repairs and then joined the screen of a logistics-support force for the invasion of Iwo Jima on 19 February. She returned to Leyte with 58 prisoners of war, then departed again on 24 March with an LST-LSM convoy, which was assigned to capture the island of Keise Shima, on which heavy artillery would be placed for the bombardment of Okinawa. Her mission complete, Dickerson was with the transports southwest of Okinawa on the night of 2 April, when the Japanese attacked in strength. One of the kamikaze planes approached the destroyer in a long, low glide, and slashed off the tops of her two stacks before smashing into the base of her bridge, toppling her mast and starting intense gasoline fires. Almost simultaneously, another plane scored a direct hit on the center of her forecastle. The explosion tore a hole in the deck almost the complete width of the ship. Despite immediate fire- and damage-control measures, Dickerson's crew was forced to abandon ship when the raging fires threatened her forward magazine. Fifty-four officers and men, including the commanding officer, were lost. Bunch and Herbert stood by to rescue survivors, and Bunch succeeded in putting out the fires that had virtually demolished Dickerson. The smoldering hulk was towed by Arikara to a captured Japanese base, Kerama Retto, the dead and salvageable material were removed, then it was towed out to sea and sunk on 4 April 1945.

== Awards ==
Dickerson received six battle stars for World War II service.
