= Ouattara Watts =

American visual artist

- Born: May 27, 1957 (age 69); Abidjan, Ivory Coast
- Education: École nationale supérieure des Beaux-Arts, Paris
- Known for: Painting, Drawing
- Style: Abstraction
- Website: karmakarma.org/artists/ouattara-watts/bio/

Ouattara Watts (born May 27, 1957) is an Ivory Coast-born American visual artist, known for his multimedia paintings that incorporate African and Western aesthetics and depict themes of spirituality and modernity. His work has been exhibited in reputable collections internationally, and he is classified by Christie's as a "Top Artist."

Watts studied at l'École nationale supérieure des Beaux-Arts in Paris, France.

In Paris, he met Jean-Michel Basquiat at an exhibition opening in January 1988. Basquiat was impressed by Watts's paintings and convinced him to move to New York City. They had a very short but important collaboration. In the documentary Basquiat, Une Vie, Watts was filmed in his studio, working and talking about Basquiat.

Watts has spent much of his career in New York.

== Early life and education ==
Ouattara Watts was born on May 27, 1957 in Abidjan on the Ivory Coast. He was given the name Bakari Ouattara at birth but later switched his name to Ouattara Watts when he moved to New York. Watts was raised in a household that practiced a syncretic religion, which combined beliefs from several religious traditions, including Christianity, Judaism, Islam, and their native West African spirituality. His father was a surgeon and an African spiritual healer. Throughout Watt's childhood, he gained a formal education as well as spiritual schooling. At age seven, Watts began painting and drew images for his spiritual initiation ceremony.

When Watts was sixteen, he dropped out of school and began studying art with books he found at Abidjan’s French Cultural Center, and took an interest to modern art, including works by Pablo Picasso and Amedeo Modigliani. Inspired by their work, he relocated to Paris in 1977, at the age of nineteen, to further his education at the Ecole des Beaux-Arts. Watts also took classes in Paris with Jacques Yankel, a French painter who mentored students from Abibjan. He spent the next several years working in Paris and reflecting on the material he had learned. Watts stated, “I needed to make a synthesis of everything I had learned in Africa and everything that I was learning in the West... I had to assimilate it all.”

== Career ==
In 1985, Watts began showing his work. The next year he had his first solo exhibition at the Centre Culturel de la Rochelle in La Rochelle, France. In January 1988, Watts met Jean-Michel Basquiat at an exhibition at the Galerie Yvon Lambert in Paris. Basquiat was impressed by Watts's work and convinced him to move to New York City. Watts and Basquiat had a close friendship and a very short but important collaboration. Watts still works and resides in New York.

Watts has become a central figure in the rise of African American art, pioneering new ideas within the discipline. His works have been exhibited at the reputable Museum of Modern Arts as well as the Whitney Museum, and sold for up to a staggering US$781,200 in auction at Christie's ("Afro Beat" in 2022). He is classified by Christie's as a "Top Artist" and is featured in numerous prominent private collections. He is represented by Karma and Almine Rech.

== Work influence and themes ==
Ka Cabala Voodoo (1995) at the National Museum of African Art in 2022

Strongly influenced by his West African spiritual upbringing and lived experiences, Watts explores his multicultural identity through his work. Watts depicts themes of spirituality, Pan-Africanism, and modernism in his large scale, abstract compositions. To convey these themes, Watts has developed a signature style where he utilizes iconography as a pictorial device. Watts uses a variety of mediums, including found objects, materials, photographs, and paint, to incorporate African and Western aesthetics into his work. He places cultural references in his pieces to evoke themes of technology and spirituality, contrasting modernity with the long-established. His works are embedded with a visual language that he creates using signs, numerical equations, and photographs of West African spiritual symbols and pop culture icons. Watts once stated,

“My vision is not bound to a country or a continent; it extends beyond borders and all that can be found on a map. While I use identifiable pictorial elements to be better understood, this project is nevertheless about something much wider. I am painting the Cosmos.”

Watt’s work makes a stylistic connection to Neo-Expressionist painting, which developed in the late 1970s, through the iconography he illustrates throughout his work.

== Solo exhibitions ==
- 2019 Ouattara Watts, Paul Rebeyrolle Museum, Limoges FRANCE. June 2 to November 17, Eymoutiers, F 2019
- 2018 Gallery Cecile Fakhoury, "Before Looking at this Work, Listen to It", Abidjan, Ivory Coast
- 2018 La Rotonde, "Get Ready", Abidjan, Ivory Coast
- 2018 Dakar Biennial, Senegal
- 2016 Magazzino d'Arte Moderna, Roma, Italy
- 2015 Galerie Boulakia, Paris, France
- 2012 Ouattara Watts, Vertigo by Vladimir Restoin Roitfeld, New York
- 2010 Hess Art Collection, International Contemporary Art at Glen Carlou, Paarl, South Africa
- 2009 Hess Art Collection, International Contemporary Art at Glen Carlou, Paarl South Africa
- 2008 Magazzino d'Arte Moderna, Roma, Italy
- 2008 Galeria Leyendecker, Santa Cruz de Tenerife, Canary Islands, Spain
- 2008 "Andy Goldsworthy and Ouattara Watts" Two person exhibition, eleven paintings and watercolors from 1992-2006 by Ouattara at International Contemporary Art at Glen Carlou, Paarl, South Africa
- 2007 "Ouattara Watts: For Lily" Mike Weiss Gallery, New York
- 2006 "Ouattara Watts: Works on Paper" Mike Weiss Gallery, New York
- 2004 Tracy Williams Gallery, New York
- 2004 "NH Crossing Currents - The Synergy of Jean-Michel Basquiat and Ouattara Watts" The Hood Museum of Art, Dartmouth College, Hanover
- 2004 Magazzino d'Arte Moderna, Roma, Italy
- 2004 Marella Arte Contemporanea, Milan, Italy
- 2002 Leo Koenig, New York
- 2001 Magazzino d'Arte Moderna, Roma, Italy
- 1999 "Ouattara: in Roma" Magazzino d'Arte Moderna, Rome
- 1998 "Ouattara New Work" Baldwin Gallery, Aspen, Colorado
- 1996 "Ouattara Dark Star" Kemper Museum of Contemporary Art, Kansas City, Missouri
- 1995 "Ouattara: New Paintings" Gagosian Gallery, New York
- 1994 "Ouattara" Berkeley Art Museum, Berkeley, California
- 1993 Galerie Boulakia, Paris, France
- 1992 Vrej Baghoomian Gallery, New York
- 1990 Akira Ikeda Gallery, Nagoya, Japan
- 1989 Marilyn Butler Gallery, Los Angeles, California
- 1986 "Ouattara" Centre Culturel de la Rochelle, La Rochelle, France

== Group exhibitions ==
- 2018 "African Metropolis, an Imaginary City", MaXXI, Roma, Italy
- 2017 Museum FMCCA, Milano, Italy
- 2017 Marella Gallery, Milan, Italy
- 2017 "Afrique Capitales", La Villette, Paris, France
- 2016 Dakar Biennal
- 2010 'In Dialogue' "Four Generations of Painting" Curated by Peter Makebish, Charest-Weinberg, Miami, Florida, USA. Artists: Donald Baechler, Ross Bleckner, Kadar Brock, Brendan Cass, Sante D'Orazio, Matt Jones, John Newsom, Hermann Nitsch, Bill Saylor, Kenny Scharf, Ouattara Watts, Dustin Yellin
- 2009 "Armory Show NYC" Magazzino d'Arte Moderna, Roma, Italy
- 2006 "Intersections: Shifting Identity in Contemporary Art" John Michael Kohler Arts Center, Sheboygan, Wisconsin
- 2006 "Realm of the Spirit. National Museum of African Art" Mike Weiss Gallery, New York
- 2006 "Body of Evidence " Smithsonian Institution, Washington
- 2003 "Black President - The Art and Legacy of Fela Anikulapo-Kuti" New Museum of Contemporary Art, New York City
- 2002 Documenta 11, Kassel, Germany
- 2002 Whitney Biennial, New York, USA
- 2002 " The Short Century: Independence and Liberation Movements in Africa 1945-1994. " P.S.1 Contemporary Art Center, Long Island City, New York, US
- 2000 "Transatlantic Dialog - In And Out of Africa" National Museum of African Art, Washington, US
- 1997 Chiba Museum of Art, Chiba, Japan
- 1994 "Un Altre Pais" Centro Atlantico de Arte Moderno, Las Palmas Fundacion, Spain
- 1994 La Caixa, Palma de Mallorca, La Virreina Expositions, Barcelona, Spain
- 1993 Venice Biennale, Italy
- 1991 " Syncretism: The Art of the 20th Century" The Alternative Museum, New York, US
- 1991 " African Explores: New and Renewed Forms in the 20th Century Art " The New Museum of Contemporary Art, New York, NY. Traveled exhibition: Berkeley Art Museum, St. Louis Art Museum, Mint Museum of Art, The Carnegie Museum of Art, The Corcoran Museum of Art, The Center of Fine Arts, Ludwig Forum für Internationale Kunst, Aachen; Antoni Tàpies Fondacion, Espace Lyonnais d'Art Contemporain, Tate Gallery
- 1990 " Images of Death in Contemporary Art" Patrick and Beatrice Haggerty Museum of Art, Milwaukee
- 1985 Musée National des Arts Africans et Océaniens, Paris

== Books and catalogs ==
- 2018 "Ouattara Watts : Before Looking at this Work, Listen to It", Catalogue, 81 pages, English and French language, published by Galerie Cécile Fakhoury, Abidjan, 2018, ISBN 978-2-9542653-1-5
- 2010 Hess Art Collection" by Donald M. Hess and Myrtha Steiner. Hardcover: 372 pages, Publisher: Hatje Cantz (January 31, 2010), Language: English, ISBN 978-3-7757-2139-4, Product Dimensions: 11.2 x 10 x 1.3 inches
- 2007 Mike Weiss Gallery, USA, catalog
- 2004 Hood Museum of Art Crossing Currents - The Synergy of Jean-Michel Basquiat and Ouattara Watts, catalog
- 2003 New Museum. Black President: Fela Anikulapokuti, catalog
- 2002 Cantz, Hatje. Documenta II Platform 5, catalog
- 2002 Biennial Exhibition Whitney Museum, New York, Prentice Hall/Abrams, catalog
- 1999 Magazzino D'Arte Moderna "Ouattara Watts in Roma", catalog
- 1995 Janson, H. W. History of Art. 5th ed. New York: Prentice Hall/Abrams, catalog
- 1990 Barrière, Gérard. Ouattara. Galerie Boulakia, Paris, catalog
- 1989 Warren, Ben Michael and Vrej Baghoomian, eds. Ouattara, Art Random, Kyoto: Kyoto Shoin, International Co., Ltd., 1989. Introduction by Ben Michael Warren, catalog

== Articles and reviews ==
- 2019 ARTFORUM, Ouattara Watts : Mara Hoberman February 2019 pages 196
- 2018 Anna Sylvestre-Treiner, Jeune Afrique, Gardien du Cosmos, n°3021, p. 86-87, December 2018, France
- 2018 Sarah Moroz, Modern Painters, "Thinking global, acting local", p. 17, p. 22, December 2018, USA
- 2018 Hannah O'Leary, Sothebys.com, From Côte d'Ivoire to Basquiat's New York, Interview, March 2018, UK
- 2015 Roxana Azimi, Le Monde, Ouattara Watts, le plus americain des artistes ivoiriens, April. 28 2015, France
- 2015 Clotide Scordia, Happening, Ouattara Watts, Mystical Storyteller, April. 22 2015, USA
- 2015 Henri-francois Debailleux, Le Journal des arts. no.434, France, 24 April to 7 May 2015
- 2012 Glenn O'Brien. Telles of Magic and Science in the Paintings by Quattara Watts. Alessandro Benetton's Blog March 26. 2012
- 2012 Karen Dayon, Ouattara Watts . Cool Hunting. New York. January 27/ 2012
- 2004 An article on Watts by Massimo Carboni published in Art Forum May 2004
- 2004 " Watts, l'ossessione magica dei numeri: L'artista ivoriano al Magazzino d'arte moderna" Pancotto, Pier Paolo, L' Unita Roma, 04.February.2004 (in Italian)
- 2002 Robinson, Walter. ArtNet.com Magazine Reviews, May 9
- 2002 Cotter, Holland. The New York Times, March 8
- 2001 Cotter, Holland. The New York Times, July 27
- 1995 Cotter, Holland. Mix of Culture, Politics and Bravado, The New York Times, May 19
- "La pittura magica di Ouattara Watts" dated 01.31.2004 in Corriere della Sera (in Italian)
- "'Body' & Soul: Fleshing Out African Art" a review on Washington Post dated June 18, 2006 by Lynne Duke
