= Marianna O'Gallagher =

Canadian historian (1929–2010)

Marianna O'Gallagher, CM CQ (March 24, 1929 – May 24, 2010) was a Canadian historian from Quebec City. A former member of the Sisters of Charity of Halifax, she wrote extensively on the history of the Irish in Quebec City, was involved in the creation of Grosse Isle National Historic Site and the revival of the Quebec City Saint Patrick's Day celebrations.

== Biography ==
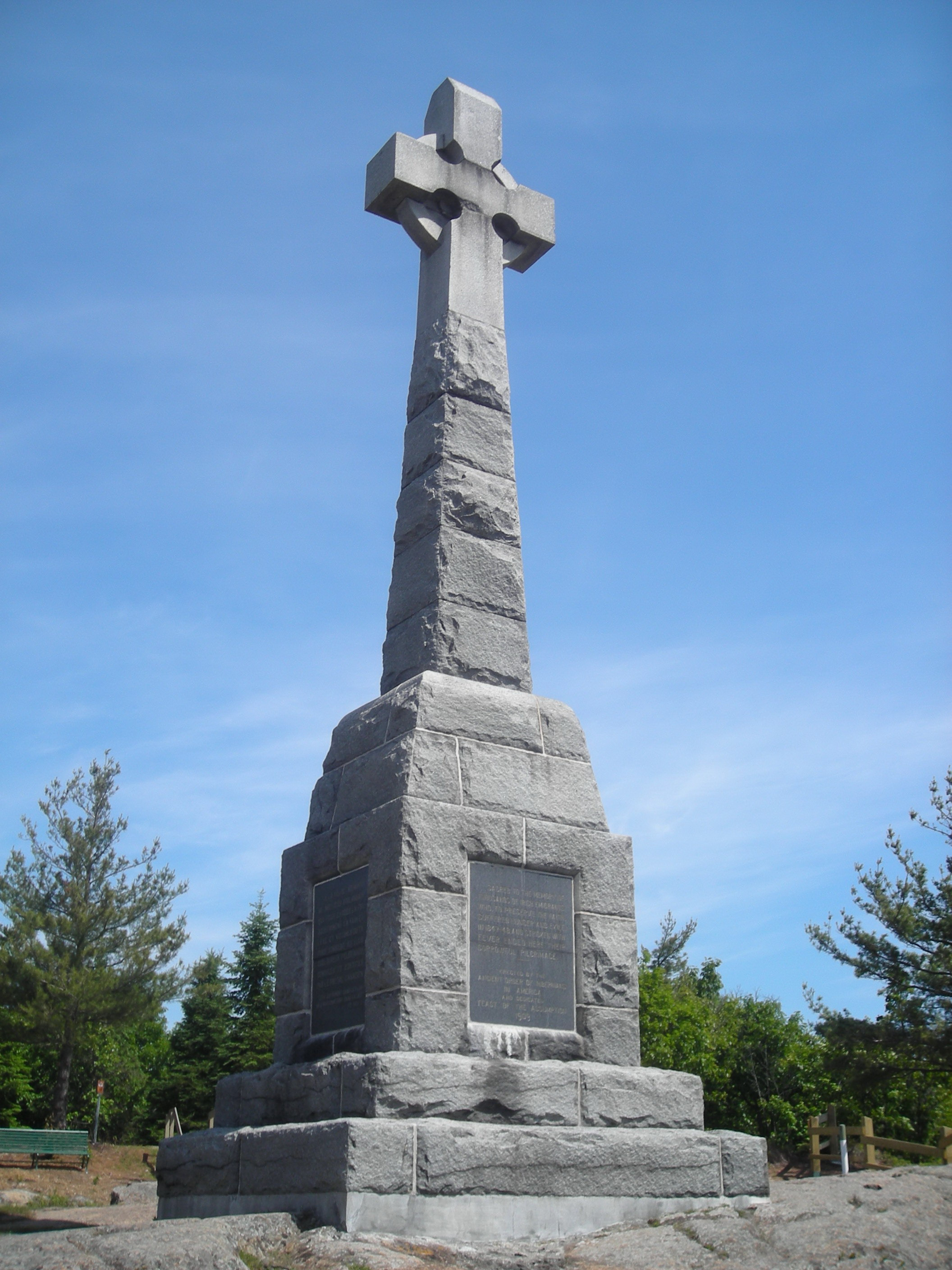
On the cross designed by her grandfather, O'Gallagher commented: "He drew the design on the wall of the kitchen at 13 Conroy St. in Quebec City. My father said as more and more money came in, the monument grew in size and stature on the wall." (Note: Conroy Street is now known as Louis-Alexandre Taschereau Street (French: Rue Louis-Alexandre-Taschereau); Marianna herself grew in a house on Chemin Saint-Louis, in Sainte-Foy, now occupied by a Manoir Sainte Foy, an Italian restaurant.)

O'Gallagher was born in Sainte-Foy, Quebec, in 1929, one of six siblings born to Norma (née O'Neil) and Dermot O'Gallagher, both Irish-Canadians; her father was a land surveyor and previous mayor of the city (now merged into Quebec City). Her paternal grandfather, Jeremiah Gallagher, designed the Celtic cross erected on Grosse Isle in 1909 by the Ancient Order of Hibernians; the twelve-meter monument is the largest Celtic cross in North America.

She entered the Sisters of Charity of Halifax in 1952 and taught in Nova Scotia and New England, before she settled back in Quebec City, where she taught for 25 years at St. Patrick's High School there. Over that time she earned a Bachelor's degree in History from Halifax's Mount Saint Vincent University, later followed by a Master's degree from the University of Ottawa. (Note: Although the Globe and Mail states it to be a doctorate, all other sources agree that it was a Master's degree.) Her thesis was about Quebec City's St. Patrick's Church, and her interest in Irish-Quebecer history would continue for her whole life.

In 1973, O'Gallagher was allowed by the federal government (who had owned it since the establishment of the quarantine station) to visit Grosse Isle, which she found in a state of disrepair. This marked the beginning of her efforts to have the site federally recognized. She founded Irish Heritage Quebec the same year, an organization dedicated to the local promotion of Irish-Canadian history. (Note: It is not clear which event occurred first or whether one was a cause of the other.) She remained president of Irish Heritage Quebec until 2009.

The 1980s marked the beginning of O'Gallagher's community work. She founded bilingual publisher Carraig Books in 1981. In 1983 she started a committee for the designation of Grosse Isle; these efforts came to fruition with the 1984 designation of the island as a historic site, a designation augmented in 1988 to that of National Historic Site of Canada. Meanwhile, in 1985, she had left the religious community. She is credited with almost single-handed responsibility in the creation of the National Historic Site. In 1997, she spearheaded a series of events in Quebec City, the Irish Summer (French: L'Été des Irlandais).

"Though for some odd reason she was almost always referred to as "a former nun," a more unlikely ex-nun would have been hard to imagine. She was large, cheerful, almost dominating any group where Quebec Irish heritage was being discussed, and head-and-shoulders the most knowledgeable."

— Reminiscences of an encounter during a 1993 event at Grosse Isle.

O'Gallagher spent the rest of her life writing books and articles on Irish-Canadian history, for which she became a major figure in the Canadian Irish studies community. The Canadian Association for Irish Studies had, days before her death, established an annual lecture named after her. She was the recipient of the Canadian Catholic Historical Association's G. E. Clerk Award in 1999, of the Order of Quebec in 1998, and the Order of Canada in 2002. She was repeatedly included in Irish America's Global 100 lists, and was a member of the organizing committee for Quebec City's 2008 400th anniversary celebrations.

O'Gallagher was hospitalized in April 2010, upon which it was discovered that she had advanced lung cancer, despite not being a smoker herself. She died, having never married, on May 24, 2010, aged 81. A few months earlier, she had been Grand Marshal to Quebec City's first Saint Patrick's Days parade in 80 years, and she was at the time amongst the people featured in the exposition Being Irish O'Quebec at Montreal's McCord Museum.

== Partial bibliography ==
- O'Gallagher, Marianna. (1979) Saint-Patrice de Québec: La Construction d'une église et l'implantation d'une paroisse. Translated by Guy Doré. "Cahiers d'Histoire", 32. Quebec City: Société Historique de Québec. 126 p. ISBN 2-920069-01-2.
  - This is a French translation of O'Gallagher Master's thesis. An English version was published as Saint Patrick's, Quebec : the building of a church and of a parish, 1827 to 1833 (ISBN 0-9690805-0-6) by Carraig Books in 1981.
- __________________. (1981) Saint Brigid's, Quebec: the Irish care for their people, 1856 to 1981. Sainte-Foy: Carraig Books. 80 p. ISBN 0-9698581-1-6.
- __________________. (1984) Grosse Ile: gateway to Canada 1832-1937. Sainte-Foy: Carraig Books. 184 p. ISBN 0-9690805-3-0.
  - Published in French as La Grosse-Île: Porte d'entrée du Canada, 1832-1937 in a translation by Michèle Bourbeau (ISBN 978-0-9690805-4-1).
- __________________ & Rose Masson Dompierre. (1995) Eyewitness, Grosse Îsle 1847. Sainte-Foy: Carraig Books. 432 p. ISBN 0-9690805-9-X.
  - Published in French as Les témoins parlent, Grosse Île 1847 (ISBN 0-9698581-0-8).
- __________________. (1998) The shamrock trail : tracing the Irish in Quebec city. Sainte-Foy: Carraig Books. 35 p. ISBN 0-9698581-1-6.
  - French translation published in 1999 as Le Chemin du trèfle: La Présence irlandaise à Québec (ISBN 0-9698581-2-4).
