= McNair High School =

McNair High School may refer to:

- Ronald E. McNair High School (California), Stockton, California
- McNair High School (Georgia), DeKalb County, Georgia
- Dr. Ronald E. McNair Academic High School, Jersey City, New Jersey

== See also ==
- Ronald McNair (1950–1986), American NASA astronaut and physicist
- Matthew McNair Secondary School, a high school in Richmond, British Columbia, Canada
