= Mount Saint Vincent University =

University in Halifax, Nova Scotia, Canada

Coordinates: 44°40′15″N 63°38′47″W

- Former names: Mount Saint Vincent Academy (1873–1925); Mount Saint Vincent College (1925–1966)
- Motto: Veritas ad Deum ducit (Latin)
- Motto in English: Truth Leads to God
- Type: Public liberal arts university
- Established: 1873; 153 years ago
- Affiliations: AUCC, IAU, CBIE, CUP.
- Endowment: CAN$36.22 million (as of March 31, 2022)
- Chancellor: Vacant
- President: Joël Dickinson
- Total staff: 600
- Students: 3,719 (Fall 2026)
- Undergraduates: 2,702
- Postgraduates: 1,017
- Location: 166 Bedford Highway; Halifax, Nova Scotia; B3M 2J6
- Campus: Suburban
- Colours: Dark Blue
- Nickname: Mystics
- Mascot: Captain Crow
- Website: www.msvu.ca

Mount Saint Vincent University, often referred to as the Mount, is a public, primarily undergraduate, university located in Halifax, Nova Scotia, Canada, and was established in 1873. Mount Saint Vincent offers undergraduate programs in arts, science, education, and professional studies. The Mount has 13 graduate degrees in Applied Human Nutrition, School Psychology, Child and Youth Study, Education, Family Studies and Gerontology, Public Relations and Women's Studies. The Mount offers a doctorate program and a Ph.D. in Educational Studies through a joint initiative with St. Francis Xavier University and Acadia University. The Mount offers more than 190 courses, ten undergraduate degree programs, and four online graduate programs.

The university holds has Canada Research Chairs in Gender Identity and Social Practices, Food Security, and Policy Change. This institution has a Chair in learning disabilities, a Master of Public Relations program, a Bachelor of Science in Communication Studies, among other programs and research initiatives.

== History ==
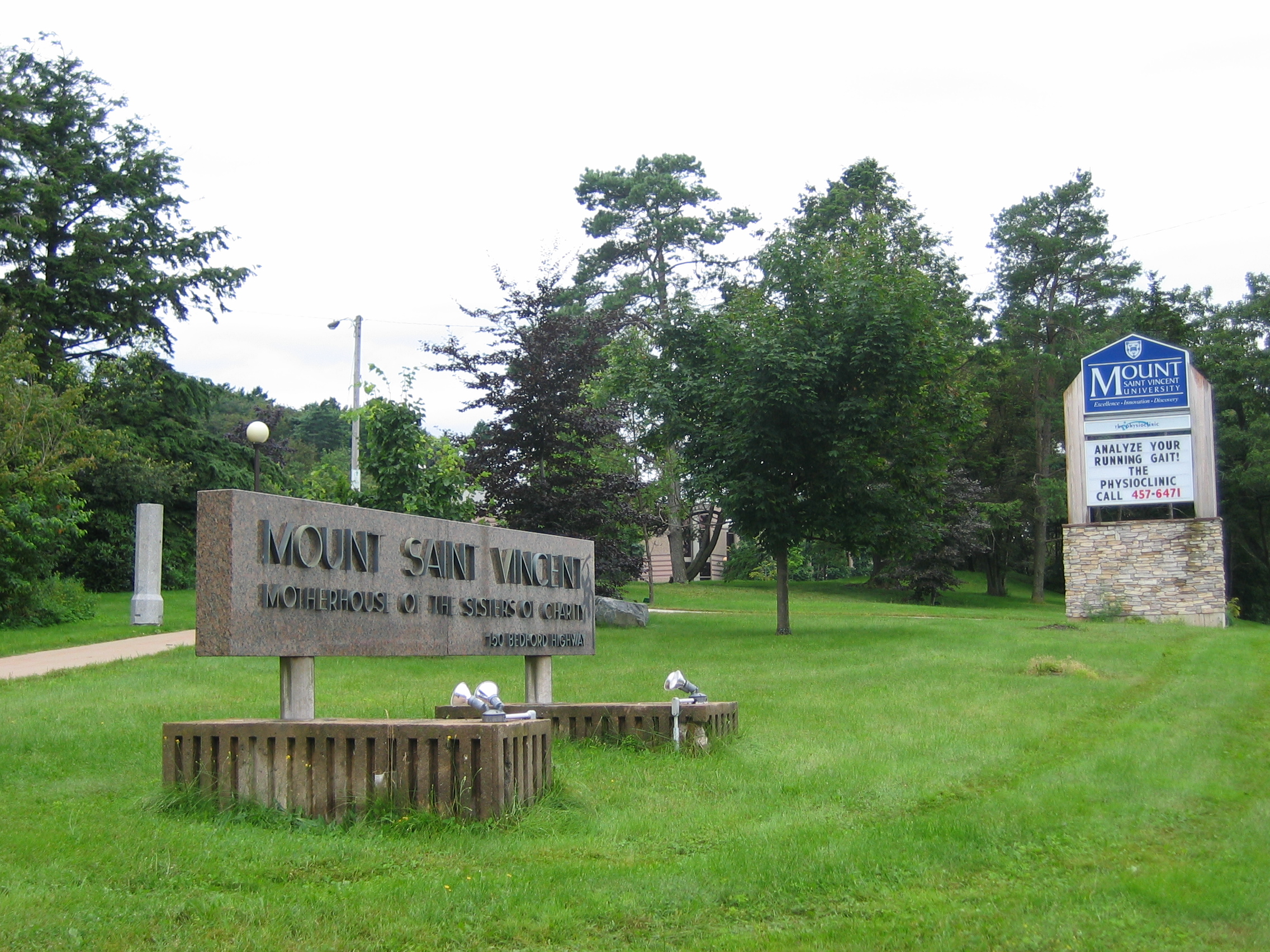
Mount Saint Vincent University Entrance from the Bedford Highway, Halifax

Established by the Sisters of Charity of Saint Vincent de Paul (Halifax) as a women's college in 1873, the Mount was one of the few institutions of higher education for women in Canada at a time when women could not vote. The original purpose of the academy was to train novices and young sisters as teachers. Still, the Sisters also recognized a need to educate other young women. Over the ensuing years, the order developed a convent, schools, an orphanage, and health care facilities throughout the Halifax area and across North America.

The Sisters of Charity Halifax, also staffed the Shubenacadie Residential School in Nova Scotia, which was open from 1930 to 1967, and the Cranbrook Residential School in British Columbia, which was open from 1890 to 1970. In October 2021, then-MSVU President Dr. Ramona Lumpkin apologized on behalf of the university to the survivors, their families and communities, as well as all Indigenous peoples, for the university’s role in the tragedy of residential schools in Canada.

Architect Charles Welsford West designed the Romanesque chapel and annex (1903–05) at Mount St. Vincent Academy (now the University). He was the Architect of Nova Scotia Public Works & Mines 1932–1950.

By 1912, the Sisters of Charity of Saint Vincent de Paul (Halifax) recognized the need to offer more significant opportunities through university education. They adopted a plan to establish a college for young women. Two years later, in 1914, the Sisters partnered with Dalhousie University, enabling Mount Saint Vincent to offer the first two years of a bachelor's degree program to be credited toward a Dalhousie degree.

In 1925, the Nova Scotia Legislature awarded the Mount the right to grant degrees, making it the only independent women's college in the British Commonwealth. By 1951, degrees were offered in Arts, Secretarial Science, Music, Home Economics, Library Science, Nursing and Education.

A new charter was granted in 1966, and the College became Mount Saint Vincent University, establishing a board of governors and senate. This period included enrollment increases, new construction, and additional institutional agreements. In 1967, the Mount began admitting male students. The university expanded additional programs in the 1970s and entered into new fields, including Child Study, Public Relations, Gerontology, Tourism and Hospitality Management, Cooperative Education, and Distance Education. In July 1988, the Sisters of Charity of Saint Vincent de Paul (Halifax) transferred ownership of the institution to the Board of Governors.

=== Caritas Day ===
After a fire in 1951 burned down Mount Saint Vincent's only building, the people of Halifax provided alternative accommodations for classes. The Sisters of Charity established a memorial holiday in appreciation of their gesture. Caritas Day, named after the Christian virtue of charity, takes place on the last Wednesday of January of each year. No classes are held on this day, and students are encouraged to volunteer their time instead.

== Programs ==
Mount Saint Vincent University offers over 40 undergraduate arts, sciences, and professional studies degrees. Professional studies programs include Applied Human Nutrition, Business Administration, Child and Youth Study, Family Studies and Gerontology, Information Technology, Public Relations, Non-profit Leadership, and Tourism and Hospitality Management. Undergraduate programs include work-placement opportunities such as practicums, co-operative education, and internships.

The Mount also offers diplomas in Business Administration and tourism and hospitality Management and certificates in Accounting, Business Administration, Marketing, Proficiency in French, and Non-profit Leadership.

The faculty of Education offers a graduate program in school psychology, which it states is the only program of its kind in Atlantic Canada. Graduates of this program are eligible to become registered psychologists in Nova Scotia and several other provinces in Canada.

The Mount houses 16 research centres and institutes.

The Department of Applied Human Nutrition has an accredited dietetic program. The University is accredited by a professional organization such as the Dietitians of Canada, and the university's graduates may subsequently become registered dietitians.

Mount Saint Vincent University is the only university in Canada to offer a Master of Public Relations program (MPR). The MPR program graduated its first class in October 2009. The Canadian Public Relations Society (CPRS) recognizes MSVU's MPR program for excellence in PR education in its Pathways to the Profession guide.

=== Support services ===
Academic programs are supported by electronic and print research resources through the MSVU Library. Research services include drop-in reference assistance, research appointments, and classroom workshops.

January 2019 marked the 40th anniversary of the Mount's co-operative education program. It is the longest-standing nationally accredited co-op program in the Maritime Provinces, offering an optional co-op program in 1979 for students in the Bachelor of Business Administration program. Four decades later, more than 8,000 Business Administration, Public Relations, and Tourism & Hospitality Management students have taken their learning from the classroom to the workplace, completing paid work terms in industries related to their field of study (today, co-op is a required part of the Public Relations and Tourism & Hospitality Management degrees). Since 2014, the Mount Co-op Office has also enabled experiential opportunities for Arts and Science students through an Arts & Science Internship Program.

Mount Saint Vincent University is home to the Centre for Women in Business, a not-for-profit university business development centre (UBDC) that assists with entrepreneurial activities in and throughout Nova Scotia. Founded in 1992 by the University's Department of Business & Tourism, the organization remains the only UBDC in Canada with a primary focus on women. The Centre has served more than 7500 clients over the past 18 years.

== Art Gallery ==
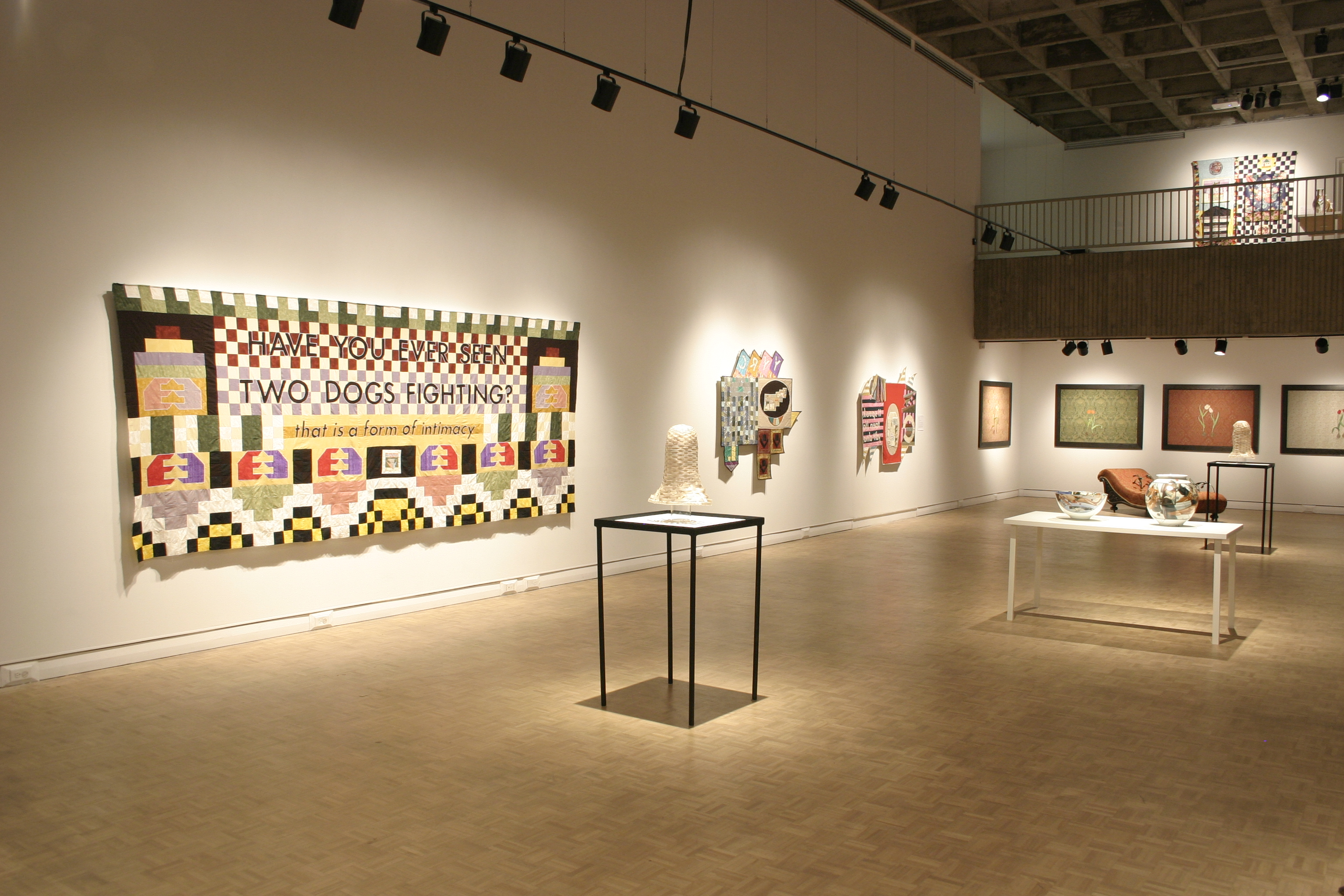
One of two levels of the Mount's Art Gallery, located in Seton Academic Centre.

The Mount Saint Vincent University Art Gallery is located on the first floor of Seton Academic Centre. It opened in 1971 as a resource for Mount Saint Vincent, the communities served by the university, artists, Metro Halifax residents, and the art public. Admission is always free of charge.

MSVU Art Gallery reflects the University's educational aims by devoting a significant part of its activities to the representation of women as cultural subjects and producers. Its exhibitions explore various forms of cultural production, highlighting the achievements of Nova Scotian artists and themes relevant to academic programs offered by the university.

== Wikuom ==
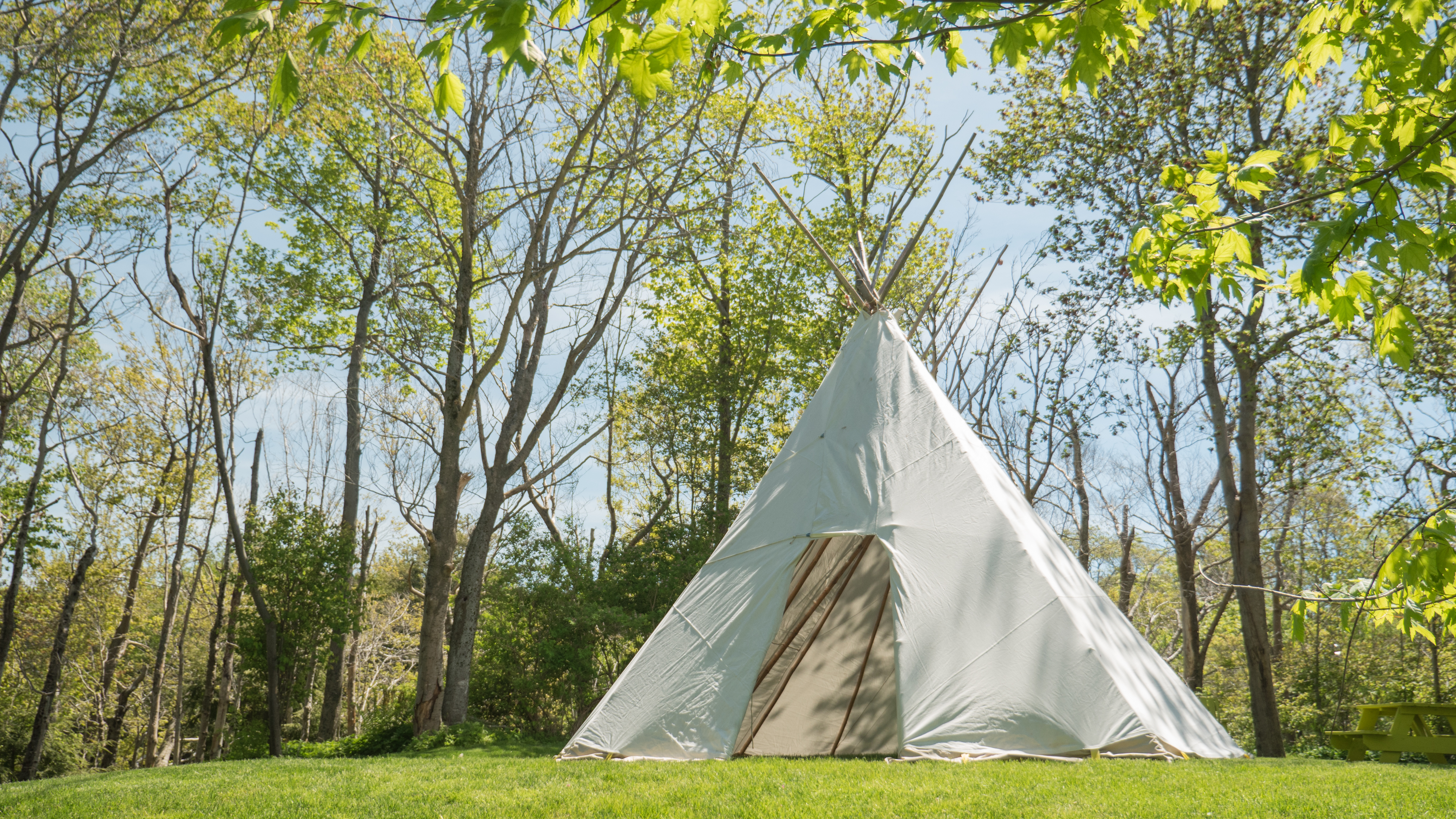
A wikuom raised beside Seton Road at Mount Saint Vincent University

The Mount was the first Nova Scotia university to add a wikuom to its campus facilities. First raised on June 12, 2017, the wikuom is a welcoming traditional Mi'kmaq space where Indigenous and non-Indigenous communities can gather and learn together.

The Mount is also home to the Aboriginal Student Centre (ASC), which is home to ASC staff who provide academic advising, counseling, and other support services to students. The ASC hosts several events, including the Mount's Mid-Winter Feast, Blanket Exercises, Cultural Workshops, Mini-Mount Camps, and more.

== Athletics ==
The school's athletic teams, known as the Mystics, compete in the Atlantic Colleges Athletic Association (ACAA) in basketball, soccer, cross country, and women's volleyball. The Mystics hold championship titles in all sports.

== Notable alumni ==
Notable graduates of the Mount include:

- Patricia Arab
- Joanne Bernard
- Carolyn Bertram
- Ryan Cochrane
- Rafah DiConstanzo
- Barrie Dunn
- Alice Mary Hagen
- Leroy Lowe
- Catherine McKinnon
- Paul D. McNair
- Marianna O'Gallagher
- Yvonne Pothier
- Iain Rankin
- Corrine Sparks

== See also ==
- List of current and historical women's universities and colleges
- Higher education in Nova Scotia
- List of universities in Nova Scotia
- Canadian Interuniversity Sport
- Canadian government scientific research organizations
- Canadian university scientific research organizations
- Canadian industrial research and development organizations
- List of colleges and universities named after people
