= Colomé =

Coordinates: 25°30′40″S 66°23′40″W

- Municipality and village
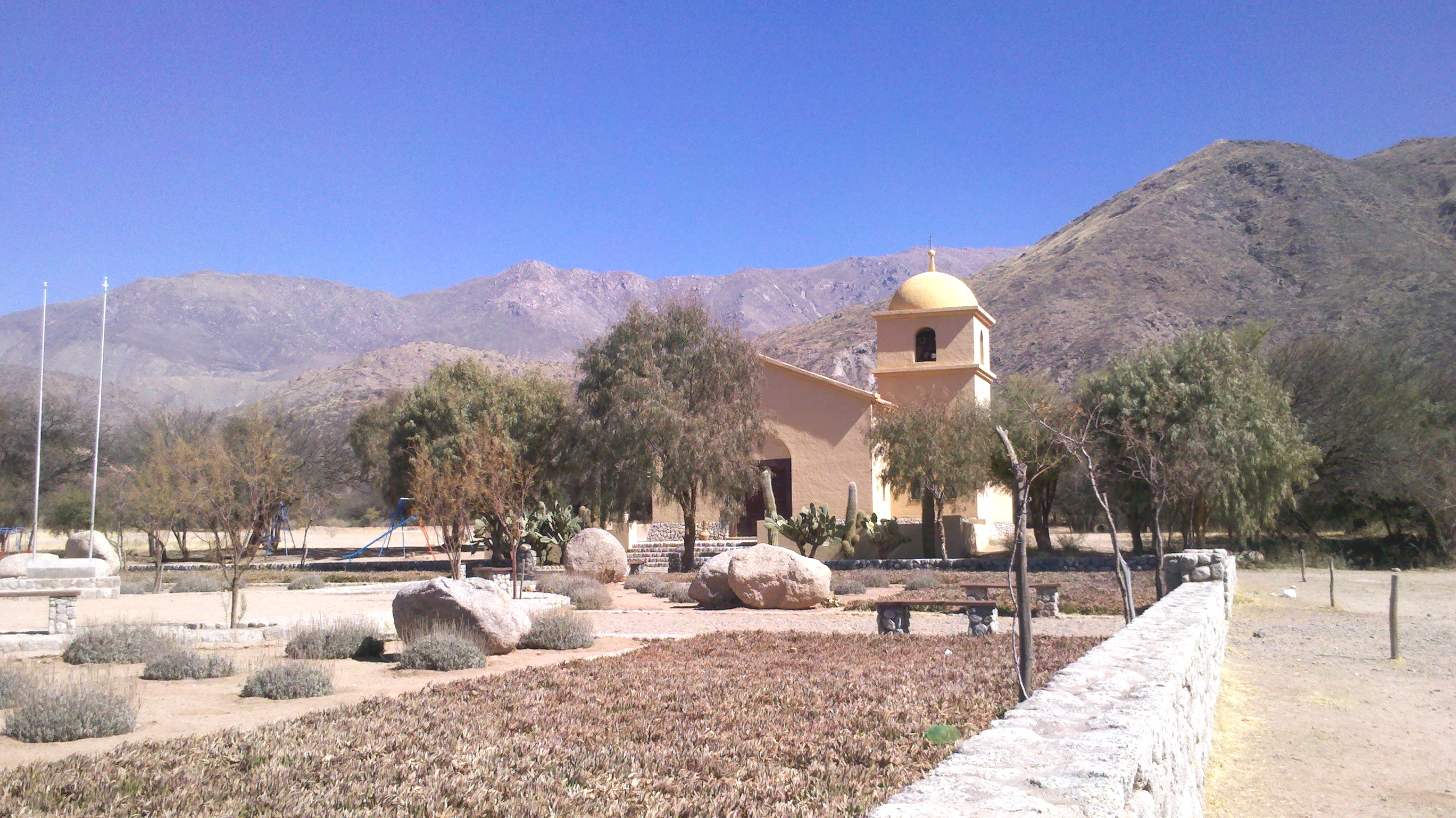
- Chapel in Colomé
- Interactive map of Colomé
- Country: Argentina
- Province: Salta Province
- Established: 1831
- Elevation: 7,450 ft (2,270 m)

Population
  - Total: 400
- Time zone: UTC−3 (ART)

Colomé is a village and rural municipality in Salta Province in northwestern Argentina. It is located about 20 km from Molinos, Salta. This settlement was established by the last Spanish governor of Salta, Nicolás Severo de Isasmendi, in 1831. His daughter Ascención imported grapevines from France and planted them in the area at an average altitude of 2200 m, which is extremely high for viticulture. The climate is dry and arid, and temperature differences between day and night can be high. The winters are very cold.

Under these conditions, growing grapes is a challenge, but it has the advantage that insects, pests and diseases are less common. Swiss vigneron Donald M. Hess bought the Bodega Colomé and vineyards in the neighbourhood in 2001. One of his vineyards is at 3100 m (approx. 10,000 ft), the highest elevation worldwide. Its wine is called Altura Máxima. In addition, Donald M. Hess has built a museum in Colomé dedicated to the American artist James Turrell, which opened in 2009.
