= USS Woolsey (DD-77) =

Wickes-class destroyer

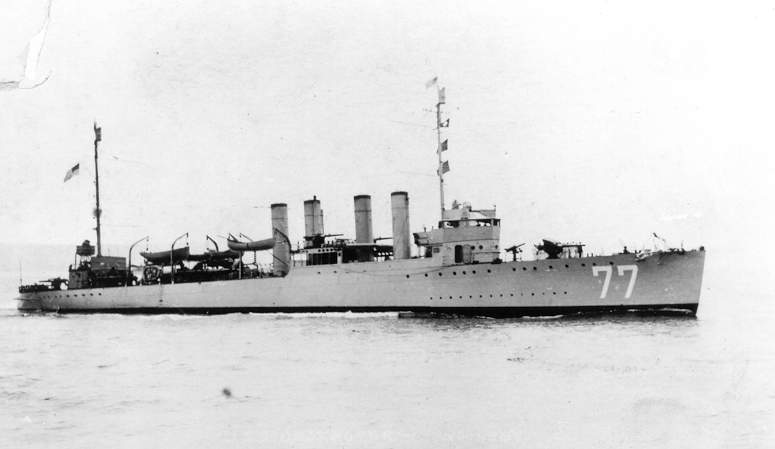
- USS Woolsey

History

United States
- Name: Woolsey
- Namesake: Melancthon Taylor Woolsey
- Builder: Bath Iron Works
- Laid down: 1 November 1917
- Launched: 17 September 1918
- Commissioned: 30 September 1918
- Fate: Sank following collision, 21 February 1921

General characteristics
- Class & type: Wickes-class destroyer
- Displacement: 1,154 long tons (1,173 t)
- Length: 314 ft 4 1/2 in (95.8 m)
- Beam: 30 ft 11 1/4 in (9.4 m)
- Draft: 9 ft 8 1/2 in (3.0 m)
- Propulsion: 2 × steam engines; 2 × shafts
- Speed: 35.33 kn (40.66 mph; 65.43 km/h)
- Complement: 131 officers and enlisted
- Armament: 4 × 4 in (102 mm)/50 caliber guns; 2 × 1-pounder guns; 12 × 21 in (533 mm) torpedo tubes; 2 × depth charge tracks; 1 × Y-gun

The first USS Woolsey (DD-77) was a Wickes-class destroyer in the United States Navy during World War I. She was named for Melancthon Taylor Woolsey.

== History ==
Woolsey was laid down on 1 November 1917 at Bath, Maine, by the Bath Iron Works. The ship was launched on 17 September 1918, sponsored by Mrs. Elise Campau Wells. The destroyer was commissioned on 30 September 1918, Lieutenant Commander Frederick V. McNair, Jr. in command.

After trials out of Bath and outfitting at the Boston Navy Yard and the Newport Torpedo Station, Woolsey headed for New York on 9 October to join the battleship Virginia before sailing for Europe. On 13 October, she and Virginia departed New York harbor in the screen of Convoy HX 52. After a relatively uneventful voyage, the convoy was turned over to a British escort force on 22 October. Woolsey then set course for Buncrana, located in the far northern portion of Ireland, and arrived there on 23 October. Two days later, she departed Buncrana and stood down the Irish Sea en route to Ponta Delgada in the Azores. After fueling at Ponta Delgada on 30 October, the destroyer continued her voyage home and reentered New York on 5 November. After about a month at New York, during which time hostilities ended under the armistice of 11 November, Woolsey left New York on her way back to Europe to join the American naval contingent assigned there for postwar duty. She arrived in Brest, France on 20 December and reported for duty to the Commander, Naval Forces Europe.

For the next seven months, she performed various missions for the United States' naval establishment in Europe. Her primary mission consisted of runs between Brest and ports in southern England – notably Plymouth and Southampton – transporting passengers and mail. On 11 March 1919, she was one of the four American destroyers to escort George Washington into Brest when that ship arrived with President Woodrow Wilson embarked. After a four-month return to cross-channel runs between England and France, Woolsey was honored a second time when she was assigned duty as one of George Washington's escorts for President Wilson's return voyage to the U.S. from the Versailles peace conference. She departed Brest late in June 1919 in company with George Washington and arrived in Hampton Roads on 8 July.

Ten days later, Woolsey put to sea again bound for a new assignment – the Pacific Fleet. She reached Panama on 24 July, transited the Panama Canal, and headed for maneuvers in the Hawaiian Islands. At the completion of those maneuvers, she returned to the continental United States at San Diego. On 31 May 1920, the destroyer was placed out of commission at the Mare Island Navy Yard – probably for an extensive overhaul because she was recommissioned again on 20 October. For the remainder of her relatively brief career, Woolsey operated with the Pacific Fleet along the western coast of North America. While operating off the Pacific coast of Panama near Coiba Island early on the morning of 26 February 1921, Woolsey was cut in half during a collision with the merchant ship SS Steel Inventor and sank. There were 100 survivors, 17 injured, and 16 killed. Only one body was recovered. Survivors were rescued by her sister ship, Aaron Ward.
