= Ian McNair =

Ian Wallace McNair (23 October 1933 – 30 October 2007) was a market research expert in Australia, known in the Australian market research industry, through the work of his father Bill McNair and his own work.

== Family ==
When Ian was born in 1933, his father Bill received news that the advertising agency he worked at, JWT, had won the Kelloggs advertising contract. For this reason, Ian almost acquired the name Ian Kellogg. However the middle name Wallace was chosen for two reasons; it was the middle name of Bill's brother, but probably more so in recognition of William Wallace whose defeat of the English in 1298 was significant to the Scottish heritage of the McNair family.

== Career ==
In 1950, Ian started full-time study in Economics at University of Sydney but later reverted to part-time study while working at the accounting firm Holt and Thompson. He also did three months National Service at this time, where he was known as Gunner McNair or Private Eye McNair.

Influenced by his father, Ian joined the McNair Survey Pty Ltd in 1953, the market research business that Bill McNair and his business partner Gwen Nelson had bought from JWT. He joined initially on a trial six-week period as a clerk.

In 1953 TV arrived in Australia, and The McNair Survey supplied both radio and now TV ratings.

The McNair Survey began to work in political opinion polling, and in the 1955 Federal Election they correctly predicted that Federal Labor leader, Dr. H. V. Evatt would retain his hotly contested seat of Barton.

While Ian was a shareholder in the McNair Survey, by virtue of the fact that Gwen Nelson sold Ian a small parcel of shares, Bill and Gwen sold the McNair Survey to Ian McNair, in partnership with Ian Muir and Ian Pilz, known as the three Ians.

Under Ian McNair's leadership the organisation established offices in Melbourne and New Zealand. In 1973 the McNair Survey merged with their competitor, Anderson, to become the largest market research firm in Australia, with McNair Anderson providing the national radio ratings, TV ratings and national readership survey.

In 1980, Ian McNair sold 60% of McNair Anderson to AGB Research.

At the beginning of the 1980s McNair Anderson bought AGB McNair Hong Kong, and a few years later, SRG Australia and Spectrum Research, for which Paul Korbel was a member of staff. AGB marginalised the original leadership team over time and McNair finally left the organisation in November 1985. AGB was acquired by ACNielsen shortly after that. In 1986 McNair, together with Korbel, Ian Bell and Mike Larbalestier, formed Quadrant Research, essentially a partnership of four independent researchers sharing resources and based in Falcon Street, Crows Nest.

In that year McNair suffered a serious but non-fatal heart attack.

At Quadrant Research Matt Balogh joined in 1998 initially as marketing director and later to become general manager. The following year Korbel negotiated the sale of Quadrant to The Gallup Organization, resulting in the dismissal of nearly all the staff in 2001.

After Quadrant Research disbanded in 2001, Balogh formed Ingenuity Research and McNair resumed trading as McNair Research on his own but working from Ingenuity Research's offices and using their services to conduct interviewing. They formally merged to become McNair Ingenuity Research in 2003.

McNair Ingenuity Research today a market research and social research company specialising in media, government, advertising, health and safety and international research. The company publishes of the McNair Gallup Poll.

== See also ==
- Australian Market and Social Research Society Limited
