= Leroy Lowe =

Canadian biologist (born 1963)

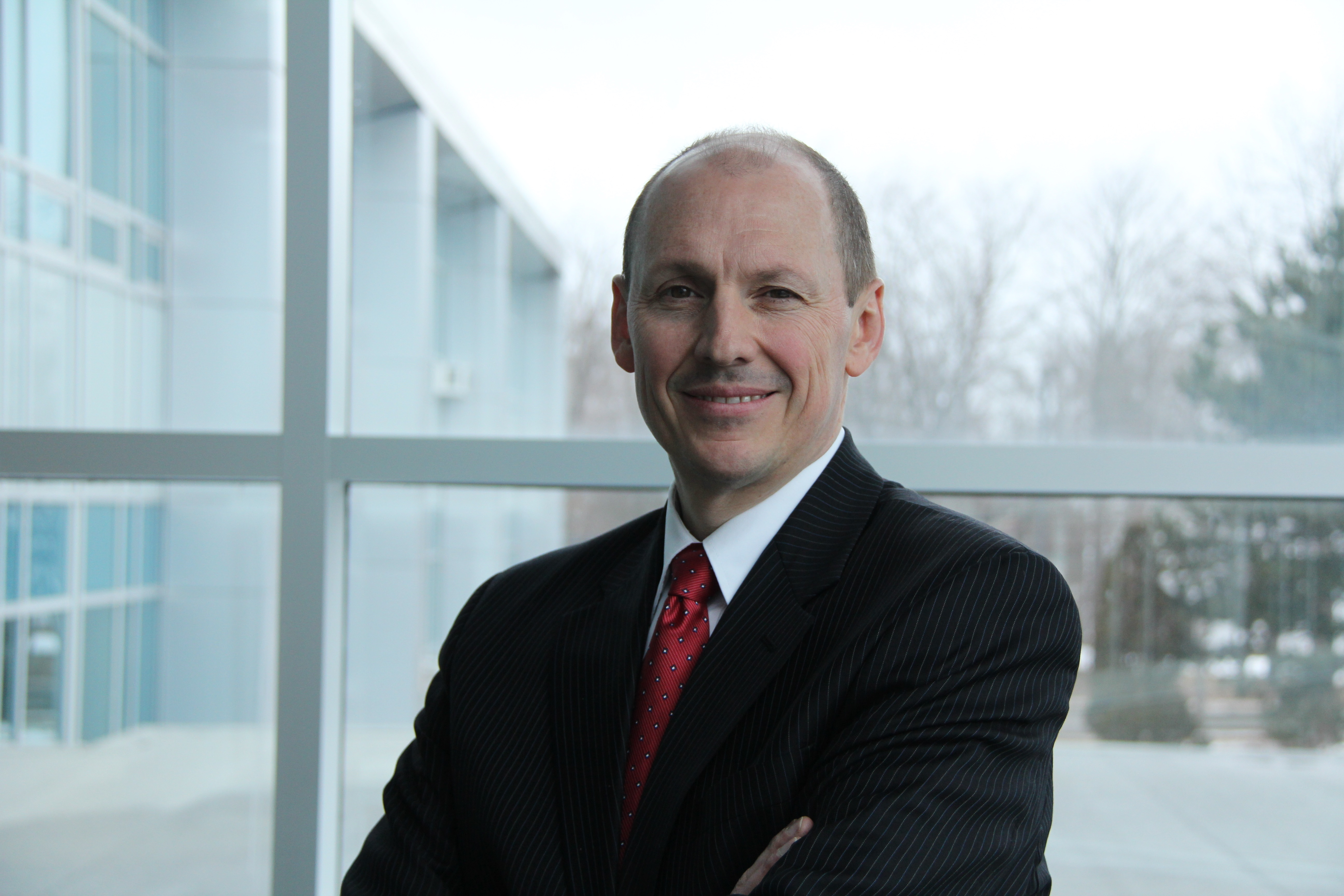
- Born: Leroy James Lowe; May 22, 1963 (age 63); Berwick, Nova Scotia
- Education: Saint Mary's University; Mount Saint Vincent University; Lancaster University
- Known for: "Low Dose Theory of Carcinogenesis" "Broad Spectrum Approach to Cancer Therapy" "The Human Affectome"
- Scientific career
- Fields: Cancer, Neuroscience
- Thesis: Towards an integrated understanding of low dose chemical exposures in the development of human cancer
- Doctoral advisor: Frank Martin

Leroy James Lowe (born May 22, 1963) is a Canadian biologist best known for his "Low Dose Theory of Carcinogenesis", the "Broad-spectrum approach to Cancer Therapy", and for his efforts to define "The Human Affectome" in the field of neuroscience. He is the Co-Founder and President of Getting to Know Cancer, the Founder and President of Neuroqualia, and a faculty member at the International Business at the Nova Scotia Community College.

== Education and early life ==
In 1986, Lowe obtained a B.Sc. and a Diploma in Engineering at Saint Mary's University and then joined the Canadian Airforce. While in the Airforce, Lowe trained to be a pilot on the CT114 Tutor Jet and eventually he become an Aerospace Engineering Officer at National Defense Headquarters in Ottawa where he worked with scientists who were focused on research and development projects to create airborne equipment that could be used to track Soviet nuclear submarines.

After the Airforce, Lowe worked for Sparton of Canada (a subsidiary of Sparton Corporation), a company that produced oceanographic equipment. He subsequently started an international business program at the Nova Scotia Community College and while working there he earned a Master's Degree in Adult Education at Mount Saint Vincent University, an MBA at Saint Mary's University, and he began a PhD in Management at SMU.

Lowe earned a PhD by Publication at Lancaster University in Lancaster, England. His thesis was entitled "Towards an integrated understanding of low dose chemical exposures in the development of human cancer".

== Scientific career ==
After 8 years of self-study, Lowe identified two major challenges in cancer research. First of all, he believed that chemicals from plants and foods could be used to enhance cancer therapy. He also believed that everyday exposures to common environmental chemicals (e.g., pesticides, food additives, etc.) might be conspiring to cause cancer.

Lowe reached out to Theo Colborn (an expert in low dose chemical exposures) for help in 2011. She introduced him to Michael Gilbertson and together Lowe and Gilbertson co-founded Getting to Know Cancer (an NGO), formed an advisory board, and the two of them used a form of crowd-sourcing to launch the Halifax Project in 2012, an initiative involving 350 scientists in 31 countries. The project was aimed at solving the two challenges that Lowe had identified.

=== Low Dose Theory of Carcinogenesis ===
In one half of the Halifax Project, 174 scientists from 26 countries were recruited to assess the potential role of low-dose chemical mixtures on the Hallmarks of Cancer. The aim of the project was to produce a series of overarching reviews of the cancer hallmarks that would collectively assess biologically disruptive chemicals that might be acting in concert with other seemingly innocuous chemicals and contributing to various aspects of carcinogenesis.

Researchers were organized into twelve teams, and in total, the researchers reviewed 85 examples of chemicals for actions on key pathways/mechanisms related to carcinogenesis. The taskforce concluded that low-dose exposures to disruptive chemicals that are not individually carcinogenic may be capable of instigating and/or enabling carcinogenesis.

=== Broad Spectrum Approach to Cancer Therapy ===
In the other half of the Halifax Project, Lowe focused on the fact that cancer research had centered primarily on molecular targets for therapeutics, which had achieved notable successes in some cancers, but noted that disease relapse is still common in many cancers due to disease heterogeneity. Lowe noted that attempts to treat this sort of relapse often involves simple combinations of chemotherapy that cannot reach enough molecular targets so many refractory cancers are unstoppable.

In this effort, 180 researchers were organized into twelve teams using the Hallmarks of Cancer as an organizing framework. The researchers then tried to identify friendlier chemicals, many of which come from plants and foods that could be combined to reach many targets (key anticancer receptors, pathways, and mechanisms) with little to no toxicity at therapeutic doses. This was intended to address the two major issues of therapeutic resistance and cost.

The interdisciplinary teams reviewed each hallmark area and nominated a wide range of high-priority targets (74 in total) that could be modified to improve patient outcomes. For these targets, corresponding low-toxicity therapeutic approaches were then suggested, many of which were phytochemicals. The task force concluded that a broad-spectrum approach should be feasible from a safety standpoint, that the approach would be relatively inexpensive to implement, and that it should help us address stages and types of cancer that lack conventional treatment, and potentially reduce risk of relapse.

=== The Human Affectome ===
Lowe's research and focus on feelings and emotions began in 2001 when he was working on his PhD in Management. Although his first PhD attempt was interrupted, he explained that while he spent a decade-and-a-half focused on cancer research, he continued to follow the research on feelings and emotions and ultimately had the idea that affective neuroscientists needed a comprehensive and robust functional model that could serve as a common focal point for research in the field. To develop this model, Lowe used the same approach that he used for the Halifax project. He launched an NGO called Neuroqualia and described the problem on a dedicated project website. He coined the term Human Affectome to describe the entire complex of affective experience and then recruited an advisory board, along with 12 team leaders and 12 teams to help him develop a functional model that could capture the scope of the research being undertaken in this field. Neuroscience and Biobehavioral Reviews agreed to create a special issue for the project, guest editors were used, and so far, 12 open access articles have been published by the 12 teams.

== Selected works ==
=== Low Dose Theory of Carcinogenesis ===
- Assessing the carcinogenic potential of low-dose exposures to chemical mixtures in the environment: the challenge ahead, 2015, WH Goodson III, L Lowe, et al, Carcinogenesis 36 (Suppl_1), S254-S296
- Low-dose mixture hypothesis of carcinogenesis workshop: scientific underpinnings and research recommendations, 2017, MF Miller, WH Goodson III et al, Environmental health perspectives 125 (2), 163-169
- Testing the low dose mixtures hypothesis from the Halifax project, 2020, WH Goodson, L Lowe, M Gilbertson, DO Carpenter, Reviews on Environmental Health 35 (4), 333-357

=== Broad-Spectrum Approach to Cancer Therapy ===
- Plant-based anticancer drug development: advancements and hurdles, 2012, A Amin, L Lowe, Journal of Gastrointestinal & Digestive System 2 (5)
- Designing a broad-spectrum integrative approach for cancer prevention and treatment, 2015, KI Block et al, Seminars in cancer biology 35, S276-S304
- Affordable cancer medications are within reach but we need a different approach, 2016, DW Felsher, L Lowe, J Clin Oncol 34, 2194-2195

=== The Human Affectome ===
- The role of hedonics in the Human Affectome, 2019, S Becker et al, Neuroscience & Biobehavioral Reviews 102, 221-241
- Physiological feelings, 2019, EF Pace-Schott, et al, Neuroscience & Biobehavioral Reviews 103, 267-304
- The neuroscience of social feelings: mechanisms of adaptive social functioning, 2021, PJ Eslinger, et al, Neuroscience & Biobehavioral Reviews, Sep, 128, 592-620
- The neuroscience of positive emotions and affect: Implications for cultivating happiness and wellbeing 2021, R Alexander, et al, Neuroscience & Biobehavioral Reviews 121, 220-249
- Anticipatory feelings: neural correlates and linguistic markers, 2020, E Stefanova, et al., Neuroscience & Biobehavioral Reviews 113, 308-324
- A sensorimotor control framework for understanding emotional communication and regulation, 2020, JHG Williams, et al, Neuroscience & Biobehavioral Reviews 112, 503-518
- Neuroimaging the consciousness of self: Review, and conceptual-methodological framework, 2020, P Frewen, et al, Neuroscience & Biobehavioral Reviews 112, 164-212
- The neuroscience of sadness: A multidisciplinary synthesis and collaborative review, 2020, JA Arias, et al, Neuroscience & Biobehavioral Reviews 111, 199-228
- The feeling of anger: From brain networks to linguistic expressions, 2020, N Alia-Klein, et al, Neuroscience & Biobehavioral Reviews 108, 480-497
- Current understanding of fear learning and memory in humans and animal models and the value of a linguistic approach for analyzing fear learning and memory in humans, 2019, J Raber, et al, Neuroscience & Biobehavioral Reviews 105, 136-177
