= Robin McNair =

Robin John McNair DFC and Bar
- Robin McNair in RAF uniform 1942
- Born: 21 May 1918; Rio de Janeiro, Brazil
- Died: 18 May 1996 (aged 77); Chichester, England, UK
- Burial place: Church Norton, England, UK
- Spouse(s): Estelle (née Townsend); 7 children
- Military career
- Allegiance: United Kingdom
- Branch: Royal Air Force
- Service years: 1939–1945
- Rank: Squadron Leader
- Commands: 247 Squadron, 74 Squadron, 124 Wing
- Conflicts: Battle of Britain, Dieppe Raid, D-Day, Falaise pocket
- Awards: Distinguished Flying Cross x 2
- Other work: Airline executive

Squadron Leader Robin John McNair, DFC and Bar (21 May 1918 – 18 May 1996) was a prominent Royal Air Force fighter pilot during the Second World War. After the war he enjoyed a long and successful career in civil aviation as a senior figure in BEA, later to become British Airways.

== Second World War ==
In February 1939, seven months before World War II began in Europe, McNair joined the Royal Air Force Volunteer Reserve and was selected for pilot training, being called up into the RAF six months later. During the Battle of Britain in 1940 he served first with No. 3 Squadron (fighter) and then No. 249 Squadron (also fighter), where he served under Squadron Leader John Grandy, later Marshal of the RAF. At this time No. 249 Squadron adopted the motto Nocturni Obambulamus (We Stalk by Night) and was charged with the air defence of North-West England. In March 1941 McNair shot down a Heinkel He 111 bomber over Liverpool. The dangers and complications of this attack were such that it received national press coverage; and was held up as an exceptional success by Douglas Bader in his book: Fight for the sky which provided a detailed description.

In 1940 he regularly flew nightfighter operations during the Blitz. In 1941 his operations included leading intruder attacks on enemy bases in France, Belgium and The Netherlands. In 1942 he was awarded the DFC for his part in warding off air raids over England and for his role as a member of No. 87 Squadron flying Hawker Hurricanes in the 1942 Dieppe raid. He received a bar to his DFC in September 1944 from George VI after commanding No. 247 squadron in the 'Death and Glory' operations of Hawker Typhoons (Tiffy in RAF slang), in the 1944 Normandy invasion.

Having supported the D-Day landings on 6 June 1944, the squadron moved to France two weeks later and then flew armed reconnaissance operations in support of the advancing Allied armies through France, Belgium, the Netherlands and on into Germany. Later that year he took part in Operation Crossbow flying 'noball' sorties against V-weapon sites. He was acting Wing Commander during the devastating raid by 124 Wing in Hawker Typhoons on the German Seventh Army at the Falaise Pocket in Normandy in 1944, an action in which Field Marshal Erwin Rommel was severely injured and one of the bloodiest engagements of the Normandy campaign.

"The battlefield at Falaise was unquestionably one of the greatest 'killing fields' of any of the war areas", Eisenhower noted in his memoirs: "Forty-eight hours after the closing of the gap I was conducted through it on foot, to encounter scenes that could be described only by Dante".

During the war McNair became a member of the Caterpillar Club for those who have successfully used a parachute to bail out of a disabled aircraft, having been forced to bail out of a damaged plane twice during combat. Whilst nightfighting over Bristol in his Hurricane in 1942, McNair's parachute failed to deploy until immediately before he hit the ground. In July 1944 his 7-ton Typhoon fighter-bomber laden with rockets and bombs was disabled by enemy ground fire. He managed to glide it 15 miles across occupied France to land it undamaged behind Allied lines. He was posted as Chief Flying Instructor before returning to combat duties. In 1945 he commanded No. 74 Squadron, one of the first RAF squadrons equipped with the UK’s first jet fighter the Gloster Meteor, also the Allies' first operational jet aircraft. Altogether McNair flew almost 300 operational sorties. He was one of the few surviving fighter pilots from the Battle of Britain still in operational combat in late 1944 and up to the end of the war.

== Post-war ==
After the war McNair entered the civil aviation industry joining British European Airways (BEA) which merged with BOAC to form British Airways (BA) in 1974. He played an important role towards re-establishing post-war diplomatic and commercial links between Britain and Federal Germany; and in facilitating commercial diplomatic channels of communication with countries emerging from the political upheavals of the war.

From 1951–56 he was deputy to Lord Amherst, director of BEA's Associated Companies, and helped to establish smooth relations between the airline's foreign subsidiaries. He worked closely in Cyprus after its independence with the most senior political and commercial personages in the country including Archbishop (later President) Makarios; and with Aristotle Onassis on the complex negotiations that led to a BA/Olympic Airways consortium for the hire of aircraft and exploitation of European and Mediterranean routes. In his long career at BEA and BA he was to become one of its chief commercial negotiators before retiring in 1979.

In 1990 Bishop Cormac Murphy-O'Connor (later Cardinal Archbishop of Westminster) said of McNair: "His life and career exemplified what was best in English and Catholic tradition." Biblical scholar Dom Bernard Orchard (OSB) said of McNair: “I know of no-one in my whole acquaintance more deserving of being honoured by his country for his integrity and citizenship.”

== Personal life ==
McNair was born in Rio de Janeiro, his forebears having moved in the 1840s to Brazil from Glasgow, where they were prominent in civic and commercial life. He was educated at Douai School, Berkshire. A devoutly religious man, during his war years he would always insist that Mass be held for dead crew members any time an enemy plane had been brought down. In post-war years he helped to organise displaced persons camps in Western Europe. After his retirement in 1979 McNair became involved with many church, charitable and ex-Service organisations. He also maintained close contact with his old school and was elected President of the Douai Society (1991–93).

== Family ==
In 1940 Robin McNair married Estelle Townsend, great niece of Surgeon-General Sir Edmond Townsend; they had seven children, including author and lawyer Duncan McNair.

== Death ==
McNair died on 18 May 1996, three days short of his 78th birthday, following a stroke. He was buried at Church Norton close to the seaside at Selsey, West Sussex, where he had been commanding officer and had flown several missions over the English Channel before D-Day in his Typhoon.

== Legacy ==
He was strongly associated with supporting pro-life causes. He was a patron and supporter of SPUC, whose Robin McNair Prize, set up in his memory and presented annually, is open to children between the ages of 14 and 18 writing an essay about issues affecting the sanctity of life. He founded a number of charities and caring bodies in his later years including the Society of St Vincent de Paul; he became secretary of St Benedict's School, Ealing, chairman at St Augustine's Priory and the most senior president of Douai School.

In 1998 a blue plaque was erected in his honour at a new road in the London Borough of Ealing, McNair Road. (McNair Close, Selsey and McNair Court, Hove are also named in his honour.)

== See also ==
- List of RAF aircrew in the Battle of Britain

== Links ==
- "A flying life", Aeroplane Monthly tribute to McNair, December 1996, pp. 44–46
- Citation for his first DFC reads
  “This officer is a most capable operational pilot. In night-flying operations, he has destroyed a Heinkel 111 and probably destroyed 2 Junkers 88's. In the combined operations at Dieppe, his cool and courageous work set an inspiring example."
- "The Airmen's Stories – Sgt. R J McNair" (a reproduction of his obituary), Daily Telegraph
- "Battle of Britain hero honoured", Catholic Herald, 17 October 1997
- No 247 China-British Squadron history
