= MacNair =

Scottish surname now widespread across the world

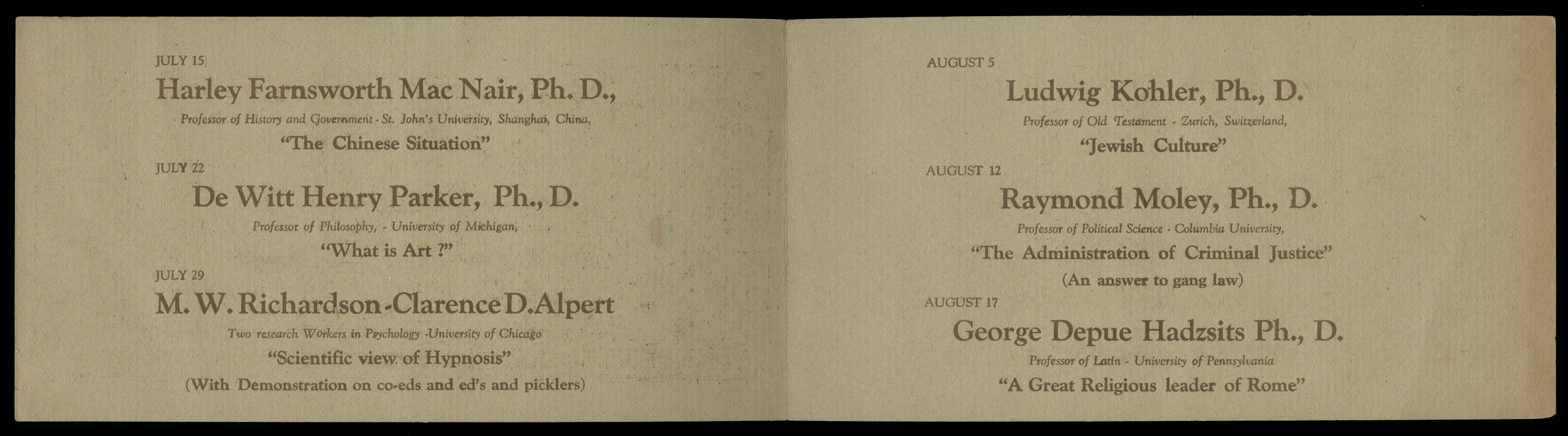

MacNair is a surname. Notable people with the surname include:

- Frances Macdonald MacNair (1873–1921), Scottish artist of the "Glasgow Style"
- Herbert MacNair, Scottish artist
- Peter Macnair (born 1940), Canadian anthropologist
- Rachel MacNair (born 1958), American sociologist and psychologist

Fictional characters with the surname include:

- Jamie Macnair, character in The Curse of the Viking Grave
- Sir Kevin Dean de Courtney MacNair of MacNair, alias of a character in Napoleon Disentimed
- Walden Macnair, character from the Harry Potter series

== See also ==
- McNair, surname
