= Duncan McNair =

British litigation lawyer

Duncan William McNair KHS is a commercial and corporate litigation lawyer, author and charity campaigner, the youngest of seven children of Squadron Leader (and Acting Wing Commander) Robin McNair, DFC and Bar, and his wife, Estelle (née Townsend).

== Life and career ==
McNair was educated as a State Scholar at St Benedict's School, and at the University of Bristol. He has practised City-oriented litigation at Lovells (now Hogan Lovells), at Lawrence Graham LLP, and, since 2019, at Spencer West LLP, specialising in major commercial and corporate litigation and public law cases, domestically and internationally, and contested wills and probate cases involving substantial estates.

=== Protection of Life During Pregnancy Bill ===
In 2011 McNair acted for the successful third-party interveners in A, B & C –v- Republic of Ireland, before the Grand Chamber of the European Court of Human Rights (ECHR). This was a landmark case in which the court dismissed a wide range of complaints by A, B and C, who had claimed lack of access to abortion facilities in Ireland. In light of the ABC case, the Irish Government introduced the Protection of Life During Pregnancy Bill to detail the circumstances under which abortions in Ireland could be legally performed. This passed into law in July 2013.

=== Other notable cases ===
In 2012 he acted for successful interveners in BPAS –v- Secretary of State for Health, in the Administrative Court in London.

He was named "Lawyer in the News" (Law Society Gazette) and "Lawyer of the Week" (The Times) for his work in these cases.

=== The McNair Inquiry and Report ===
In 2012 McNair was appointed by the RSPCA to chair a national review of its Freedom Food scheme. Serving on his panel were former Cabinet minister and Secretary of State at DEFRA, the Rt Hon (now Dame) Caroline Spelman (MP), and Professor David Main (BVetMed, PhD, MRCVS), Reader in Animal Welfare and Behaviour at the University of Bristol Veterinary School. Evidence was taken from all areas of animal food production, distribution and retail and from numerous interested parties. The McNair Report was presented in May 2013. Its recommendations were unanimously approved by the Council of Trustees of the RSPCA the following month. The RSPCA later announced it was formulating a strategy to build on the recommendations of the McNair Report which formed the basis of their RSPCA Assured scheme.

=== Charity work ===
McNair undertakes pro bono charity work, especially in the field of local communities and animal welfare. In 2015 he founded Save The Asian Elephants, a coalition of politicians, academics, lawyers, field experts and campaigners working to protect the Asian elephant from abuse and extinction.

In 2023 STAE was named amongst the 10 best charities in the world for the impact of its work for elephants.

He also speaks and publishes on issues relating to animal welfare in the context of food production, distribution and retail and problems associated with livestock supply chains.

== Books ==
McNair has written two books, The Morello Letters – Pen pal to the stars and More Morello Letters – Pen pal to the superstars under the pseudonym of a fictional Italian immigrant, "Mrs Morello, a lover of all things British", who struggles to understand some of the more idiosyncratic aspects of British life. Both books have been widely reviewed. In 2012 The Morello Letters was included by BBC Radio 4 listeners amongst their funniest books ever in Open Book’s Listeners’ Funniest Books hosted by Mariella Frostrup.
