= Edmond Townsend =

Sir Edmond Townsend KCB CMG
- Sir Edmond Townsend in army uniform, circa 1904.
- Born: 22 April 1845; Cork, Ireland
- Died: 2 January 1917 (aged 71); Clontymon, County Cork
- Military career
- Rank: Surgeon-General
- Unit: Army Medical Services

Surgeon-General Sir Edmond Townsend KCB CMG (22 April 1845 – 2 January 1917) was an Anglo-Irish medical officer in the British Army. He joined the British Army in 1867 and in a career spanning 38 years rose to become surgeon-general, the most senior ranking medical officer in the British army.

Townsend served in nine overseas campaigns with the British Army from 1867 to 1902 later becoming Principal Medical Officer of Netley Military Hospital, a role he held until his retirement in 1905. He was decorated several times for bravery during his army career and was mentioned in company dispatches on five occasions. He was knighted in the Order of the Bath in 1904 in recognition of his distinguished army career during which he had been both severely and dangerously wounded in action. After his retirement in 1905 he lived in London and Ireland, where he died at Clontymon, County Cork on 2 January 1917, aged 71.

== Early life and education ==
Townsend was born in Cork the fifth of 13 children of surgeon William C. Townsend of Cork. Following his father into medicine, he took degrees of M.A., M.D. and M.Ch. at Queen's University of Ireland.

== Career ==
Townsend joined the British army as an assistant surgeon on 1 April 1867. He was appointed surgeon on 1 March 1873, surgeon major on 1 April 1879, brigade-surgeon-lieutenant-colonel on 1 April 1893 and surgeon-general in the Army Medical Service on 25 September 1901. In May 1898 made a Companion of the Order of the Bath, and in April 1901 he was made a Companion of the Most Distinguished Order of St. Michael and St. George.

In October 1902 he was appointed principal medical officer of Netley Military Hospital.

He was appointed KCB on 24 June 1904. and on 22 April 1905 he retired from service.

== Military Record ==
Abyssinia 1867-68 Battle of Arogee, received Abyssinian War medal.

Perak expedition in the Malay peninsula 1875-76, severely wounded. Medal with Perak clasp. This was also the first time the British Indian army Gurkha Regiment was employed outside India.

Anglo-Zulu War 1879.1879 Zulu war Principal Medical Officer with Northern Column and subsequently Wood's Column, Medical Officer to 2nd/21st Foot, battle of Ulundi and operations against King Sekhukhune, mentioned in dispatches, South Africa medal with clasp.

Anglo-Egyptian War 1882 actions of Kassassin and battle of Tel el-Kebir, Egyptian War medal with clasp and Khedive's bronze star.

Third Anglo-Burmese War 1885-1886. Clasp to India General Service Medal.

The Ashanti Expedition also known as the Fourth Anglo-Ashanti War 1895-96. Mentioned in dispatches, Ashanti Star.

North-West Frontier 1897-98. Served under Sir William Lockheart as principal medical officer (P.M.O.) in the first Mohmand campaign, mentioned in dispatches. P.M.O. of 1st Division Tirah campaign. Actions of Samana and Arhanga passes and operations in Bazar Valley mentioned in dispatches, medal with two clasps and C.B.

Second Boer War 1899-1902. Served as P.M.O. of 1st Division and later P.M.O. Western District, actions of Enslin, Modder River, Magersfontein and Paardeberg and relief of Kimberley, mentioned in dispatches. From Lieutenant General Lord Methuen's dispatch, 23 November 1899:

By 10.30 my division was in camp, by 1 all my wounded were in a comfortable house being carefully tended, by 5 p.m. next day the hospital train conveyed the less severe cases to Orange River, the graver cases to Cape Town. This is the most perfect work I have ever heard of in war, and reflects the highest credit on Colonel Townsend.

Dangerously wounded 7 March 1902 at Klipdrift, mentioned in dispatches. From Lieutenant General Lord Methuen's dispatch Klerksdorp, 13 March 1902:

Colonel E Townsend, CB, my PMO, remained in the fighting line until he had received three wounds; he has, from the commencement of the campaign, always acted most gallantly.

(Battle of Tweebosch), Queen's medal with four clasps and King's medal with two clasps and C.M.G.

He left South Africa in SS Walmer Castle in April 1902, arriving at Southampton early the following month.

== Notes ==
Military offices
Preceded by ?	Surgeon General of the British Armed Forces; 1901–1905	Succeeded by ?
