= Paul D. McNair =

Paul McNair (born May 13, 1959) is a Canadian executive in that country's nonprofit sector.

He is primarily known for establishing the Names Project AIDS Memorial Quilt in Canada and was named Outstanding Professional Fundraising Executive by the Association of Fundraising Professionals in 2006. He served as president of the Association of Fundraising Professionals, Nova Scotia Chapter in 2008. In 2014 McNair was elected president of Dance Victoria.

== Biography ==
Born and raised in Halifax, Nova Scotia, McNair attended Halifax West High School. In 1977, he received the Birk's Medal for outstanding contribution to school affairs and the Soroptimist Youth Citizenship Award for contribution to the community. McNair attended Mount Saint Vincent University from 1977 to 1981, and was elected as president of the student union, the first male to hold this role in the university's history. He received the President's Prize in 1981.

== Career ==
Serving as the executive director for the Friends of the Citadel Society, McNair gained reputation for outstanding management skills in the nonprofit sector taking the organization from a grassroots level to a national award-winning society. He then became the first executive director of the Alzheimer Society of Nova Scotia and the executive director of AIDS Nova Scotia. Special events coordinated by McNair captured local, regional and national awards during this time including recognition by the Tourism Industry Association of Nova Scotia and the National Association of Cooperating Associations.

In 1990, McNair left Halifax to join the Farha Foundation in Montreal, Canada's first private AIDS foundation founded by Ron Farha, former President of Linda Lingerie. Between 1992 and 1997, McNair worked for the Kingston Symphony, Big Sisters of Ottawa and the Ottawa General Hospital. In 1997, he moved to Victoria, British Columbia to join the Camosun College Foundation. Heading the Foundation's private sector campaign to restore the college's historic Young Building, McNair was recognized by the Canadian Council for the Advancement of Education for 25 years in the industry.

In 2006, McNair completed his course work for his master's degree in Philanthropy & Development from Saint Mary's University of Minnesota in Winona.

The Parkinson Society Maritime Region named McNair CEO in 2003, a position he held until March 2009 when he became National Associate Director, Events Parkinson Society Canada setting anew record for funds raised through the charity's signature event, SuperWalk. Since May 2010 he has served as executive director of the Land Trust Alliance of British Columbia.

In 2006 McNair was awarded the "Outstanding Professional Fundraiser Award" by the Association of Fundraising Professionals in Nova Scotia.

McNair has served on the Board of Governors of Mount Saint Vincent University, Open Space Gallery Victoria, Metro Volunteer Resource Centre, National Association of Cooperating Associations, Victoria Dance Series, and numerous other organizations. He currently serves on the Natal Day Committee of the Halifax Regional Municipality. McNair also served on the Vancity Advisory Council for Victoria. He was elected President of Dance Victoria in 2014. He served for 6 years as a Trustee of the Greater Victoria Public Library. In 2018 he was elected President of the Victoria Arts Council.

He has been a practicing artist since 2009 largely in landscape and abstract painting. His award-winning works have been exhibited in Canada and the US and are in collections world-wide.

== See also ==
- Third sector
