= Australian Market and Social Research Society Limited =

The Australian Market and Social Research Society Limited (AMSRS) is a professional membership body that represents approximately 2,100 market research professionals who specialize in the standards and awareness of both market and social research in Australia. AMSRS states that its principal aims are to improve professional standards and ethics in marketing and social research and assist members in career development.

The AMSRS is a representative body for individual market and social research professionals while the Association of Market and Social Research Organisations (AMSRO) is the peak representative body for market and social research organisations in Australia. Together, the two peak societies represent the Australian industry and work to promote an understanding of market and social research, help set and maintain the highest ethical and technical standards as well and represent the industry's regulatory and legislative interests. The AMSRS works closely with the Association of Market and Social Research Organisations (AMSRO).

== Overview ==
According to the Asia-Pacific Regional Committee, the Australian Market Research Society (AMSRS) is the peak industry body representing market research professionals in Australia. Its primary role is to improve professional standards and ethics within the industry. It provides training and professional development services to members, and it also offers services to the public, including a 1300 phone line, allowing interested members of the public to check the bona fides of market research companies. The AMSRS has an active publishing arm and publishes several regular publications including the monthly practitioners' magazine, Research News, the peer-reviewed academic journal, Market and Social Research (formerly AJMSR) and an annual industry directory, the AMSRS Yearbook and Directory and occasional publications such as the Statistics E-Book. The society also commits to improving the public image of the market research industry in general.

Most professional associations globally place a high value on member accreditation, by examining knowledge and evaluating professional practice. The AMSRS is no exception. To that end, the AMSRS administers the industry-based professional accreditation program, known as the Qualified Practitioner of Market Research (QPMR), designed to ensure that practitioners maintain their experience and regularly update their knowledge. Some industry practitioners have noted that consultants with QPMR accreditation generally have more experience. The AMSRS holds an annual conference designed to allow members to exchange ideas and propose new research methodologies for which Conference Proceedings are also published annually. Academics and practitioners have noted that the theme of knowledge pervades the AMSRS Conferences. The AMSRS works closely with the Association of Market and Social Research Organisations (AMSRO).

== Corporate status ==
The Australian Market and Social Research Society Ltd is a limited by guarantee, unlisted public, non-profit, Australian public company. It was registered on 22 January 1985 and was issued with the Australian Company Number (ACN) 002882635. Its Australian Business Number (ABN) is 19002882635. The company currently has its headquarters in Glebe, New South Wales. In popular usage, it is known simply as the Australian Market and Social Research Society or AMSRS.

== Brief history ==
The Australian market research industry first began to gather momentum in the 1930s. The first Australian commercial service providers were founded in the late 1930s and early 1940s. Early industry pioneers were Sylvia Ashby who founded Ashby Research Services in 1936; Roy Morgan who became the Managing Director of Australian Public Opinion Polls in 1941; George Anderson who founded Analysis of Broadcasting in 1944 and Bill McNair who founded McNair Survey Pty Ltd in 1944. In the post-war economic boom conditions, demand for research services grew, and Australia became an attractive proposition for international market research companies that began establishing branches in Australia. For instance, AC Nielsen opened an Australian office in 1948.

The market research industry matured in the post-war years as research practitioners tapped into sophisticated scientific methods; statistics, probability sampling, and the emergence of predictive statistics in polling. Market researchers, themselves, contributed to methodological advances, devising experimental techniques for measuring radio and television audiences and began to explore new qualitative research techniques such as motivational research. In this climate, the market research industry began to position itself as a distinct discipline, separate from general marketing, and began to form dedicated professional associations.

The Market Research Society of Victoria was founded in August 1955 and it evolved into a national organisation in 1960. Following the formation of a New South Wales division in 1959, a Federal Council was established to coordinate the activities of the two states, and the Society's name was changed to the Market Research Society of Australia (MRSA) to reflect its broader geographic coverage. Branches were formed in other Australian states; including South Australia (1960), Western Australia (1969), and Queensland (1975). The first Code of Professional Behaviour was adopted in 1963 and Australia's first textbook dedicated to market research, Introduction to Market Analysis, was published by the Market Research Society of Australia (Victorian Division) in 1964. The society changed its name from the Market Research Society of Australia (MRSA) to the Australian Social and Market Research Society (AMSRS) in 2004.

== Membership ==
The Australian Market and Social Research Society (AMSRS) has 2,100 individual professional researchers as members. Its partner organisation, the Association of Market and Social Research Organisations (AMSRO) which represents market and social research organisations, has 90 member organisations, accounting for approximately 75 percent of the industry's employment. The market research industry turns over approximately $750 million annually and employs more than 10,000 equivalent full-time personnel (EFTs) in Australia, including 4,100 full-time professionals. In 2016, the AMSRS and AMSRO commenced negotiations to merge the two organisations, allowing the industry to speak with a 'single voice'.

== Code of professional behaviour ==
AMSRS members are bound to observe the AMSRS Code of Professional Behaviour, which provides an ethical framework for both conducting and reporting market and social research. In Australia, the market and social research industry operates under a co-regulatory system in which the peak industry body or bodies, such as ASMRS and AMSRO, develop codes of behaviour that are subsequently ratified by the government, after which time, they become binding on all industry members. The AMSRS code of professional behaviour is designed to ensure that strict standards of ethical and professional conduct are upheld. Both the AMSRO and AMSRS are empowered to investigate complaints relating to code breaches and can apply sanctions.

Members of AMSRS are bound by the following codes:

- The Code of Professional Behaviour.
- The Australian Standard for market, opinion, and social research (ISO 20252).
- The Quality Standard for Online Access Panels (QSOAP).
- The Qualified Practicing Market Researcher Scheme (QPMR).
- The Privacy (Market and Social Research) Code, 2014.

The Australian government, commenting on the Australian Privacy (Market and Social Research) Code, 2014, developed by the AMSRS, noted that it was far stricter than the government's privacy laws.

== Industry standards ==
The AMSRS has been instrumental in developing internationally recognised standards for conducting and reporting market and social research. For example, the Quality Standard for On-line Access Panels (QSOAP) was an initiative of both the Association of Market and Social Research Organisations (AMSRO) and the Australian Market and Social Research Society (AMSRS) and is now recognised as the world's best practice quality standard for online research.

The AS ISO standard 20252, was published worldwide in 2006 as the model for market, opinion, and social research in the market research industry. The standard was published in Australia in 2007 and AS ISO 20252 has been adopted by AMSRS as the Australian Standard for Market and Social Marketing Research.

The society works closely with the Market Research Quality Assurance Council and the Association of Market and Social Research Organisations (AMSRO).

== Other roles, activities, and services ==
The AMSRS:

- Publishes the journal, Market & Social Research, (formerly the Australasian Journal of Market and Social Research)
- Publishes books on topics of interest to practitioners (e.g. Statistics E-Book)
- Hosts an annual conference where members can share knowledge, research, innovative practices, and new research methodologies. In 2016, the AMSRS held its 44th annual conference
- In conjunction with AMSRO, the AMSRS administers the Qualified Practitioner of Market Research (QPMR) accreditation scheme
- Awards prizes and other incentives, such as the Young Researcher Award and the Research Effectiveness Award, are designed to encourage the insightful application of market or social research in solving practical business problems. The Australian Marketing Magazine described the Research Effectiveness Award for Social Impact as the "industry's pinnacle accolade".
- Organises formal and informal professional development activities for members (seminars, webinars, short courses, etc.)
- Sponsors Graduate Traineeship Programs (currently only in the state of Victoria, but with plans for a national roll-out)
- Partners with higher education institutions to develop industry-relevant subjects and courses

== Affiliations ==
AMSRS is represented on the Market and Social Research Committee of the International Organization for Standardization ISO responsible for setting global industry standards.

The Australian Market and Social Research Society is affiliated with international marketing research societies in England, New Zealand, Japan, The Philippines, and France. AMSRS is an active member of the International Marketing Federation and the European Society for Opinion and Marketing Research (ESOMAR).

== See also ==
- Advertising research
- Advertising Research Foundation
- Marketing research
