= Frederick V. McNair =

Rear admiral in the United States Navy

Frederick Vallette McNair
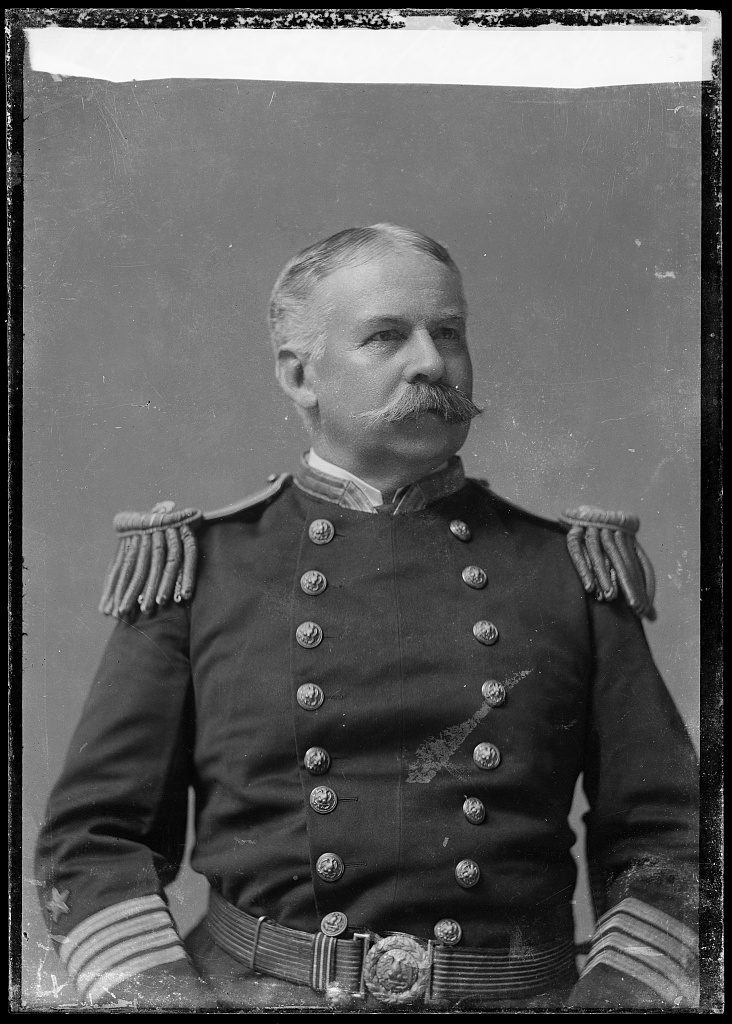
- Born: January 13, 1839; Abington, Pennsylvania, U.S.
- Died: November 28, 1900 (aged 61); Washington, D.C., U.S.
- Military career
- Allegiance: United States
- Branch: U.S. Navy
- Service years: 1853–1900
- Rank: Rear Admiral
- Conflicts: American Civil War

Frederick Vallette McNair (January 13, 1839 – November 28, 1900) was a rear admiral in the United States Navy. The destroyer USS McNair is named after him.

== Biography ==
McNail was born in Abington, Pennsylvania. He was appointed midshipman on December 21, 1853, graduating from the United States Naval Academy in 1857. He served on the Atlantic blockade stations and Mississippi River patrols during the American Civil War, rising to the rank of rear admiral in July 1898. He served as superintendent of the Naval Observatory from June 28, 1890, to November 21, 1894, and Superintendent of the United States Naval Academy from 1898 to 1900. Rear Admiral McNair died in Washington, D.C., on November 28, 1900, while awaiting orders.

He was the father of Frederick V. McNair Jr.; the great-grandfather of tennis star Frederick V. McNair, IV and poet/novelist Lailee McNair.

== See also ==
- USS McNair
