= Mount McNair =

Mountain in British Columbia, Canada

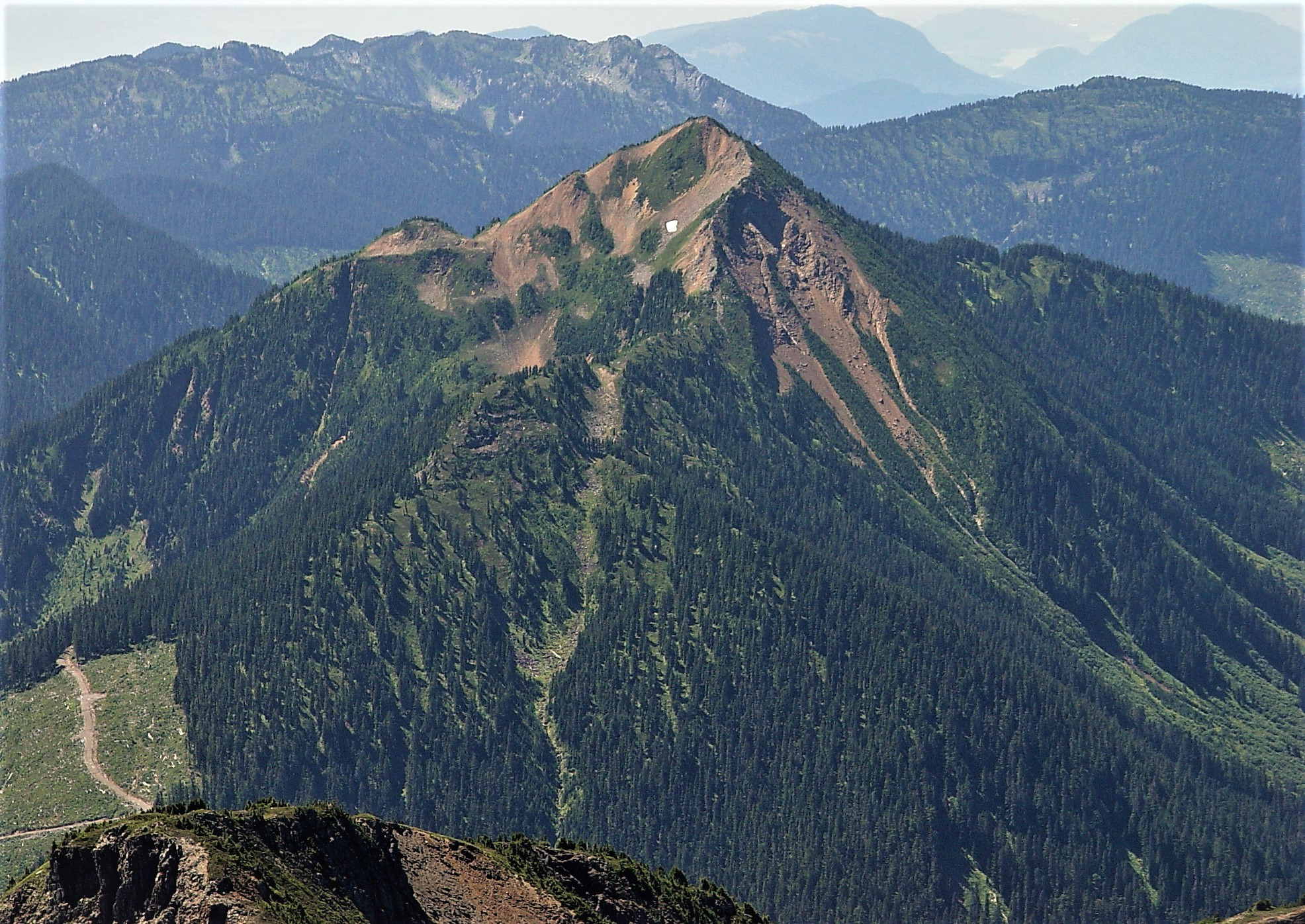
- Northeast aspect

Highest point
- Elevation: 1,784 m (5,853 ft)
- Prominence: 724 m (2,375 ft)
- Parent peak: The Old Settler (2,132 m)
- Isolation: 4.18 km (2.60 mi)
- Listing: Mountains of British Columbia
- Coordinates: 49°28′00″N 121°39′43″W

Naming
- Etymology: Nathaniel Wesley McNair

Geography
- Location within British Columbia Location within Canada
- Interactive map of Mount McNair
- Country: Canada
- Province: British Columbia
- District: Yale Division Yale Land District
- Parent range: Lillooet Ranges; Coast Mountains
- Topo map: NTS 92H5 Harrison Lake

Mount McNair is a 1,784-metre (5,853-foot) mountain summit located in British Columbia, Canada.

== Description ==
Mount McNair is part of the Lillooet Ranges of the Coast Mountains. The prominent mountain is situated 18 km (11 mi) northwest of Hope and 7 km (4 mi) east of Harrison Lake. Precipitation runoff from the peak drains to Harrison Lake via Talc and Bear creeks, and from Garnet Creek to the Fraser River. Mount McNair is more notable for its steep rise above local terrain than for its absolute elevation as topographic relief is significant with the summit rising 1,100 meters (3,609 ft) above Bear Creek in approximately 3 km (1.9 mi).

== Etymology ==
The mountain's toponym was officially adopted April 7, 1955, by the Geographical Names Board of Canada. The mountain is named after Royal Canadian Air Force Flight Sergeant Nathaniel Wesley McNair (1917–1943), from Chilliwack. He was serving with 460 (RAAF) Squadron when he was killed in action November 26, 1943, age 26. McNair perished during a raid against Berlin when his Avro Lancaster crashed during WWII in Europe.

== Climate ==
Based on the Köppen climate classification, Mount McNair is located in a subarctic climate zone of western North America. Most weather fronts originate in the Pacific Ocean, and travel east toward the Coast Mountains where they are forced upward by the range (Orographic lift), causing them to drop their moisture in the form of rain or snowfall. As a result, the Coast Mountains experience high precipitation, especially during the winter months in the form of snowfall. Winter temperatures can drop below −20 °C with wind chill factors below −30 °C.

== See also ==
- Geography of British Columbia
