= McNeir =

McNeir is a surname. Notable people with the surname include:

- Clive Leo McNeir, British linguist and lexicographer
- Forest McNeir (1875–1957), American sharpshooter and Olympian
- Ronnie McNeir (born 1949), American singer and songwriter
- William McNeir, member of Today (band)

== See also ==
- McNair
- McNeil (surname)
