= Frederick V. McNair Jr. =

U.S. Navy Medal of Honor recipient

Frederick Vallette McNair Jr.
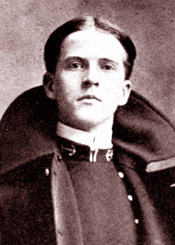
- McNair when he was an ensign
- Born: March 13, 1882; Maryland, U.S.
- Died: September 2, 1962 (aged 80); Annapolis, Maryland, U.S.
- Burial place: United States Naval Academy Cemetery
- Military career
- Allegiance: United States of America
- Branch: United States Navy
- Service years: 1903–1931, 1942
- Rank: Captain
- Commands: Destroyer Division 9, Atlantic Fleet; USS Dickerson; USS Woolsey; USS Winslow; USS Jenkins
- Conflicts: U.S. occupation of Veracruz, 1914; World War I World War II
- Awards: Medal of Honor; Navy Cross

Frederick Vallette McNair Jr. (March 13, 1882 – September 2, 1962) was an officer of the United States Navy and a recipient of the Medal of Honor for his actions at the beginning of the U.S. occupation of Veracruz, Mexico.

McNair was a graduate of the United States Naval Academy (Class of 1903), the son of Rear Admiral Frederick V. McNair (Class of 1857), the grandfather of tennis star Frederick V. McNair, IV and poet-novelist Lailee McNair.

== Biography ==
In July 1914, McNair assumed command of the destroyer Jenkins. In September 1915, he joined the staff at the Naval Academy. McNair was promoted to lieutenant commander on August 28, 1916.

During World War I, McNair served as commanding officer of the destroyer Winslow. He received a temporary promotion to commander effective January 1, 1918. McNair returned to the United States to prepare for the commissioning of the destroyer Woolsey before serving as her first commander. He was later awarded the Navy Cross for his wartime service.

After the war, McNair supervised the commissioning of the destroyer Dickerson and briefly served as her first commanding officer from September to October 1919. He was then given command of Destroyer Division 9, Atlantic Fleet. His promotion to commander was made permanent on September 21, 1920. McNair retired from active duty on June 30, 1931.

McNair was recalled to active duty during World War II and promoted to captain on February 23, 1942.

McNair lived in Annapolis, Maryland after retirement. He died at the United States Naval Academy Hospital in Annapolis on September 2, 1962. McNair is buried in the United States Naval Academy Cemetery and his grave can be located in lot 406.

== Medal of Honor citation ==
Lieutenant McNair was awarded the Medal of Honor on December 4, 1915.

=== Citation ===
For distinguished conduct in battle, engagement of Vera Cruz, April 22, 1914. Was eminent and conspicuous in command of his battalion. He exhibited courage and skill in leading his men through the action of the 22d and in the final occupation of the city.

== Navy Cross citation ==
Commander McNair was awarded the Navy Cross on September 23, 1919.

=== Citation ===
For distinguished service in the line of his profession as commanding officer of the U. S. S. Winslow and the U. S. S. Woolsey, engaged in the important, exacting and hazardous duty of patrolling the waters infested with enemy submarines and mines, in escorting and protecting vitally important convoys of troops and supplies through these waters, and in offensive and defensive action, vigorously and unremittingly prosecuted, against all forms of enemy naval activity.

== See also ==
- List of Medal of Honor recipients (Veracruz)
