= Matthew McNair Secondary School =

Matthew McNair Secondary
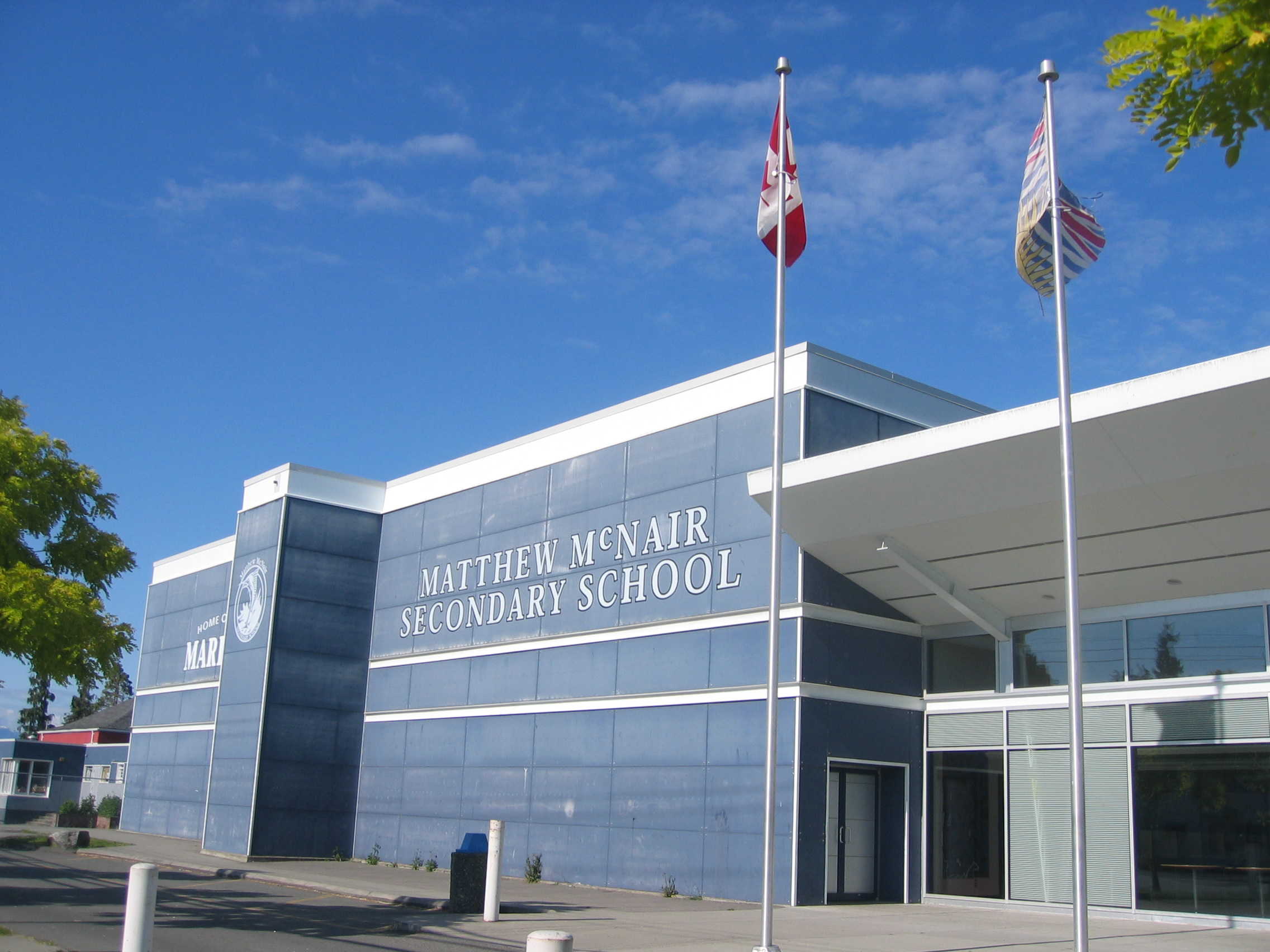

Location
- 9500 No. 4 Rd; Richmond, British Columbia, V7A 2Y9; Canada; 49.14238°N 123.11285°W

Information
- School type: High school
- Status: Open
- School board: School District 38 Richmond
- Superintendent: Scott Robinson
- Area trustee: Norm Goldstein
- School number: 3838044
- Principal: M. Jaswal
- Staff: ~80
- Grades: 8–12
- Gender: Mixed
- Age range: 13–18
- Enrollment: 724 (2020)
- Language: English
- Colours: Blue and Orange
- Mascot: Marli the Marlin
- Team name: Marlins
- Website: http://mcnair.sd38.bc.ca

Matthew McNair Secondary School is a public high school in Richmond, British Columbia and is part of School District 38 Richmond.

Matthew McNair is one of Richmond's semester-style schools. Its feeder schools include Hamilton Elementary, Walter Lee Elementary, Kingswood Elementary, Thomas Kidd Elementary, Woodward Elementary, and Morris Elementary.

== History ==
The school's namesake, Matthew McNair (1889–1971), was an early Richmond settler who arrived in 1911. After arriving, he established a milk delivery service before serving in World War I. After the war, McNair purchased farmland in south Richmond and served on the Richmond City Council as a councillor from 1946 to 1948.

McNair Secondary School opened in September 1971 as Richmond's third senior secondary. Initially, it served grades 11 and 12 only and provided a continuous education for students finishing grade 10 from McRoberts Junior Secondary. In 1996, Richmond's junior and senior secondaries were amalgamated, and every secondary school began serving students of grades 8 through 12. With this amalgamation, McNair's new drama room, kitchen, and gymnasium were completed in September of that year.

== Athletics ==
McNair offers soccer, basketball, volleyball, and rugby.

== Notable alumni ==
- Dan Russell (Hall of Fame British Columbian Sportscaster)
- Henry Yao
- Evan Dunfee
- Bindy Johal
- Mark Karpun
- Randy Samuel
- Ian Mendes (Ottawa Correspondent for Sportsnet)
