= Bakhtiar (name) =

Bakhtiyār (Persian: بختیار; lit. lucky), alternatively spelt as "Bakhtyar", "Baxtiyar", "Bachtiar", "Bakhtiyor", "Baxtiyor", "Bachtyar" and "Bahtiyar", is a Persian masculine given name and surname. Its feminine form is Bakhtawar. It is formed by a confluence of the elements ‘bakht’ meaning ‘fortune’ or ‘happiness’ and ‘avar’ meaning ‘bringing’ or ‘giving.’ Notable people with the name include:

== Given name ==
=== Bahtiyar ===
- Bahtiyar Aydın (1946–1993), Turkish general
- Bahtiyar Can Vanlı (born 1962), Turkish-German football coach

=== Bakhtiyar ===
- Muhammad Bakhtiyar Khalji (1150–1206), Ghurid general in Bengal under Qutb-ud-din Aibak
- Bakhtiyar Kaki (1173–1235), a 13th-century Sufi
- Bakhtiyar Artayev (born 1983), a Kazakh boxer
- Bakhtiyar Akhmedov (born 1987), a Russian wrestler
- Bakhtiyar Vahabzadeh (1925–2009), an Azerbaijani poet
- Bakhtiyar Musayev (born 1973), an Azerbaijani footballer
- Bakhtiyar Tuzmukhamedov (born 1955), Russian international lawyer
- Bakhtiyar Tyleganov (born 1976), a Kazakh boxer
- Bakhtiyar Zaynutdinov (born 1998), a Kazakh footballer
- Baxtiyor Rahimov (born 1963), an Uzbek Islamist militant
- Bakhtiyor Hamidullaev (born 1978), an Uzbek football player
- 'Izz al-Dawla Bakhtiyar (943–978), a 10th-century Buyid Amir
- Bäxtiär Qanqayıv, an 18th-century Russian colonel (of Tatar origin)
- Bakhtiar Amin (born 1959), Iraqi Kurdish politician

=== Bachtyar ===
- Bachtyar Ali (born 1960), Kurdish-Iraqi novelist and intellectual

== Surname ==
- Gulnazar, born Gülnezer Bextiyar (born 1992), Chinese actress and model of Uyghur origin
- Abol Ghassem Bakhtiar (1872–1971), Iranian physician
- Helen Jeffreys Bakhtiar (1905–1973), American nurse, civil servant
- Lailee Bakhtiar (born 1951), American author and critic
- Laleh Bakhtiar (1938–2020), Iranian-American author, translator and clinical psychologist
- Rudi Bakhtiar (born 1966), Iranian-American newswoman
- Shapour Bakhtiar (1914–1991), Iranian politician and Prime Minister of Iran
- Teymur Bakhtiar (1914–1970), Iranian general and head of Savak

== See also ==
- Akmal Bakhtiyarov, a Kazakh footballer
