= Fred McNair =

American tennis player

- Full name: Frederick V. McNair IV
- Country (sports): United States
- Residence: McLean, Virginia, U.S.
- Born: July 22, 1950 (age 76) Washington, D.C., U.S.
- Height: 1.83 m (6 ft 0 in)
- Turned pro: 1973
- Plays: Right-handed (one–handed backhand)

Singles
- Career record: 70–156
- Career titles: 4
- Highest ranking: No. 79 (October 11, 1976)

Grand Slam singles results
- Australian Open: 1R (1980)
- French Open: 2R (1974, 1976)
- Wimbledon: 3R (1977, 1978)
- US Open: 3R (1976)

Doubles
- Career record: 309–218
- Career titles: 16
- Highest ranking: No. 1 (1976)

Grand Slam doubles results
- Australian Open: 1R (1980)
- French Open: W (1976)
- Wimbledon: QF (1978)
- US Open: SF (1975)

Other doubles tournaments
- Tour Finals: W (1976)

Grand Slam mixed doubles results
- French Open: F (1981)
- Wimbledon: 3R (1978, 1981)
- US Open: QF (1977)
Medal record
Representing United States
Summer Universiade
| Bronze medal – third place | 1970 Turin | Doubles |

Frederick V. McNair IV (born July 22, 1950) is an American former professional tennis player who reached the world No. 1 doubles ranking in 1976. That year, he teamed up with Sherwood Stewart to capture the men's doubles titles at French Open, the German Open and the Masters. McNair was also a mixed doubles runner-up at the French Open in 1981, partnering Betty Stöve. In 1978, he was a member of the U.S. team that won the Davis Cup. In nine years on the professional tour, McNair won 16 doubles titles. His career-high singles ranking was world No. 67.

== History ==
Before turning professional, McNair played tennis for the University of North Carolina, where he was a four-time All-American and an NCAA doubles finalist in 1973.

McNair comes from a tennis playing family. His grandfather, Frederick V. McNair Jr., and father, Fred III, both played in the U.S. Championships (now known as the US Open). Fred III and Fred IV formed a father-son doubles team which won six U.S. national father and son doubles championship titles.

Since retiring from the tennis tour, McNair has become the president of McNair & Company Inc., a family practice founded by his grandfather in 1931 which uses life insurance in estate planning and executive benefits arena. He won the United States Tennis Association 35-over tennis title in 1989 and 40-over title in 1995.

== Family ==
McNair's father Frederick V. McNair III, grandfather Frederick V. McNair Jr., and great-grandfather Frederick V. McNair Sr., all graduated from the United States Naval Academy.

McNair is of Iranian descent on his maternal side, and his mother was Parveen Bakhtiar. His sister Lailee Bakhtiar, née McNair, is a writer. His maternal grandparents were Helen Jeffreys Bakhtiar and Abol Ghassem Bakhtiar. His uncle Jamshidi "Jim" Bakhtiar (1934–2022) worked as a psychiatrist, and he was a fullback/placekicker at the University of Virginia. Jim was selected by the Football Writers Association of America as a first-team back on its 1957 College Football All-America Team. He is related to of Laleh Bakhtiar, who was an author and psychologist. His maternal cousin is journalist Davar Ardalan.

== Career finals ==
=== Double: 38 (16 titles, 22 runner-ups) ===
| Result | W-L | Year | Tournament | Surface | Partner | Opponent | Score |
|---|---|---|---|---|---|---|---|
| Loss | 0–1 | 1973 | Merion, Pennsylvania, U.S. | Grass | (United States) Jeff Austin | (Australia) Colin Dibley (Australia) Allan Stone | 6–7, 3–6 |
| Win | 1–1 | 1973 | Aptos, California, U.S. | Hard | (United States) Jeff Austin | (South Africa) Raymond Moore (New Zealand) Onny Parun | 6–2, 6–1 |
| Win | 2–1 | 1973 | Christchurch, New Zealand | Hard | (India) Anand Amritraj | (United Kingdom) Andrew Jarrett (United Kingdom) Jonathan Smith | w/o |
| Win | 3–1 | 1974 | Jackson, Mississippi, U.S. | Carpet | (United States) Raz Reid | (South Africa) Byron Bertram (United Kingdom) John Feaver | 3–6, 6–3, 6–3 |
| Loss | 3–2 | 1974 | Merion, Pennsylvania, U.S. | Grass | (United States) Mike Machette | (United States) Roy Barth (Venezuela) Humphrey Hose | 6–7, 2–6 |
| Win | 4–2 | 1975 | Richmond, Virginia, U.S. | Carpet | (Austria) Hans Kary | (Italy) Paolo Bertolucci (Italy) Adriano Panatta | 7–6, 5–7, 7–6 |
| Win | 5–2 | 1975 | San Francisco, U.S. | Carpet | (United States) Sherwood Stewart | (Australia) Allan Stone (Australia) Kim Warwick | 6–2, 7–6 |
| Win | 6–2 | 1975 | Maui, Hawaii, U.S. | Hard | (United States) Sherwood Stewart | (United States) Jeff Borowiak (Pakistan) Haroon Rahim | 3–6, 7–6, 6–3 |
| Win | 7–2 | 1976 | Salisbury, Maryland, U.S. | Carpet | (United States) Sherwood Stewart | (United States) Steve Krulevitz (United States) Trey Waltke | 6–3, 6–2 |
| Win | 8–2 | 1976 | Bournemouth, United Kingdom | Clay | (Poland) Wojciech Fibak | (Spain) Juan Gisbert Sr. (Spain) Manuel Orantes | 4–6, 7–5, 7–5 |
| Win | 9–2 | 1976 | Hamburg, Germany | Clay | (United States) Sherwood Stewart | (Australia) Dick Crealy (Australia) Kim Warwick | 7–6, 7–6, 7–6 |
| Win | 10–2 | 1976 | French Open, Paris | Clay | (United States) Sherwood Stewart | (United States) Brian Gottfried (Mexico) Raúl Ramírez | 7–6, 6–3, 6–1 |
| Win | 11–2 | 1976 | Båstad, Sweden | Clay | (United States) Sherwood Stewart | (Poland) Wojciech Fibak (Spain) Juan Gisbert Sr. | 6–3, 6–4 |
| Loss | 11–3 | 1976 | Indianapolis, U.S. | Clay | (United States) Sherwood Stewart | (United States) Brian Gottfried (Mexico) Raúl Ramírez | 2–6, 2–6 |
| Loss | 11–4 | 1976 | Columbus, Ohio, U.S. | Hard | (United States) Sherwood Stewart | (United States) William Brown (United States) Brian Teacher | 3–6, 4–6 |
| Win | 12–4 | 1976 | South Orange, New Jersey, U.S. | Clay | (United States) Marty Riessen | (United States) Vitas Gerulaitis (Romania) Ilie Năstase | 7–5, 4–6, 6–2 |
| Loss | 12–5 | 1976 | Paris Indoor, France | Hard (i) | (United States) Sherwood Stewart | (Netherlands) Tom Okker (United States) Marty Riessen | 2–6, 2–6 |
| Win | 13–5 | 1977 | Memphis, Tennessee, U.S. | Carpet | (United States) Sherwood Stewart | (United States) Bob Lutz (United States) Stan Smith | 4–6, 7–6, 7–6 |
| Loss | 13–6 | 1977 | Rome, Italy | Clay | (United States) Sherwood Stewart | (United States) Brian Gottfried (Mexico) Raúl Ramírez | 7–6, 6–7, 5–7 |
| Loss | 13–7 | 1977 | Washington, D.C. | Clay | (United States) Sherwood Stewart | (Australia) John Alexander (Australia) Phil Dent | 5–7, 5–7 |
| Loss | 13–8 | 1977 | North Conway, New Hampshire, U.S. | Clay | (United States) Sherwood Stewart | (United States) Brian Gottfried (Mexico) Raúl Ramírez | 5–7, 3–6 |
| Loss | 13–9 | 1977 | Montreal, Canada | Hard | (United States) Sherwood Stewart | (South Africa) Bob Hewitt (Mexico) Raúl Ramírez | 4–6, 6–3, 2–6 |
| Loss | 13–10 | 1977 | San Francisco, U.S. | Carpet | (United States) Sherwood Stewart | (United States) Marty Riessen (United States) Dick Stockton | 4–6, 6–1, 4–6 |
| Loss | 13–11 | 1977 | Cologne, Germany | Carpet | (United States) Sherwood Stewart | (South Africa) Bob Hewitt (South Africa) Frew McMillan | 3–6, 5–7 |
| Win | 14–11 | 1977 | Oviedo, Spain | Hard | (United States) Sherwood Stewart | (Czechoslovakia) Jan Kodeš (Mexico) Raúl Ramírez | 6–3, 6–1 |
| Win | 15–11 | 1978 | Baltimore WCT, U.S. | Carpet | (South Africa) Frew McMillan | (United Kingdom) Roger Taylor (Italy) Antonio Zugarelli | 6–3, 7–5 |
| Loss | 15–12 | 1978 | Denver, Colorado, U.S. | Carpet | (United States) Sherwood Stewart | (South Africa) Bob Hewitt (South Africa) Frew McMillan | 3–6, 2–6 |
| Win | 16–12 | 1978 | Rotterdam WCT, Netherlands | Carpet | (Mexico) Raúl Ramírez | (United States) Robert Lutz (United States) Stan Smith | 6–2, 6–3 |
| Loss | 16–13 | 1978 | London Queen's Club, U.K. | Grass | (Mexico) Raúl Ramírez | (South Africa) Bob Hewitt (South Africa) Frew McMillan | 2–6, 5–7 |
| Loss | 16–14 | 1978 | Forest Hills WCT, U.S. | Clay | (United States) Sherwood Stewart | (Australia) John Alexander (Australia) Phil Dent | 6–7, 6–7 |
| Loss | 16–15 | 1978 | Washington, D.C. | Clay | (Mexico) Raúl Ramírez | (South Africa) Bob Hewitt (United States) Arthur Ashe | 3–6, 4–6 |
| Loss | 16–16 | 1978 | Los Angeles, U.S. | Carpet | (Mexico) Raúl Ramírez | (Australia) John Alexander (Australia) Phil Dent | 3–6, 6–7 |
| Loss | 16–17 | 1978 | Mexico City, Mexico | Clay | (Mexico) Raúl Ramírez | (India) Anand Amritraj (India) Vijay Amritraj | 4–6, 5–7 |
| Loss | 16–18 | 1979 | Cleveland, Ohio, U.S. | Hard | (Paraguay) Francisco González | (United States) Robert Lutz (United States) Stan Smith | 3–6, 4–6 |
| Loss | 16–19 | 1980 | Dayton, Ohio, U.S. | Carpet | (United States) Fritz Buehning | (Poland) Wojciech Fibak (Australia) Geoff Masters | 4–6, 4–6 |
| Loss | 16–20 | 1981 | Houston, Texas, U.S. | Clay | (India) Anand Amritraj | (Australia) Mark Edmondson (United States) Sherwood Stewart | 4–6, 3–6 |
| Loss | 16–21 | 1981 | Vienna, Austria | Hard (i) | (United States) Sammy Giammalva Jr. | (United States) Steve Denton (United States) Tim Wilkison | 6–4, 3–6, 4–6 |
| Loss | 16–22 | 1982 | Taipei, Taiwan | Carpet | (United States) Tim Wilkison | (United States) Larry Stefanki (United States) Robert Van't Hof | 3–6, 6–7 |
