= Nader Ardalan =

Iranian and American architect, urban planner, writer (born 1939)

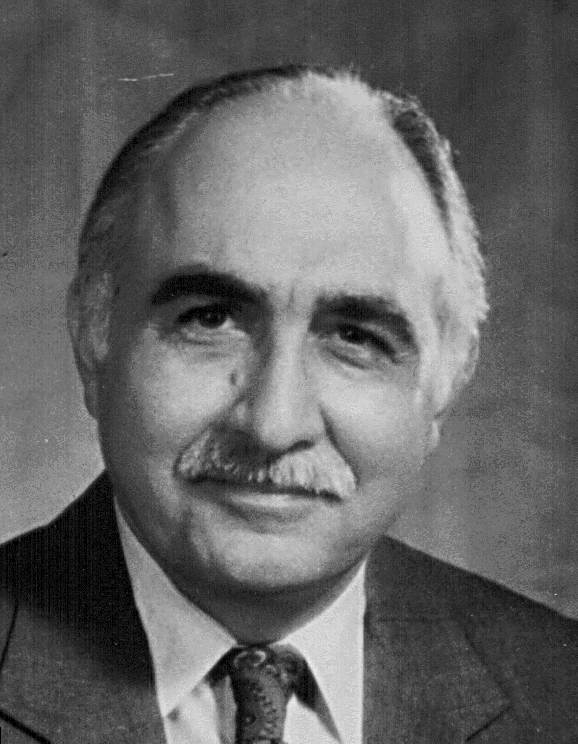
- Ardalan in 1986
- Born: March 9, 1939; Tehran, Imperial State of Iran
- Occupation: Architect
- Website: www.ardalanassociates.com

Nader Ardalan (born 9 March 1939) is an Iranian American architect, urban planner, educator, theorist, and author. Ardalan has had a significant impact on contemporary architecture in Iran, the Middle East, and North America as an architect, researcher, and theoretician. He is most identified with designing the Iran Centre for Management Studies in Tehran, the Azadi Stadium, and the Souq Sharq in Kuwait City, and with the co-authorship of the influential book The Sense of Unity. He holds legal citizenship in Iran and the United States.

== Early life and education ==
Ardalan was born in Tehran, Iran, to a middle-income family. His father was a member of the Ardalan clan of Iranian Kurdistan, and his mother was the daughter of noted jurist Ali Akbar Davar. In 1947, Ardalan moved with his family to the United States, after his father was appointed the Financial Attaché of the Iranian Embassy in Washington, D.C.. The family subsequently moved to New Rochelle, New York, when his father was appointed to the Iran Mission to the United Nations.

In 1956, Ardalan was awarded an AIA Five Year Scholarship to enroll in the undergraduate architectural degree program at the Carnegie Institute of Technology (now Carnegie Mellon University). He went on to obtain his master’s degree in architecture from the Harvard Graduate School of Design in Cambridge, Massachusetts, in 1962. Ardalan’s master’s program was directed by Catalan architect and former CIAM President, Jose Luis Sert, a close associate of Le Corbusier. After graduation, Ardalan accepted a position with the architectural firm of Skidmore, Owings & Merril in San Francisco. From 1962 to 1964, he worked directly with Chief of Design Edward Charles Bassett, a protégé of Eero Saarinen.

== Career ==
In 1964, Ardalan was invited by the National Iranian Oil Company (NIOC) to return to Iran as the head of the architecture and engineering section. NIOC had commenced a recruitment process to bring back to Iran professionally-trained Iranians from Western countries to take over certain duties formally in the hands of the Anglo-Iranian Oil Company. The two-year NIOC contract included all paid family travel back to Iran, including the shipment of his household goods and car to the NIOC Fields Headquarters in Masjed Soleyman.

In 1965, Ardalan collaborated with Kamran Diba to design the Tehran Museum of Contemporary Art, which was built and inaugurated by the Queen of Iran in 1977.

In 1966, Ardalan joined Abdul Aziz Farmanfarmaian in Tehran, where he designed the Saman Center, the first twin-tower, 25-story prefabricated concrete residential apartments of Iran. From 1968 to 1977, he served as the Design Partner of AFFA during which time he designed the Azadi Olympic Sports Center; the Iran Centre of Management Studies (now Imam Sadegh University); and the Behshahr Headquarters (now the Ministry of Education). From 1972 to 1979, he founded and served as managing director of the Mandala Collaborative with Yahya Fiuzi, Houshang Jahid and Ali Ramazani. During this time he worked with Ian McHarg on the masterplan for Pardisan Park and Mahshahr New Town, with Georges Candilis on the Bu Ali Sina University in Hamadan, and for the Atomic Energy Organization of Iran on the master plan for a sustainable city of 100,000 people to be built outside Isfahan.

Ardalan co-authored with Laleh Bakhtiar the book The Sense of Unity: The Sufi Tradition in Architecture, published by the University of Chicago Press in 1973. The book went on to influence several architects and scholars interested in contemporary Islamic architecture.

In 1977, Ardalan relocated his practice and to Boston after being invited by both Harvard and Yale to be a visiting critic in architecture. After the Iranian Revolution, from 1983 to 1994, Ardalan was Principal-in-charge of International Design and Operations at Jung/Brannen Associates. During this period, his international work included proposals for the preservation plan of the Old City of Jerusalem, and winning designs for the Citizen's Bank Headquarters in Providence, Rhode Island, and the ADMA-OPCO Headquarters in Abu Dhabi. This project, completed in association with Arup, and notable for having been entirely based upon advanced sustainable design principles, led to his being invited to relocate to the Persian Gulf from 1994 to 2006 and become Senior Vice President and Director of Design for KEO International Consultants.

=== Practice ===
Ardalan Associates, LLC. Consulting Architects is headquartered and registered in Naples, Florida. Ardalan formed a research program within his office to pursue the advanced investigation of design and planning topics. The research has contributed to programs undertaken in concert with the Architecture, Culture, Spirituality Forum (ACSF). Since 2013, Ardalan has directed the ACSF research team studying the subject of transcendent architecture, which resulted in the ACSF Declaration of Transcendent Human Habitat, endorsed by the board of directors in 2019. Ardalan has undertaken other nonprofit research projects in Iran and the Persian Gulf.

=== Academia ===
From 1968 to 1971, Ardalan was a visiting instructor of architecture at the Department of Fine Arts, University of Tehran, where he worked gratis and directed a student research project on documenting Indigenous Iranian architecture and planning. Selected portions of the resulting research documents were incorporated into the 1973 book The Sense of Unity: The Sufi Tradition in Persian Architecture, published by University of Chicago Press.

In 1977, he was invited to hold joint positions as a visiting design critic at the Yale School of Architecture and the Harvard Graduate School of Design, followed in 1978 by a position as visiting critic of architecture at the MIT School of Architecture and Planning.

From 2006, Ardalan served as research fellow of the Center for Middle Eastern Studies, Harvard University, where he was project director of the Gulf Research Project and, in 2009, co-authored with Steve Caton the New Arab Urbanism research publication for the Kennedy School of Government. In February 2011, he joined the Harvard Graduate School of Design as a senior research associate to direct, over a three-year period, a 1,000-page research book on the eight countries of the Gulf, published in 2018 as Gulf Sustainable Urbanism, and sponsored by the Qatar Foundation. The Kennedy School later sponsored his research for the Kuwait National Green Campus Initiative, with John Spengler. Since his move in 2015 to Naples, Florida, he has served as the senior advisor on the proposed Harvard GSD Project on South Florida and Sea Level.

Ardalan has been a visiting professor at Harvard, MIT, Yale, Tehran University, and lectures widely.

== Personal life ==
In 1960, Ardalan was engaged to Laleh Bakhtiar, and they married in 1964 in California. Ardalan and Bakhtiar have three children, including Iran Davar. The couple divorced in 1976 in Tehran. In 1977, Ardalan married Shahla Ganji, and they have one child.

== Works ==
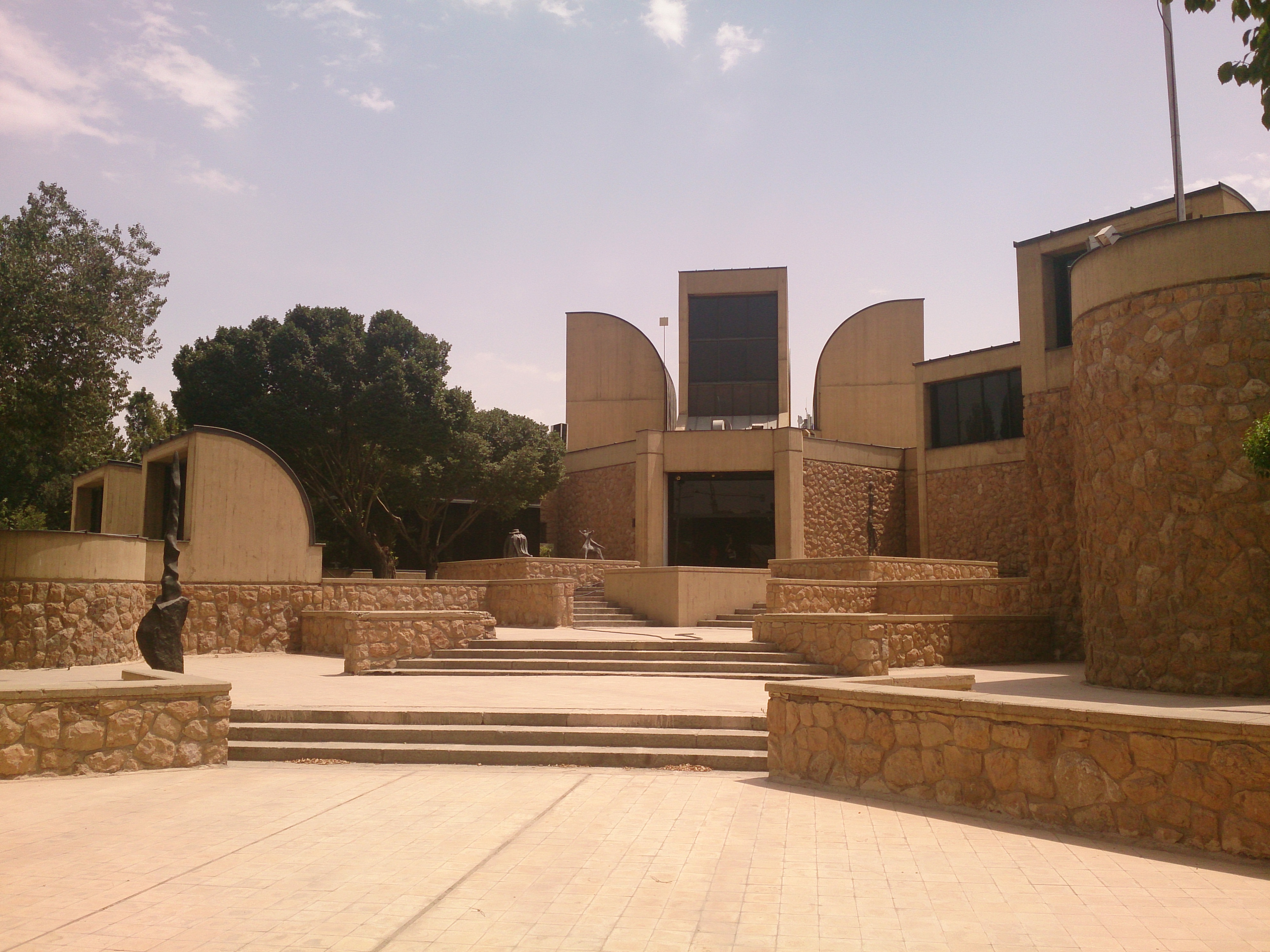
Tehran Museum of Contemporary Art

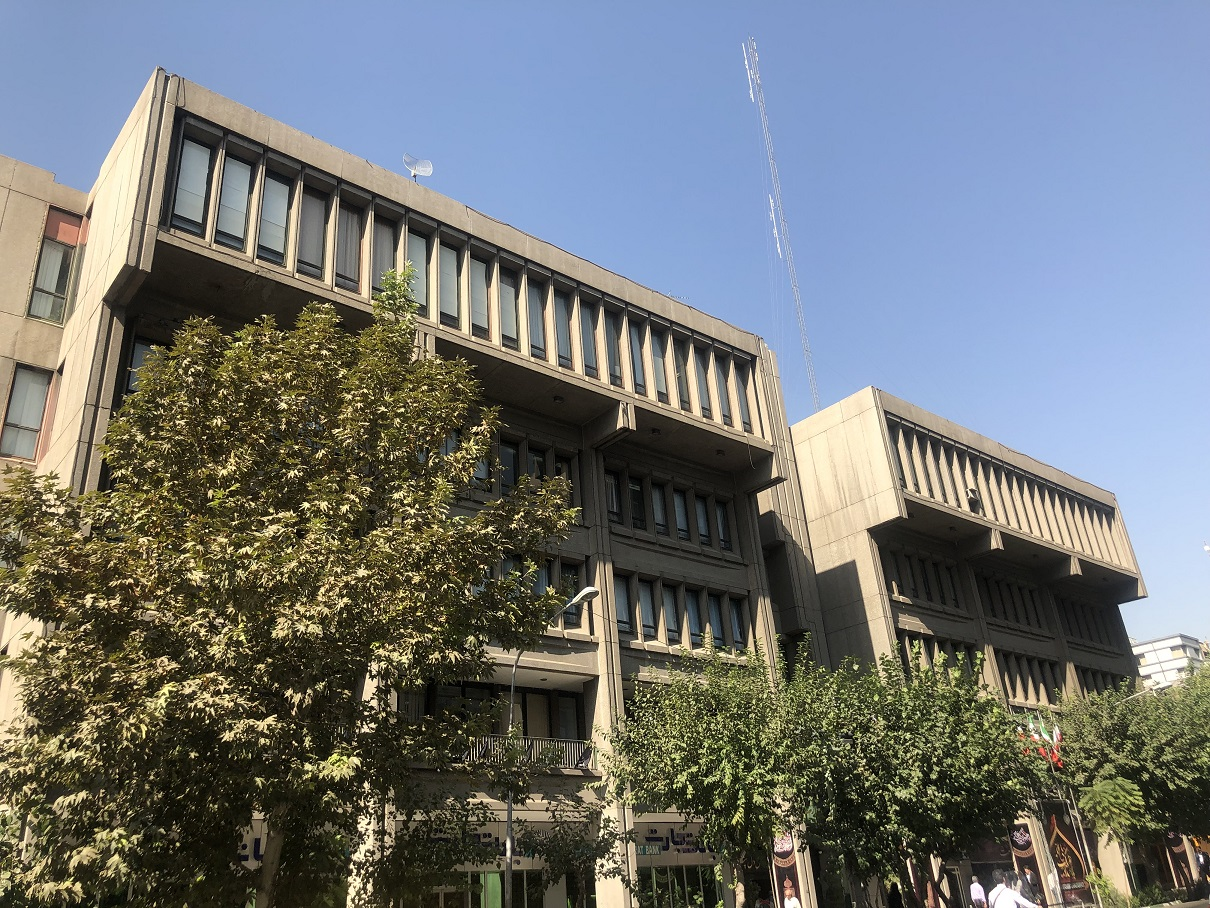
Ministry of Education of Iran

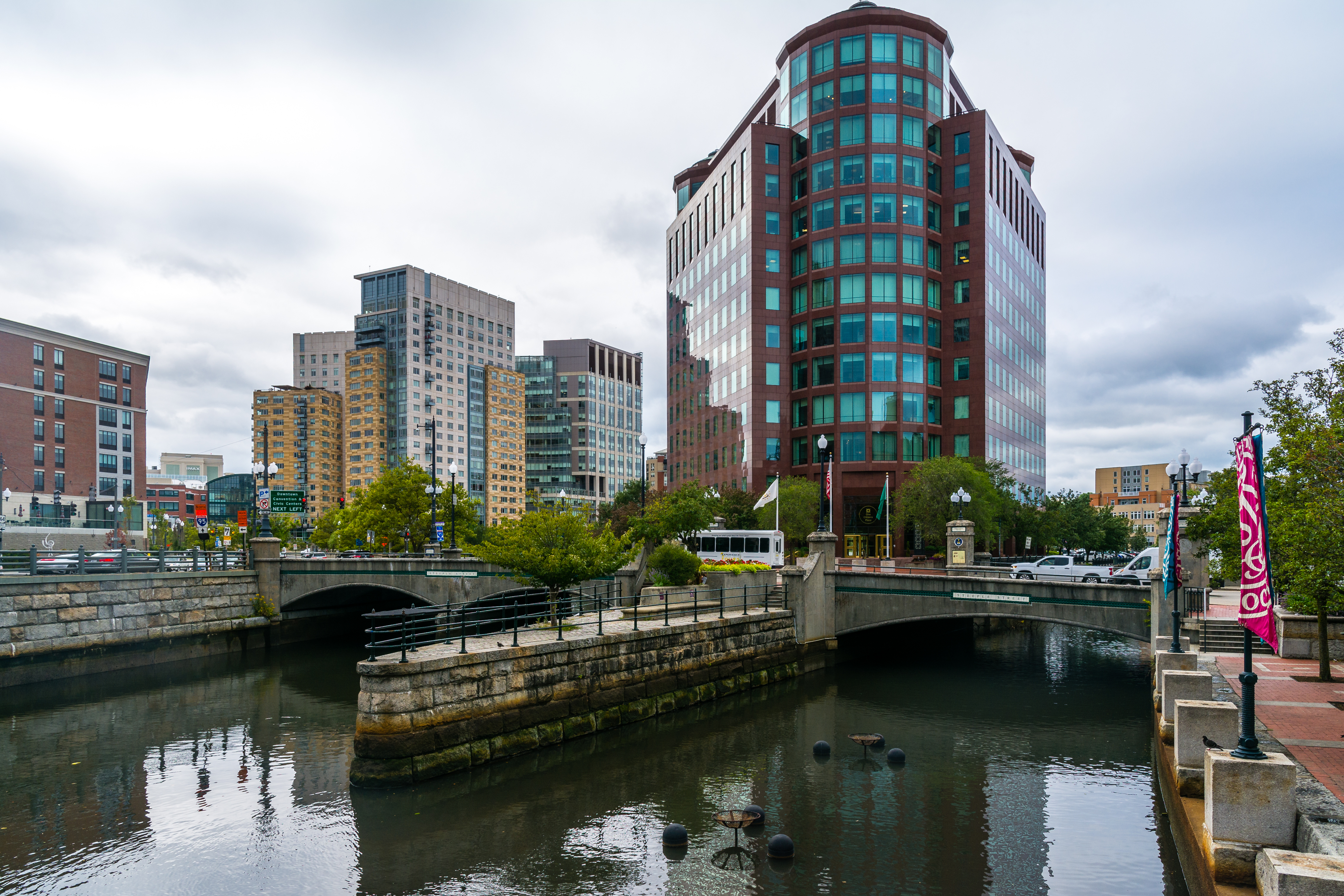
One Citizens Plaza

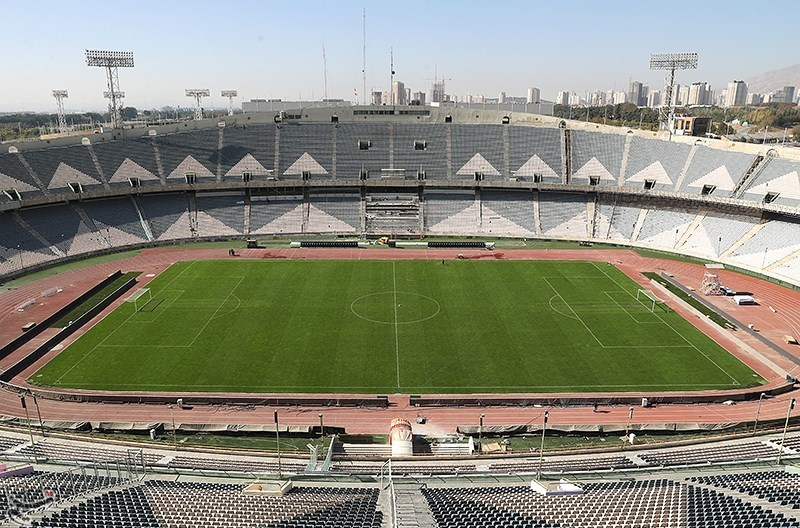
Interior of Azadi Stadium

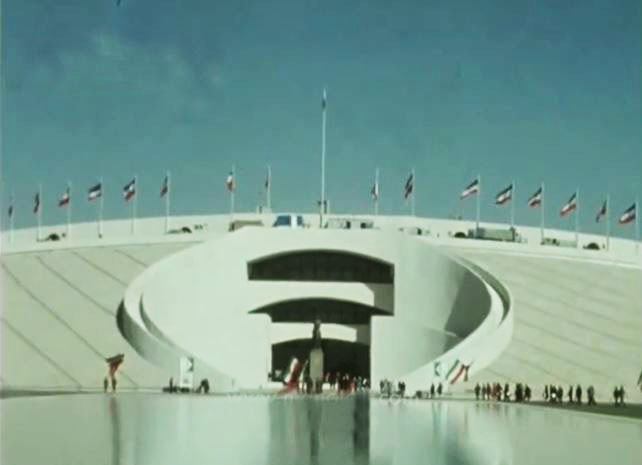
Gateway of Azadi Stadium

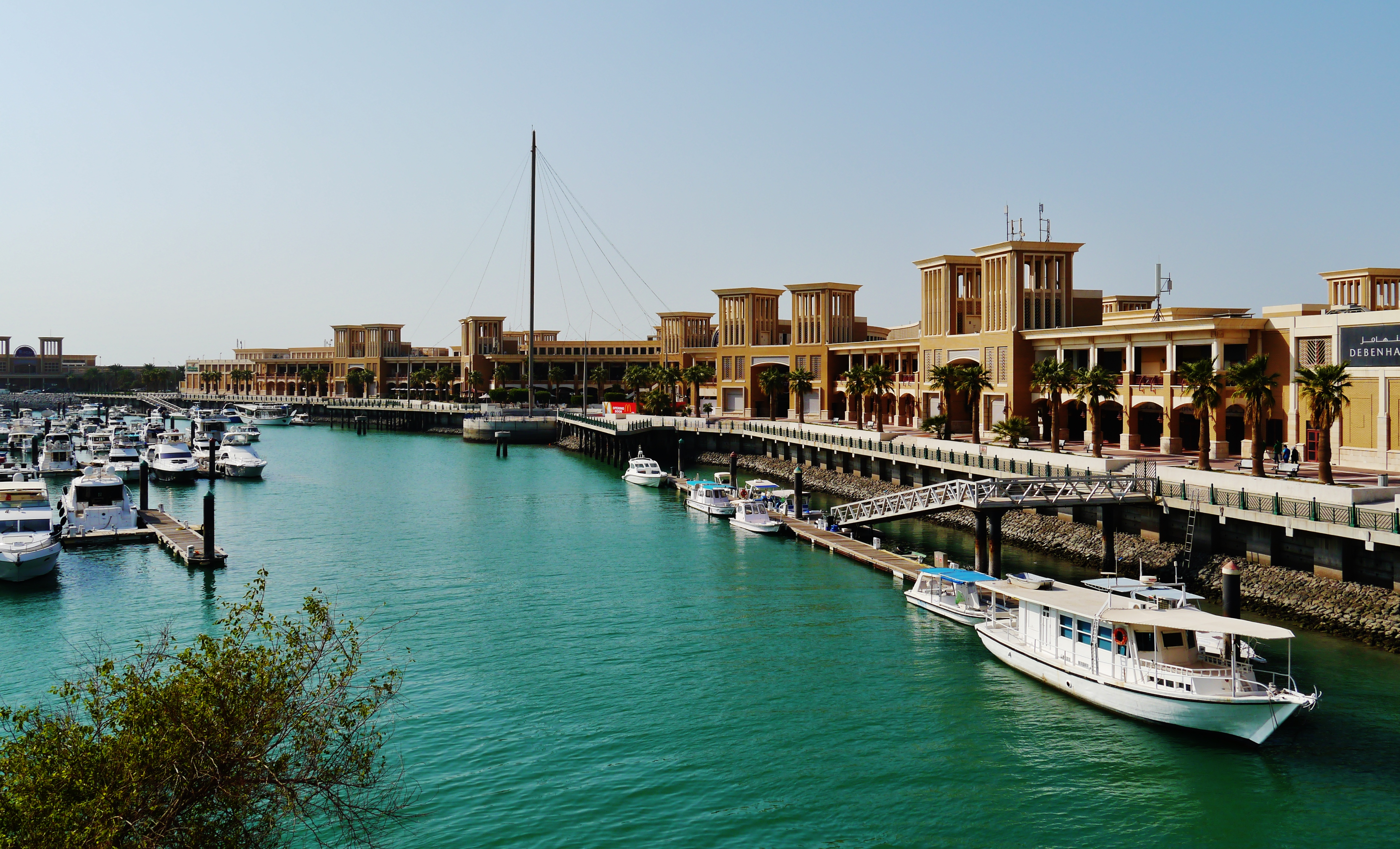
Souq Sharq

=== Exhibitions ===
- MANtransFORMS, National Museum of Design, Smithsonian Institution, New York, US, 1976
- Venice Biennale, Architecture of Nader Ardalan, 1981 by invitation of Paolo Portoghesi
- The Universel Project: Design Presentation Boards & Model, Suresnes, Paris, France

=== Master planning projects ===
- Azadi Olympic Sports Center Masterplan & 100,000 Seat Earthen Stadium with AFFA, Tehran, Iran, 1968-1972.
- Pardisan Environmental Park, a 300-hectare educational park to demonstrate successful ecological adaptations by plants, animals, and humans to changing earth systems and help anticipate ecologically adaptive and culturally relevant action for the future with Mandala Collaborative and Ian McHarg for the Department of Environment - Tehran, Iran, 1973 to 1977.
- Nuran, City of Illumination – Solar City Master Plan for 100,000 population with Mandala Collaborative, August Komendant, Peter Walker, Dubin-Bloome for the Iran Atomic Energy Organization, Isfahan, Iran, 1974 to 1977
- Besat New Town Master Plan for 200,000 population with Mandala Collaborative, WMRT, and SOM for National Iranian Petrochemical Company (NIPC), Mahshahr, Iran, 1972 to 1977.
- New Town Master Plan for 70,000 population with Mandala Collaborative & SOM, Bandar Shahpour area, Ahwaz, Iran, 1975
- Tappeh Eram, New Residential Community for 60,000 population with Mandala Collaborative, Shiraz, Iran, 1976
- Boston Harbor Cleanup Master Plan Project with Jung/Brannen Associates, Boston, USA, 1989-1990
- Abu Dhabi Sustainable Net-Zero Energy Community Master Plan 7,500 population with Ardalan Associates and Kling Stubbins, and Arup for Aldar Properties, UAE, 2008.

=== Cultural & educational projects ===
- Tehran Museum of Contemporary Art with Nader Ardalan & Kamran Diba, Tehran, Iran
- Mausoleum for Shams I Tabrizi with Ardalan Associates and Design Core 4, Khoy, Iran
- Iran Center for Management Studies (with Harvard Business School) with AFFA & Mandala Collaborative, Tehran, Iran
- The Iran Room, with Ardalan Associates, University of Pittsburgh, Pa.
- Information Technology College with KEO for UAE University, Al Ai, UAE (First Place Design)
- Bu Ali Sina University with Mandala Collaborative & Georges Candilis, Hamadan, Iran
- Creative Arts Center with Mandala Collaborative for Queen’s Special Bureau, Tehran, Iran
- Pardisan Ecological Park with Mandala Collaborative & Ian McHarg for the Department of Environment, Tehran, Iran
- Tehran Center for the Celebration of Music with Mandala Collaborative for the Ministry of Culture of Iran, Tehran, Iran

=== Hospitality projects ===
- Four Seasons Hotel - Kuwait
- Four Points Sheraton Hotel - Kuwait
- Shangri La Resort Palm Jumeirah - Dubai, UAE (First Place Design Competition)
- Sheraton Residential Hotel - Kuwait
- Desert Resort Hotel - Al Ain, UAE for Emirates Land Group
- Royal Meridien Hotel Redevelopment - Abu Dhabi, UAE
- Intercontinental Hotel Ballroom - Dubai, UAE
- Vanak Tower, Hotel & Shopping Mall Development - Tehran, Iran
- 1,000 Room 5-Star Hotel, Mall, Office & Residential Development - Tehran, Iran
- Starbucks Café - Kuwait
- Moscow Hotel Historic Renovation - Kiev, Ukraine
- Hilton Hotel, Mersin - Turkey
- Sheraton Hotel, Ankara - Turkey
- Serena Hotel and Retail Center Study, The Aga Khan - Faisalabad, Pakistan

=== Residential development projects ===
- The Alfred Luxury Apartment Tower - Lincoln Center, New York
- Houston Courthouse Development - Houston, Texas
- Saman Center Apartment Towers - Tehran, Iran
- DAMAC Residential Towers - Tripoli, Libya
- Faisaliah Residential Tower - Kuwait
- CDC Residential Development - Kuwait
- Zeina Residential Tower - Kuwait
- Yasmine Residential Tower – Kuwait
- Bu-Khamseen Residential Apartments - Kuwait
- Areej Apartments - Kuwait

=== Private residential projects ===
- Sea Palace for the wife of the President of UAE, H.H. Sheikha Fatima - Abu Dhabi
- McKinnon Villa - Kuwait
- Al Qubaisi Residence - Abu Dhabi, UAE
- Al Junaibi Residence - Abu Dhabi, UAE
- Dr. Abdul Aziz & Donna Sultan Villa - Kuwait
- Faisal Sultan Residence - Kuwait
- Malek Residence - Tehran, Iran
- H.E. Dr. A.G. Ardalan Villa - Caspian Sea, Iran
- Dr. Ali Saidi Residence - Tehran, Iran

=== Commercial office development projects ===
- Citizens Bank Headquarters - Providence, RI (First Place Design Competition)
- Adma-Opco Oil Company Headquarters - Abu Dhabi (First Place Design Competition)
- The Intelligent Tower, a 70-story sustainable office building in Doha, Qatar, for the GOIC
- (First Prize International Design Competition)
- DAMAC Office Tower - Riyadh, Saudi Arabia
- Al Awadi Office Tower and Shopping Mall - Kuwait (First Place Design Competition)
- The Diwan of H.H. the Ruler's Representative in the Eastern region - Al-Ain, UAE
- National Bank of Kuwait - New Image and Prototypical Branch Banks - Kuwait
- Al Bahar Headquarters Tower - Kuwait

=== Interior design projects ===
- Price Waterhouse Office Interiors Historic Renovation - Boston, MA
- Thomas H. Lee Office Interiors - Boston, MA
- The Beal Companies Office Interiors - Boston, MA
- H.N. Gorin Company Offices Interiors - Boston, MA
- President's Plaza, Batman Corp., Lobby Interiors - Washington, D.C.
- Renovation of Ardalan Residence - Chestnut Hill, MA
- Kuwait Sheraton Hotel - New Ballroom & Iranian Restaurant, Kuwait
- Renovation of Ardalan Residence - Naples, Florida
- Renovation of Royal Poinciana Golf Club - Naples, Florida
- Renovation of Wyndemere Country Club, Naples, Florida

=== Writing ===
- The Sense of Unity: The Sufi Tradition in Persian Architecture with Laleh Bakhtiar, University of Chicago Press, 1973.
- Masjid al-Haram and the Holy Ka’ba: Research based upon records made available in Mecca and others in the British Museum that documented a history of the Holy Ka’ba from its ancient beginnings to the present time. Completed for the Ministry of Finance and National Economy of the Kingdom of Saudi Arabia. In English and Arabic, 1975.
- Pardisan Environmental Park, The Mandala Collaborative/WMRT, Winchell Press, 1975.
- Habitat Bill of Rights: Residential & Community Design Guidelines for the United Nations Habitat Conference, with Jose Lluis Sert, Moshe Safdie, George Candilis and BK Doshi, 1976.
- Blessed Jerusalem: Preservation studies of the visual, functional and spiritual character of the Old City, Harvard University, Graduate School of Design, 1981.
- Historic Renovation of the American Mission Hospital, Dar al Athar, Kuwait, 2000.
- El Sentido De La Unidad, La Tradición Sufi En La Arquitectura Persa, Ardalan, Nader, Bakhtiar, Laleh, Ediciones Siruela, 2007
- Re-conceiving the Built Environment of the Gulf Region: Sustainable design research, guidelines and design applications, Art & Architecture Magazine, Fall, 2007- Guest Editor.
- New Arab Urbanism: The Challenge to Sustainability and Culture in the Persian Gulf by Nader Ardalan & Steven Caton, Harvard Kennedy School, 2010.
- Persian Gulf Sustainable Urbanism: Harvard University & Msheireb Properties, A subsidiary of Qatar Foundation, published 2018, Nader Ardalan, Co-Senior Editor.

== See also ==
- Kamran Diba
