= Davar Ardalan =

American and Iranian journalist, writer, strategist (born 1964)

- داور اردلان
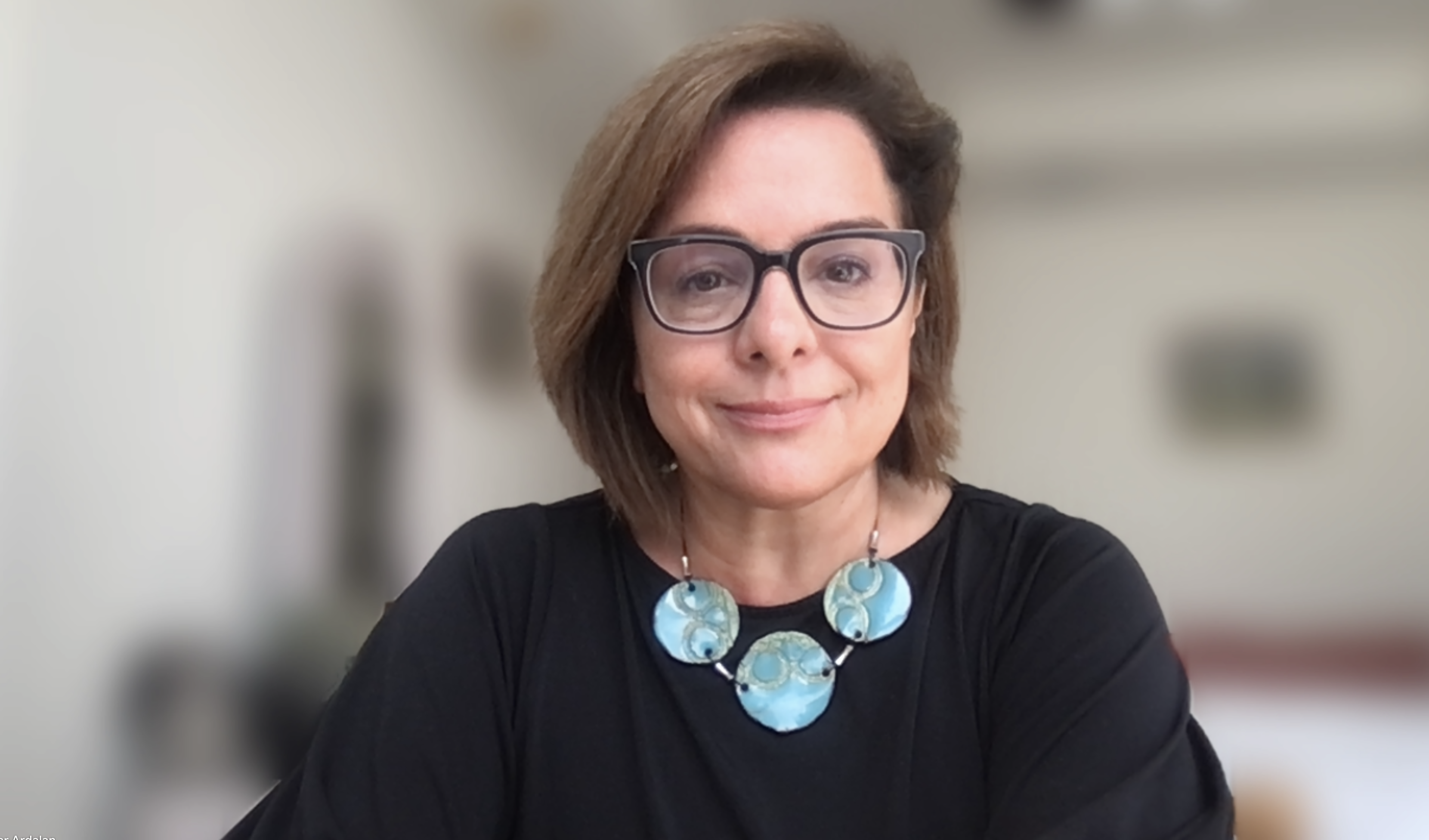
- Davar Ardalan, 2023
- Born: Iran Davar Ardalan; April 1, 1964 (age 62); San Francisco, California, U.S.
- Education: University of New Mexico (BA)
- Occupations: Entrepreneur, journalist, author
- Years active: 1991–present
- Known for: My Name is Iran (book), Tell Me More, Weekend Edition
- Spouse: John Oliver Smith
- Children: 8
- Parents: Nader Ardalan (father); Laleh Bakhtiar (mother)
- Family: Ali-Akbar Davar (great-grandfather); Abol Ghassem Bakhtiar (grandfather); Helen Jeffreys Bakhtiar (grandmother); Jim Bakhtiar (uncle)

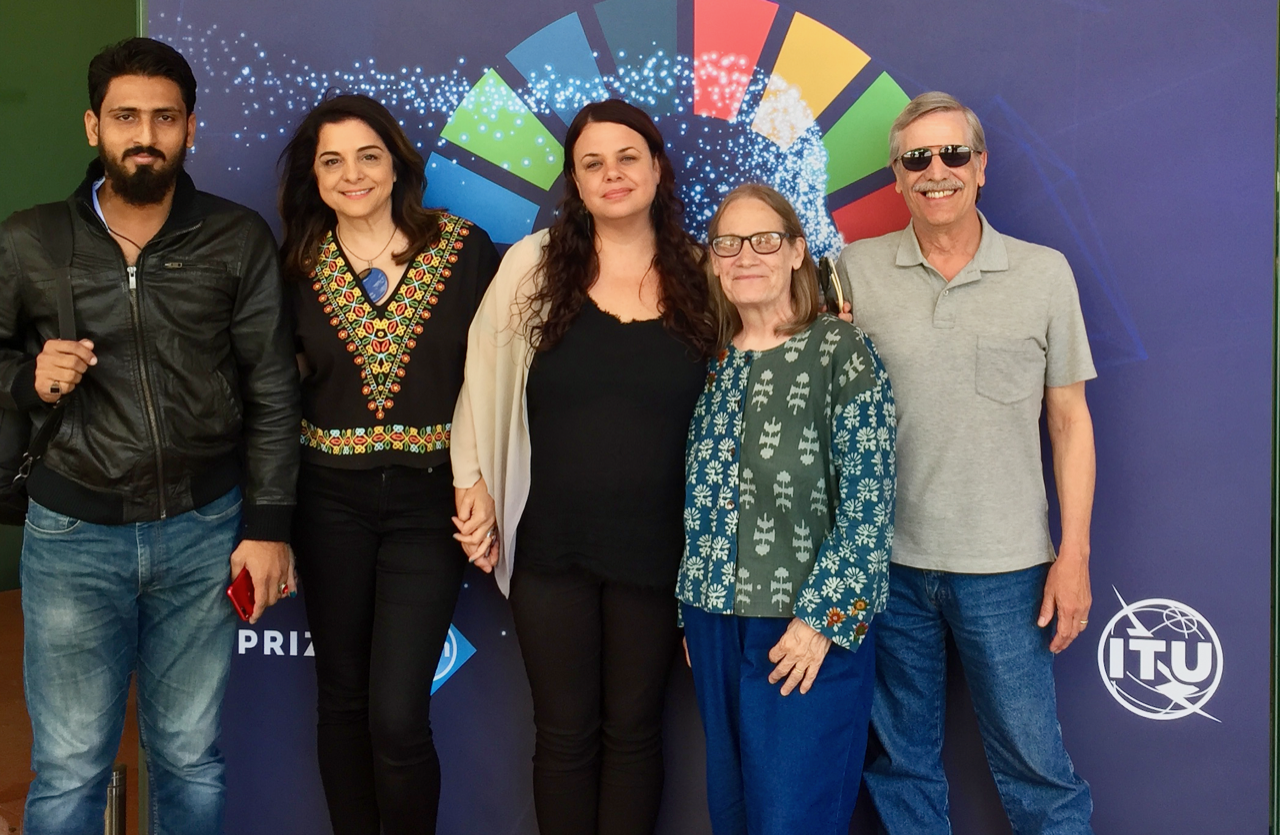
Davar Ardalan pictured with IVOW team in Geneva, Switzerland

Iran Davar Ardalan (born April 1, 1964) is an American and Iranian artificial intelligence strategist, journalist, writer, and storyteller. Her career has spanned Booz Allen, National Geographic, NPR, and the White House Presidential Innovation Fellowship program. She has led significant research on large language models and risk mitigation, and led AI integration and digital transformation initiatives across sectors. In September 2025, she was named one of Project Voice's Voice AI 100, recognizing one hundred individuals who made significant contributions to conversational AI in the previous decade.

Known professionally as Davar Ardalan, she is the former Executive Producer of Audio at National Geographic, and has served as co-chair of the Cultural Heritage and AI track at ITU's AI for Good. Prior to this, she was deputy director of the White House Presidential Innovation Fellowship Program in Washington, D.C. She was also a long-time journalist at NPR News, where she helped shape the news shows Weekend Edition and Morning Edition.

From 2018 to 2022, Ardalan was the founder and chief storytelling officer at IVOW (Intelligent Voices of Wisdom), which championed culturally conscious data strategies across multiple industries, from academia to development and enterprise. In April 2021, Project Voice awarded IVOW the Google Developer of the Year for Sina, the Storyteller.

Ardalan previously served as Managing Editor at Hanson Robotics. Ardalan is also active as a visual artist, working in acrylic and collage with themes related to artificial intelligence.

She is the author of two books, My Name is Iran and The Persian Square. A third book co-authored by Ardalan, AI for Community, explores the role of AI in human flourishing and was published by Taylor & Francis in 2025. That same year, Ardalan spoke at The AI Summit in London.

== Career ==
Ardalan's career in American media began in 1991 at KOAT-TV in Albuquerque, New Mexico. A year later, she made the switch to radio as a reporter at KUNM-FM in Albuquerque. She produced cultural and news stories on health and environmental concerns in Los Alamos for which she won first place in documentaries from the Associated Press in New Mexico.

=== National Geographic ===
Ardalan joined National Geographic in August 2020. As National Geographic's executive producer of audio, she oversees the podcast series Overheard, as well as the limited series Into the Depths, which followed a group of Black divers dedicated to finding and documenting some of the thousand slave ships that wrecked in the Atlantic Ocean during the transatlantic slave trade. Together with National Geographic Society, Ardalan's audio team has also piloted Soundbank, a database featuring crowdsourced sounds of nature from explorers and photographers around the world.

=== White House Presidential Innovation Fellowship ===
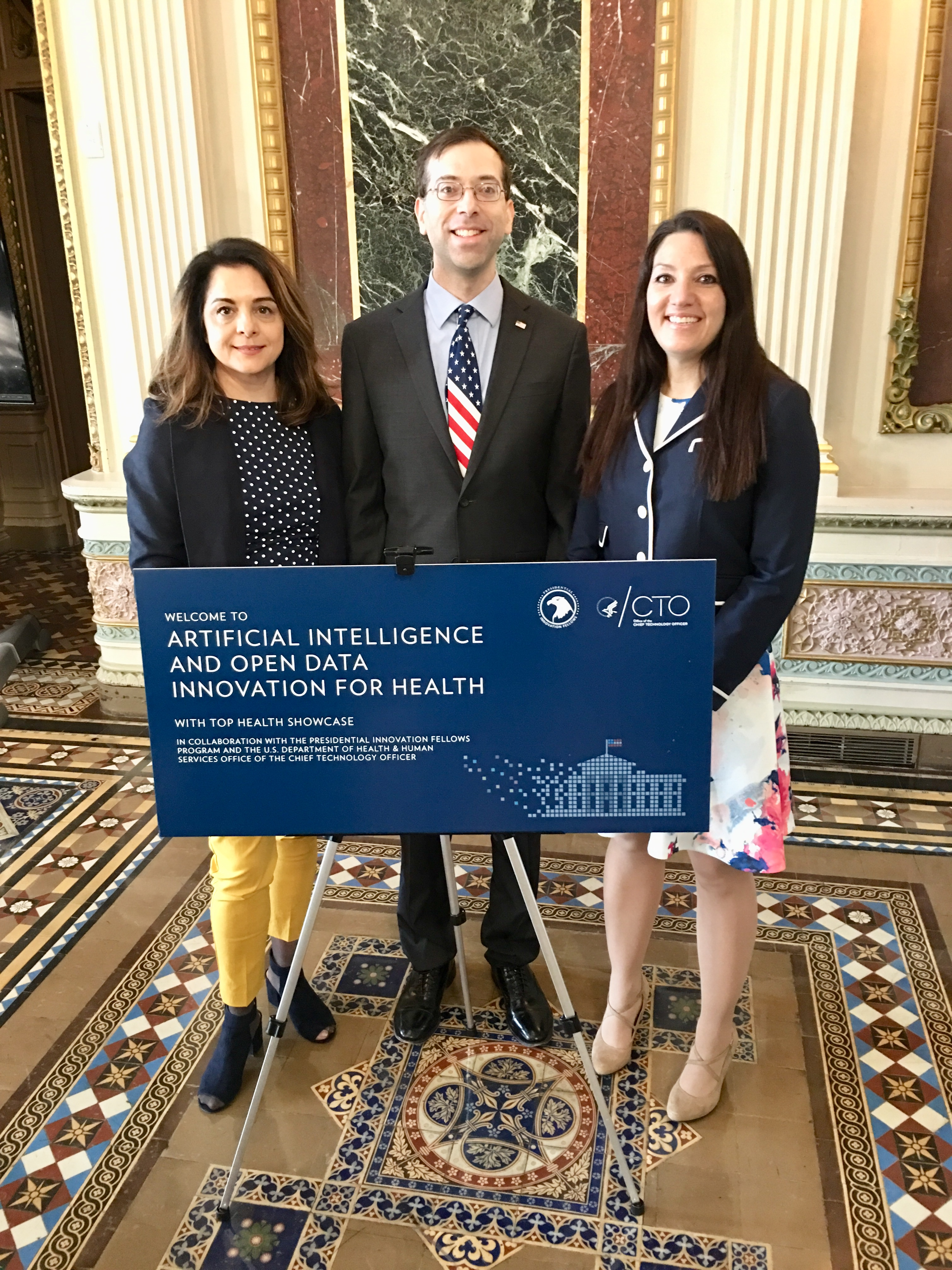
Ardalan (left) as deputy director and Director of Storytelling at the White House Presidential Innovation Fellowship in October 2018.

Davar Ardalan joined the White House Presidential Innovation Fellows program (PIF) as deputy director and Director of Storytelling in October 2018, working with Executive Director Joshua DiFrances. The fellowship pairs entrepreneurs, designers and innovators from the private sector to team up with forward-thinking agency partners to modernize critical government services, including transportation, healthcare, veterans affairs, and American technology, as well as hosting engagement workshops on data and digital storytelling.

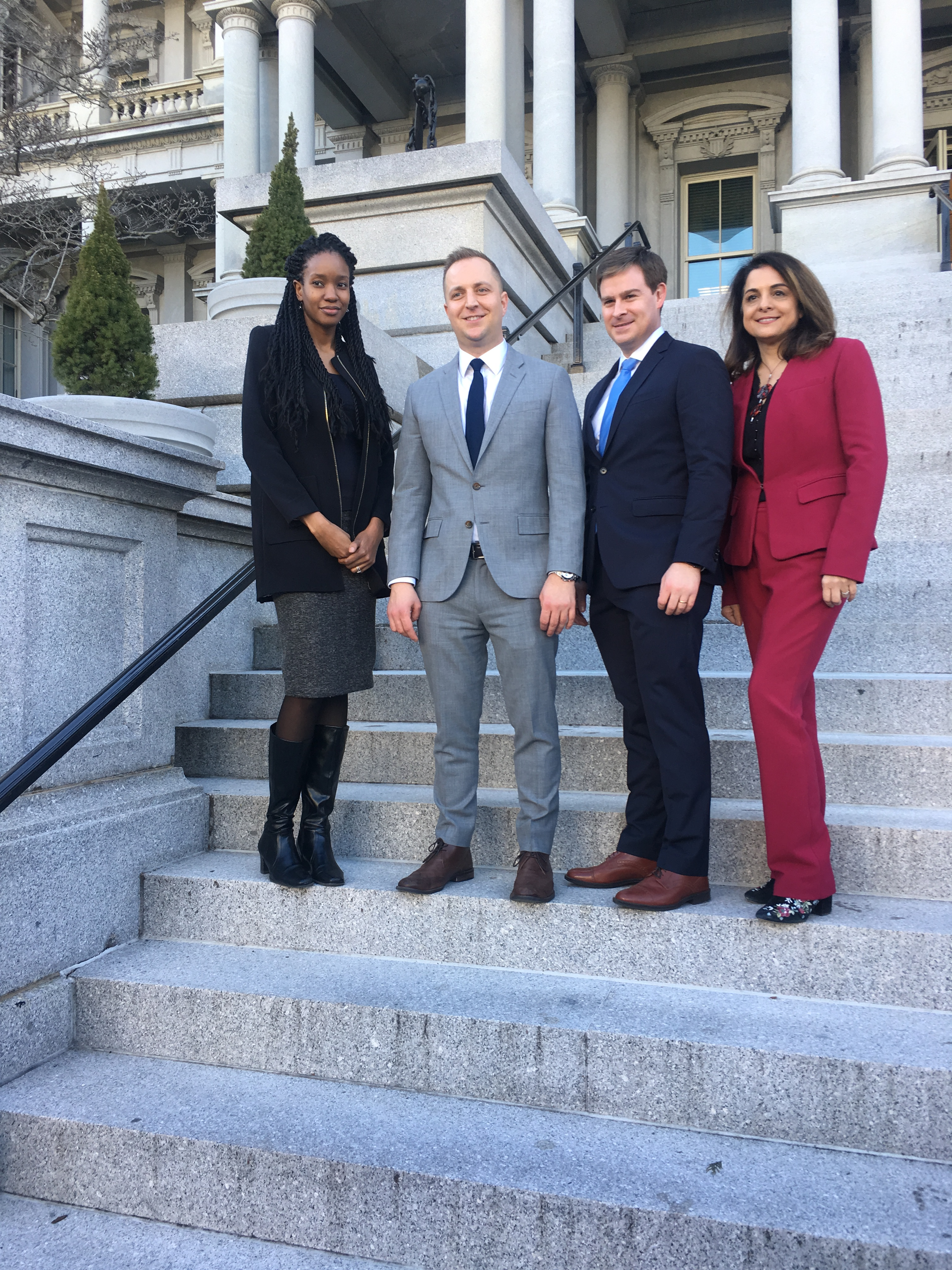
Ardalan (right) at the White House Presidential Fellowship Leadership in October 2018.

=== NPR ===
Ardalan joined NPR in 1993. She began as a temporary production assistant in July 1993 and moved to a full-time production assistant position at Weekend Edition Sunday a year later.

She held many titles at NPR News, including Senior Producer of NPR's Identify and Culture Unit, Senior Supervising Producer of Weekend Edition, Senior Supervising Producer of Morning Edition. Throughout her career, she has produced a wide array of radio stories, especially those pertaining to the culture, art, history, women's rights, and politics in Iran, as well as issues surrounding the wars in Iraq and Afghanistan.

Ardalan left NPR in 2010, but subsequently came back to the organization. Ardalan was the senior producer of NPR's Tell Me More and in 2015, her last position at NPR was Senior Producer of the Identity and Culture Unit. She was responsible for decisions that required elaborate coordination such as live broadcasts from Baghdad, Kabul, and New Orleans. Ardalan is an advocate for cross-platform storytelling, and at NPR, her real-time storytelling campaigns cultivated thought leaders across platforms and reached millions on Twitter and Facebook.

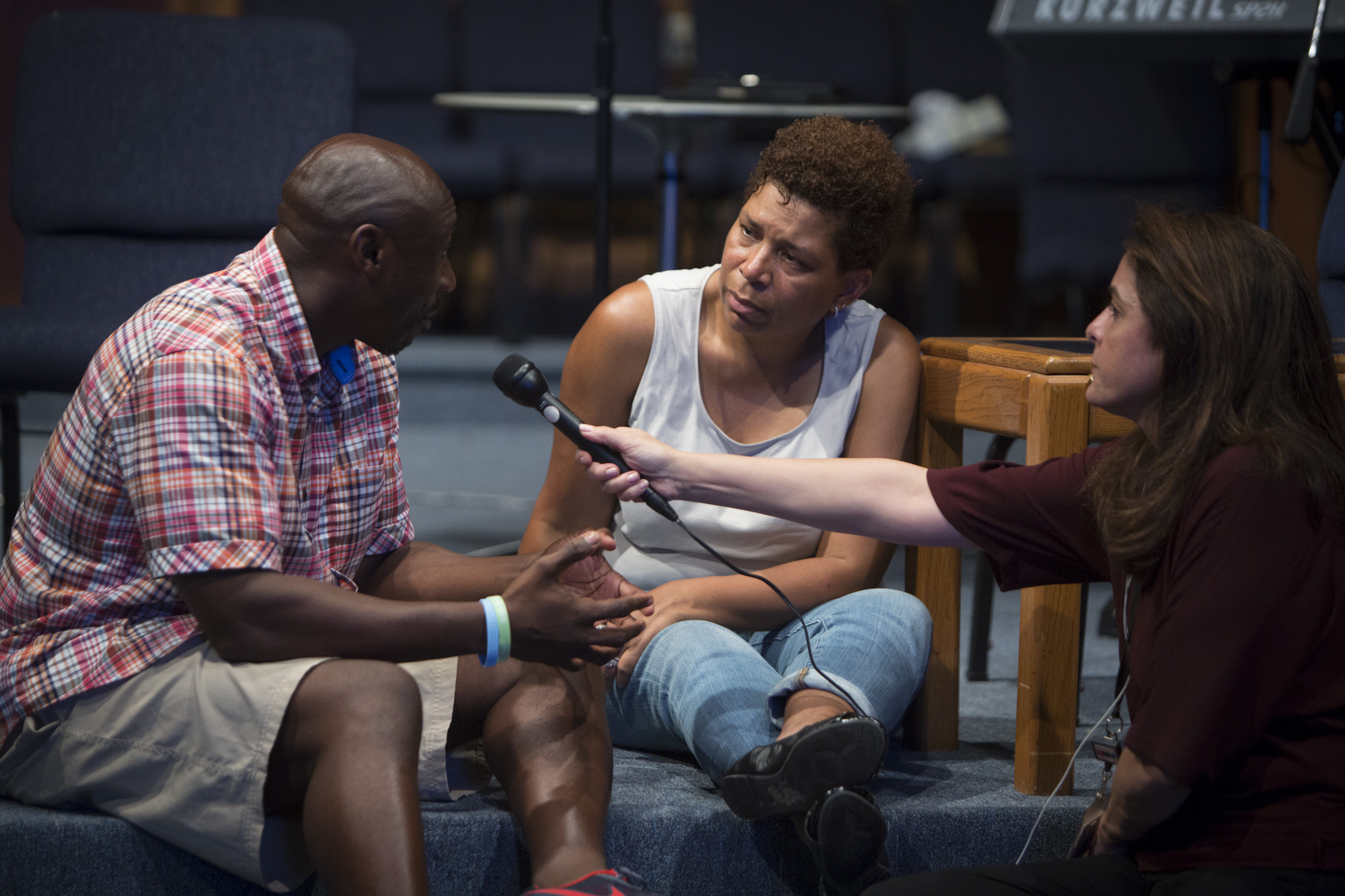
Davar Ardalan on NPR Assignment with Michel Martin

=== The Persian Square ===
Ardalan is the author of The Persian Square, an intimate but historically grounded telling of how American and Iranian traditions have embraced one another. This digital book, available on iTunes and Kindle, offers a vivid portrait of Iranian Americans — exploring the early intersections between the two countries' citizens and the unexpected places where American and Iranian tradition have embraced one another. It includes historical documents, handwritten letters, archival photos, and over 30 media files including music, videos and several audio recordings from 1912, 1915, and 1924 used with permission from Sony Music. The book also contains links to certain NPR stories from between 1995 and 2012 with permission from NPR.

=== My Name is Iran ===
In 2004, Ardalan's full name, Iran Davar Ardalan, inspired the three-part NPR/American Radioworks series, My Name is Iran, which traced her Iranian heritage, as well as her own experiences after the 1979 Islamic revolution. In 1984, she was an English news anchor at IRIB News broadcasting throughout the Persian Gulf Region. In her book, she writes about the struggle of a nation as reflected in her family's story led to her memoir My Name Is Iran published by Henry Holt in 2008.

=== AI for Community ===
AI for Community: Preserving Culture and Tradition presents artificial intelligence as a bridge between ancestral knowledge and future innovation. First introduced at the AI for Good Summit in Geneva, it positions cultural intelligence as a central consideration in the development and governance of AI. The text advances the concept of “Cultural AI” and describes applications for documenting, stewarding, and transmitting cultural knowledge.

By formalizing the idea of Cultural AI, the book has contributed to discussions about the role of artificial intelligence in cultural preservation, community empowerment, and long-term strategic innovation. AI practitioner Jigyasa Grover described it as “a cultural framework for computational empathy,” referencing examples including Indigenous Knowledge Graphs and language revitalization pipelines. Reviewers noted its accessibility for younger readers and non-technical audiences, and emphasized the practical case studies and its usefulness for communities evaluating the opportunities and risks of adopting AI.

== Early life and education ==
She was born in San Francisco, California. Ardalan attended elementary and middle school at Iranzamin International School in Tehran, and graduated from Brookline High School in Brookline, Massachusetts. Ardalan earned a B.A. degree in communications and journalism from the University of New Mexico.

She was a television newscaster for Islamic Republic of Iran Broadcasting (IRIB) English News in Iran.

== Family ==
Her father is Nader Ardalan, an architect, urban planner, and writer. Ardalan's parents married in 1960 and divorced in 1976.

Her mother was Laleh Bakhtiar (born Mary Nell Bakhtiar), an Iranian and American scholar, lauded for Islamic spirituality and Quranic critical thinking. Bakhtiar authored, translated, edited, and adapted over 150 books including The Sense of Unity with her then-husband Nader Ardalan, and Sufi Expressions of the Mystic Quest. One of her proudest accomplishments came in 2007 with her translation of the Quran called The Sublime Quran. Ardalan serves as a board member and Director of Data for Bakhtiar's Institute of Traditional Psychoethics and Guidance, and she is building a conversational AI based on her mother's work.

Her maternal grandmother, Helen Jeffreys Bakhtiar, a public health worker in Iran during the 1950s, was honored by the nomadic Bakhtiari tribe, who named a mountain after her. Her maternal grandfather, Abol Ghassem Bakhtiar was a noted physician in Iran.

Her maternal uncle Jamshid, better known as Jim Bakhtiar (1934–2022), was a fullback and placekicker at the University of Virginia and he was selected by the Football Writers Association of America as a first-team back on its 1957 College Football All-America Team; he later became a psychiatrist.

She is a great-granddaughter of Ali-Akbar Davar.

Ardalan married to John Oliver Smith, an environmental engineer and entrepreneur. Ardalan and Smith have raised eight children together, and live in the Washington, D.C., metro area.

== Awards and recognition ==
In April 2002, Ardalan and Jacki Lyden received a Gracie award from the American Women in Radio and Television for the NPR documentary Loss and Its Aftermath, the story of Israeli and Palestinian parents speaking about the deaths of their children in the conflict.

On May 10, 2014, Ardalan was awarded an Ellis Island Medal of Honor at a ceremony in New York City. This honor is awarded to "American citizens who have distinguished themselves within their own ethnic groups while exemplifying the values of the American way of life."

In March 2022, Ardalan's team at National Geographic's Overheard were honored at the Ambies for Best Knowledge, Science and Tech Podcast. The team also won three Anthem Awards in February 2022: Gold for the episode In Conversation: Reframing Black History and Culture, and two silver medals, for Searching for the Himalaya’s Ghost Cats and Olympic Training During a Pandemic. In May 2022, Overheard received a Webby, in the category of Diversity and Inclusion in Podcast, for its episode A Reckoning in Tulsa.

In 2025, Ardalan was a finalist in two categories of the Booz Allen Gen AI Academy Awards for her innovative work in generative AI and storytelling. She has been recognized with 2023 and 2024 Signal Awards for her work with National Geographic, and recognized with a NASA Team Leadership award for Space Apps, two NABJ Awards, a Gracie Award from the American Women in Radio and Television and a mention in the comic strip Zippy.
