= Committee Against Torture =

UN body of human rights experts

The Committee Against Torture (CAT)
United Nations Committee Against Torture
- States parties States that have signed, but not ratified States that have not signed
- Type: Committee established by treaty
- Signed: 26 June 1987
- Location: Geneva
- Effective: 26 June 1987
- Depositary: UN High Commission for Human Rights (UNHCHR); UN Secretary-General
- Languages: Arabic, Chinese, English, French, Russian and Spanish

Full text
- Committee against Torture at Wikisource

The Committee Against Torture (CAT) is a treaty body of human rights experts that monitors implementation of the United Nations Convention against Torture by state parties. The committee is one of eight UN-linked human rights treaty bodies. All state parties are obliged under the convention to submit regular reports to the CAT on how rights are being implemented. Upon ratifying the convention, states must submit a report within one year, after which they are obliged to report every four years. The committee examines each report and addresses its concerns and recommendations to the state party in the form of "concluding observations." Under certain circumstances, the CAT may consider complaints or communications from individuals claiming that their rights under the convention have been violated.

The CAT usually meets in April/May and November each year in Geneva. Members are elected to four-year terms by state parties and can be re-elected if nominated.

== Tasks and activities ==
=== Ratifications ===
In their ratification of the agreement, the states had to expressly agree to the state and individual complaints procedure, the examination procedure and the intern. The court had to expressly refuse them if they did not agree, such as, for example, Poland.

German-speaking countries	Germany	Liechtenstein	Austria	Switzerland
Convention against Torture	01.10.1990	02.11.1990	29.07.1987	02.12.1986
investigation process (Art. 20 FoK)	no reservation	no reservation	no reservation	no reservation
State cases (21 FoK)	yes	yes	yes	yes
individual applications (Art. 22 FoK)	yes	yes	yes	yes
Intern. Court of Justice (Art. 30 FoK)	no reservation	no reservation	no reservation	no reservation

None of these states has created the independent investigation and complaints office, which means that there is no effective remedy for torture.

== Rules of Procedure of the CAT ==
In order to carry out its duties as defined in Part II FoC, the committee established a Rules of Procedure (VerfO) governing the organization, procedures and responsibilities of the committee (Article 18 (2) FoK). It is also based on the Addis Ababa directive on the independence and impartiality of UN treaty bodies.

It consists of 2 parts, Part I. General Provisions and Part II. Provisions relating to the tasks of the committee. It is further subdivided into 19 chapters and contains 121 rules (version /C/3/Rev.6). These are numbered and in a revision of the VerfO the rules get new numbers.

In the revision on February 21, 2011, in Chap. 17 and 21 introduced a follow-up procedure to review the implementation of the committee's recommendations, stating that states ignored its recommendations.

The relevant chapters of the VerfO are:

- Cape. 17. Reports of the Contracting States pursuant to Art. 19 FoK
- Cape. 19. Investigation procedure under Art. 20 FoK
- Cape. 20. Treatment of state complaints under Art. 21 FoK
- Cape. 21. Examination of individual complaints under Art. 22 FoK

== Examination of the state reports ==
The predominant activity is to examine the statements of account of the contracting states, in which they must state how they implemented the contract(Art. 19 FoK). The course of the examination is described in chap. 17 of the VerfO regulated. The states must submit an initial report to the committee within one year of the conclusion of the contract, followed by a periodic report about every four years thereafter. If a state does not submit a report, the committee notes this in its annual report to the United Nations General Assembly (Resolution 67 RMA).

Due to the overloading of the committees, the Simplified Reporting Procedure was introduced by the UN General Assembly. If no material shortcomings have been identified at the time of the last review of a country report, the committee can now proceed with the simplified procedure, in which it issues to the contracting parties a list of issues before reporting (LOIPR). Replies to LOIs) are then considered as periodic state reports (Rule 66 RMA).

Non-governmental organizations (NGOs) and national human rights organizations (NHRIs) can also actively participate in the state reporting process and submit parallel reports to the state reports in order to show that the implementation of the civil pact by the contracting states is insufficient. In the process, gaps or errors in the state report can be clarified and deficits pointed out.

The report review takes place in public meetings in which the committee examines whether the state party correctly implemented the Torture Convention and how it could remedy existing shortcomings (Rule 70 RMA). For the participation of third parties in the public hearing, an admission is required (English Accreditation).

If a state fails to file a report despite being warned, the committee examines the implementation of the FoK based on the parallel reports submitted by the NGOs and NHRIs and notes this in its annual report to the UN General Assembly (Rule 67 RMA).

If the committee determines during the audit that the state has failed to implement the agreement, it may submit proposals to remedy the deficiencies (Article 19 (3) FoK, Rule 71 of the VerfO). These proposals are called Concluding Observations.

These proposals of the CCPR are not legally binding, implementation can not be enforced and only a follow-up procedure is foreseen, in which a rapporteur examines the implementation by the state (Rule 72 RMA). If necessary, the same proposals will be made at the next state report.

Since some states are late in submitting their reports, the United Nations High Commissioner for Human Rights (UNHCHR) has drawn up a list of states submitting their reports on time (e.g. Italy, Switzerland, etc.) and a list of those who are in Arrears (e.g. Germany, Liechtenstein, Austria, the Vatican etc.).

== Investigation process ==
The Anti-torture Convention also includes an inquiry procedure which empowers the committee to conduct investigations when reliable information is available on serious or systematic NPT violations by a state party and seeks the cooperation of the state party concerned (Article 20) FoK). This examination procedure is regulated in Chapter 19 of the VerfO. The condition for this is that the state explicitly rejected this when ratifying the treaty (Article 28 (1) FoK).

The state is asked by the committee to participate in the investigation proceedings and to provide information on these suspicions (Article 20 (1) FoK, Rule 82 et seq. First of all, the information received is examined (Rule 81 et seq. Of the VerfO) and, if the suspicion has been substantiated, an investigation is carried out, in which case the committee can also conduct investigations in the affected state if the state agrees. Upon completion of the investigation, the committee will send the investigation report to the state concerned and, if it finds any instances of maladministration, appropriate recommendations on how to remedy them (Rule 89 RCD).

To date, 10 such studies have been performed. [18] These were: Egypt (2017), Lebanon (2014), Nepal (2012), Brazil (2008), Serbia and Montenegro (2004), Mexico (2003), Sri Lanka (2002), Peru (2001), Egypt (1996), Turkey (1994)

The recommendations of the committee are not legally binding, their implementation can not be enforced. Apart from the fact that he can carry out a follow-up procedure to review the implementation of the recommendations or that the implementation of the recommendations will be discussed in the next state report, no further measures are foreseen (Article 20 (5) FoK, Rule 90).

If the committee is confronted with such serious or systematic torture by a state, it may also bring the matter to the attention of the UN General Assembly. The latter then decide on the further course of action, because extensive or systematic violations of the torture prohibition are considered crimes against humanity according to Art. 7 (1) of the Rome Statute and the International Criminal Court in The Hague is responsible for this, provided that the fallible state does not the International Criminal Court.

== State Cases ==
This procedure is regulated in Chapter 20 of the VerfO. The committee is empowered to consider cases of state where a contracting state claims that another state party is failing to fulfill its obligations under the Convention against Torture (Article 21 FoK). The condition for this is that both states explicitly recognized the competence of the committee when ratifying the treaty (Article 21 (1) FoK, Rule 91, 97 VerO).

In contrast to individual complaints, there are no high formal requirements for state complaints, and the UNHCHR Secretariat is not authorized to declare state complaints inadmissible, as in the case of individual complaints (Art. 22 (5) FoK Individual Complaints, Rule 111 ff.

The task of the committee is to settle the dispute (Article 21 (1) lit e FoK, Rule 98 of the Rules of Procedure). If no amicable agreement is reached, a final report will be prepared, completing the procedure for the committee (Article 21 (1) (h), (ii) FoK, Rule 101 of the VerfO). For international disputes, there are rules, u. a. the agreement for the peaceful settlement of international disputes The states can then turn to the International Court of Justice within six months, provided that neither of the two states made a reservation in the ratification of the treaty (Article 30 FoK).

As a precautionary measure, 12 states rejected the jurisdiction of the International Court of Justice when concluding the contract (Article 30 (1) FoK).

States do not necessarily have to refer to the International Court of Justice, there is also a European Convention on the Peaceful Settlement of Disputes.

For example, on 16 December 1971, Ireland lodged a complaint against England with the ECMR for failing to comply with the prohibition of torture under Article 3 of the ECHR. Ireland could not file the complaint with either the CAT or the CCPR (Article 7 IpbpR), as they did not enter into force until about 10 years later.

=== Note to this judgment of the ECtHR and the consequences (Guantanamo, Abu Graib) ===
In its torture memos on the torture methods in Guantanamo, etc., the US also relied on that judgment of the European Court of Human Rights ECtHR, as the US made a reservation on inhuman and degrading treatment in accordance with Art. 7 IPbpR and Art. 16 FoK. From the ECtHR ruling, the US concluded that these five techniques of interrogation were admissible under US law because it was not torture but, according to the ECtHR, only inhuman and degrading treatment, thus allowed under US law.

=== Obvious oversight of the UN ===
The requirement for a state appeal, according to which all domestic remedies available in the case must be filed and exhausted, unless the procedure takes an undue delay in the application of the remedies (Article 21 (1) (c) FoK) an obvious oversight of the UN, as the complaining state must notify the other state of the abuses by written notice only, and if the matter has not been settled within six months, it may directly contact the committee (Article 21 (1) lit a, b IPbpR).

=== Individual applications ===
The individual complaints gem. Art. 22 FoK is euphemistically referred to as communications (individual communications versus state-to-state complaints). If a state expressly agrees with the individual complaints procedure at the time of conclusion of the contract, the committee may also examine individual complaints against that contracting state (Art. 22 (1) FoK, Rule 102 VerfO).

The procedures of the appeal proceedings are listed in Chapter 21 of the VerfO, as well as the formal requirements for the individual complaints (Rule 104 RMA) and the condition for their admissibility (Rule 113 RPS). The UNHCHR created a complaint form (English: Model complaint form) and a related information sheet.

The complaint must be in writing, it must not be anonymous and must be written in one of the working languages of the committee; for this, the national legal process must be unsuccessful. Only then can a complaint be lodged with the committee, a period for appeal is not provided, but usually a complaint is not accepted after five years (ratione temporis). The complaint may be dismissed on the grounds that the committee has no jurisdiction, since the alleged infringement is not part of the FoK (ratione materiae) or it constitutes an abuse of the right of appeal. The same complaint may not be lodged with any other international body (e.g. the ECtHR, another UN treaty body or similar) (Article 22 (5) of the FoK, Rule 104, 113 of the Rules of Procedure).

Complaints submitted to the UN are first formally reviewed by the Secretariat of UNHCHR. Then the complaint is either rejected or registered and forwarded to the committee (Rule 104. VerfO). There are no statistics on the number of complaints already rejected by the Secretariat.

If the complaint was rejected by the secretariat, the complainant will be notified in a standard letter. It uses the same form for rejecting the complaint filed with the CERD, CAT and the CCPR, in which mostly inadequate justification is ticked, although this is not provided for and instead information would have to be obtained (Rule 105 RCD). If the complaint has been received, the secretariat will prepare a summary - which may alienate the complaint - and forward it to the committee (Rule 106 RMA). The committee then examines the material admissibility of the complaint/summary (Article 22 (5) FoK, Rule 113, 116 VerO). If he declared the appeal inadmissible, then he - unlike the Secretariat - justified his decision of inadmissibility of the appeal. If it has been approved, the summary will be forwarded to the state concerned for comment, which may then raise the objection of inadmissibility (Rule 115 RCD). The committee also tries to reach an amicable agreement. If the state party so agrees, this will be decided in a decision (Discontinuance Decision) and the case is settled.

Only later does he deal with the complaint in terms of content (Rule 118 VerfO). If the committee has found a breach of contract, it gives the state proposals and recommendations on how to remedy them (Article 22 (7) FoK).

The recommendations are not legally binding, their implementation can not be enforced, only a follow-up procedure is planned, in which the implementation of the recommendations is examined by the state and, where appropriate, it will be discussed in the next state reporting procedure. Sanctions are not provided against fallible states. Although in the preamble of FoK the torture ban acc. Art. 7 IPbpR was given as a basis and according to Art. 4 para. 2 IpBPR the prohibition of tort is mandatory international law - it has no consequences for the fallible state, the CAT is only recommended to stop it.

=== Precautionary measures ===
When complaining, interim measures may be required at the same time in the event of irreparable harm. Such requests must be submitted as soon as possible, with the reference Urgent Interim measures, so that the committee has sufficient time to consider the request and order such action. The committee can also take precautionary measures on its own initiative, but they do not make a decision on the admissibility of the complaint or on the finding of a failure by the state (Rule 114 RCD).

=== Complaints to the CAT and the ECHR ===
A complaint, for example, for a violation of the prohibition of torture under Art. 7 IPbpR, Art. 1 FoK and Art. 3 ECHR may not be filed simultaneously with the committee, the ECtHR] or another UN treaty body, so-called "same-subject reservation" (Art. 22 para. 5 lit. a FoK). However, it is permissible for the committee to file a complaint for infringement of Art. 1 FoK Breach of the Torture Prohibition and to file a complaint with the ECtHR for breach of Art. 11 ECHR Freedom of assembly and association, as there is no overlap but concerns various breaches of contract by the same state.

There are complaints that were first filed with, but not accepted by, the ECtHR, with the standard justification: the complaint has no appearance of violations of the rights and freedoms guaranteed by the convention (ECHR) or its Additional Protocols. The complaint subsequently submitted to the UN Committee was then rejected on the ground that it had allegedly been examined by the ECtHR although the ECtHR did not substantively examine the complaint, but did not accept it.

Correspondingly, the decision no. 577/2013 [85] of the CAT Committee of 9 February 2016, i.S. N.B. c. Russia for torture. At the same time, the complainant had filed an identical complaint with the ECtHR (No. 33772/13), which was why the CAT committee rejected the complaint (see decision RZ 8.2). However, in the judgment database HUDOC of the ECHR there is no judgment with the no. 33772/13, as the complaint was refused by the Registry and removed from the register - thus not examined by the ECtHR.

In the meantime, there are decisions from the committee in which he nevertheless examined such complaints.

== General remarks ==
The committee publishes general comments on the interpretation and specification of the various provisions of the Torture Convention. They are intended to clear up misunderstandings and to assist the contracting states in the fulfillment of their contractual obligations. To date, the committee has written four General Comments (GC).

- GC No. 1 (1997): Implementation of Art. 3 FoK (Refoulement Prohibition) in connection with Art. 22 FoK Individual complaints
- GC No. 2 Implementation of Art. 2 FoK Prevention of Torture
- GC No. 3 (2012) Implementation of Art. 14 FoK Reparation
- GC No. 4 (2017) Implementation of Art. 3 FoK (refoulement prohibition) in connection with Art. 22 FoK Individual complaints

== Members of the CAT ==
The members appointed under Art. 17 FoK for four years each

Name	State	Term Expires
Mr. Abderrazak ROUWANE	Morocco	31 December 2025
Ms. Ilvija PUCE	Latvia	31 December 2023
Mr. Todd BUCHWALD	United States	31 December 2025
Ms. MAEDA Naoko	Japan	31 December 2025
Mr. Claude HELLER (chairperson)	Mexico	31 December 2023
Mr. Erdogan ISCAN (Rapporteur)	Turkey	31 December 2023
Mr. Bakhtiyar TUZMUKHAMEDOV (Vice-chairperson)	Russia	31 December 2025
Ms. Ana RACU (Vice-chairperson)	Moldova	31 December 2023
Mr. Sébastien TOUZE (Vice-chairperson)	France	31 December 2023
Mr. LIU Huawen	China	31 December 2025

== Decisions of the CAT ==
Decisions of the CAT Committee
States	Pending	unacceptable	set	violation	No offense	Registered
Germany	1	0	0	1	1	3
Liechtenstein	0	0	0	0	0	0
Austria	0	1	1	1	1	4
Switzerland	22	8	65	16	57	168
Total 66 States	158	70	197	107	165	697

The figures are without the complaints already rejected by the Secretariat of the United Nations High Commissioner for Human Rights (OHCHR). The individual decisions can also be found in the database of the UNO.

== See also ==
- Psychological torture
- European Convention for the Prevention of Torture and Inhuman or Degrading Treatment or Punishment
- International Day in Support of Victims of Torture
- International Rehabilitation Council for Torture Victims
- Use of torture since 1948
- World Organization Against Torture

== Further Information ==
- Deutschland – Rapporte und Berichte in der Datenbank des CAT
- Liechtenstein – Rapporte und Berichte in der Datenbank des CAT
- Österreich – Rapporte und Berichte in der Datenbank des CAT
- Schweiz – Rapporte und Berichte in der Datenbank des CAT

=== Literature ===
- Auswärtiges Amt: ABC der Vereinten Nationen, Menschenrechtspakte und ihre Überprüfungsorgane S. 155 ff., Mai 2017, 9. Auflage, pdf, 308 S.
- CPT: CPT-Standards S. 95 Kap. VII. Straflosigkeit (der Folter) bekämpfen, pdf, 108 S.
- Europarat: Zur unabhängigen und effektiven Untersuchung von Beschwerden gegen die Polizei, CommDH(2009)4, 12. März 2009, pdf, 19 S.
- Manfred Nowak: Einführung in das internationale Menschenrechtssystem. Neuer Wissenschaftlicher Verlag, Wien 2002, ISBN 3-7083-0080-7.
- UNHCHR The Istanbul Protocol Manual on the Effective Investigation and Documentation of Torture and Other Cruel, Inhuman or Degrading Treatment Punishment, New York und Genf 2004, engl., pdf. 81 S.
- UNHCHR: The United Nations Human Rights Treaty System Fact Sheet No. 30/Rev.1; New York und Genf, 2012, pdf. 74 S.
- UNHCHR: Individual Complaint Procedures under the United Nations Human Rights Treaties Fact Sheet No.7/Rev.2, pdf. 20 S.
- UNHCHR: A Handbook for Civil Society Working with the United Nations Human Rights Programme, New York und Genf, 2008, engl., pdf. 206 S.
- UNHCHR: Handbook for Human Rights Treaty Body Members New York und Genf, 2015, engl., pdf. 98 S.
- CAT: The Committee against Torture, Fact Sheet No.17, New York und Genf, pdf. 10 S.
