= Jim Bakhtiar =

Iranian gridiron football player (1934–2022)

No. 34 – Virginia Cavaliers
- Positions: Fullback, Placekicker
- Class: Graduate

Personal information
- Born: January 8, 1934; Tehran, Iran
- Died: January 9, 2022 (aged 88); Albuquerque, New Mexico, U.S.

Career information
- College: Virginia (1955–1957); Calgary Stampeders (1958)

Awards and highlights
- First-team All-American (1957); 2× First-team All-ACC (1956, 1957); Second-team All-ACC (1955); Virginia Cavaliers Jersey No. 34 retired

Jamshid "Jim" Abol Hassen Bakhtiar (January 8, 1934 – January 9, 2022) was an American football player.

== Life and career ==
Jim Bakhtiar was born as Jamshid Abol Hassen Bakhtiar in Tehran, Iran, on January 8, 1934, and emigrated to the United States as a boy. Bakhtiar's father was Abol Ghassem Bakhtiar, his mother was Helen Jeffreys Bakhtiar, and his sister was Laleh, a scholar, author, translator, and clinical psychologist. His nieces are NPR producer, journalist, and author Davar Ardalan, and novelist Lailee Bakhtiar McNair; his nephew is former tennis player Fred McNair.

He attended the University of Virginia where he played college football at the fullback and placekicker positions for the Virginia Cavaliers football team from 1955 to 1957. In September 1956, he set an Atlantic Coast Conference single-game record with 210 rushing yards against VMI. He was selected by the Football Writers Association of America as a first-team back on its 1957 College Football All-America Team.

He later played in the Canadian Football League with the Calgary Stampeders during the 1958 CFL season (where he played 15 games, rushed for 971 yards and scored 4 touchdowns) before enrolling in medical school at the University of Virginia.

He graduated with a medical degree with an emphasis in psychiatry in 1963. He returned to Iran where he established the country's first modern psychiatric unit. Following the Iranian Revolution in 1979, he fled to Turkey with his family and returned to the United States.

He died on January 9, 2022, one day after his 88th birthday.
