= Kamran Diba =

Iranian architect

- Born: 5 March 1937 (age 89); Tehran, Imperial State of Iran
- Education: Howard University
- Known for: Architecture, museum director
- Relatives: Empress Farah Pahlavi (first cousin)

Kamran Diba (Persian: کامران ديبا, born 5 March 1937) is an Iranian architect, visual artist, and museum director. Before the Iranian revolution Diba worked entirely in the public sector in Iran. He resides in Paris, France.

== Biography ==
Kamran Diba was born on 5 March 1937 in Tehran. He is a cousin of Farah Pahlavi, the former empress of Iran. He studied architecture at Howard University, and graduated in 1964. He did a post-graduation year studying sociology.

In 1966, he moved back to Tehran and joined DAZ Consulting Architects, Planners and Engineers. He is known for designing the new campus of Jondishapur University in Ahvaz, the Tehran Museum of Contemporary Art (in collaboration with Nader Ardalan), and the Niavaran Cultural Center in Tehran. In 1986, Diba received the Aga Khan Award for Architecture for Shustar New Town in Khuzestan.

Diba conceived Shushtar New Town in 1972 as housing for employees of the Karun Agro-Industry. Instead of using the standardised industrial housing systems then being promoted in Iran, he based the plan on the closely connected urban fabric of traditional Iranian towns and specified brick as the principal material. The first phase, intended to function as a largely self-contained community for about 4,200 residents, was substantially completed by 1978; the wider five-stage scheme for approximately 30,000 people was never fully realised. In 1967, Diba, Parviz Tanavoli, and Roxana Saba (daughter of Abolhasan Saba) founded the Rasht 29 Club on a northern street near the Amirkabir University of Technology (formerly the Tehran Polytechnic). Rasht 29 Club was named after the street address, and it was a popular hangout amongst artists of the time.

Diba served as the first Director of the Tehran Museum of Contemporary Art from 1976 until 1978.

In spring 1977, he was a visiting critic at Cornell University. inter alia on behalf of Oswald Mathias Ungers. That same year, 1977, Diba left Iran and moved to Paris, as well as spending time in Washington, D.C.

Diba was also an artist and had a handful of painting exhibitions in Iran.

== See also ==
Nader Ardalan
