= Laleh Bakhtiar =

Iranian and American psychologist (1938-2020)

- لاله بختیار
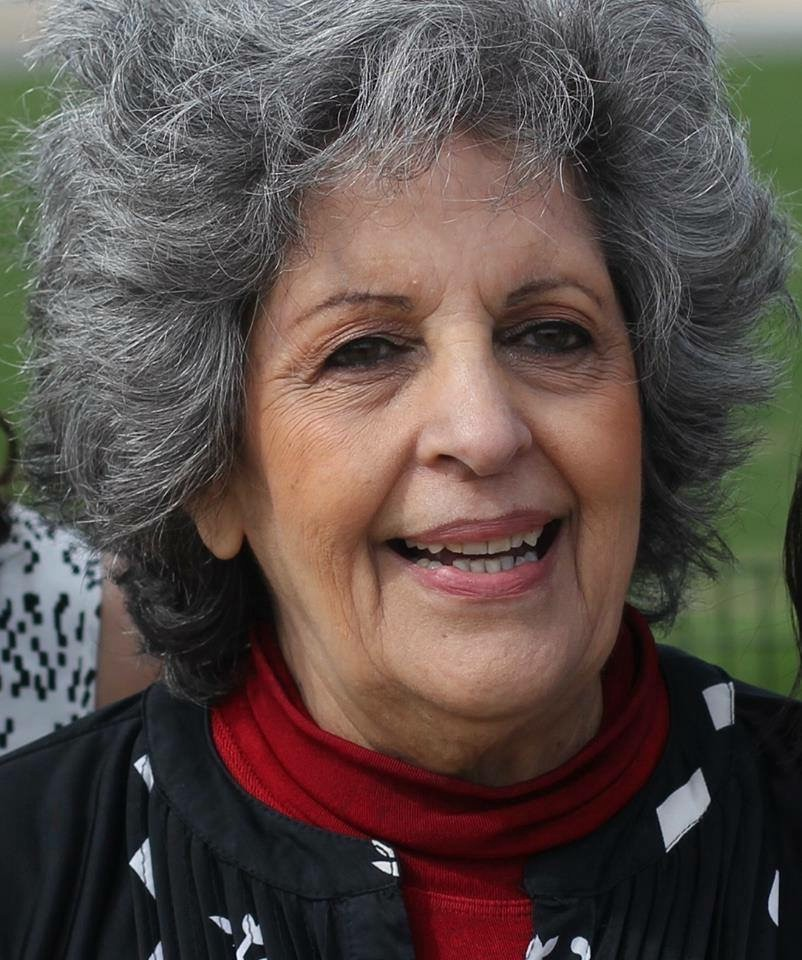
- Born: Mary Nell Bakhtiar; July 29, 1938; Tehran, Iran
- Died: October 18, 2020 (aged 82); Chicago, Illinois, United States
- Education: Chatham College (BA); University of New Mexico (PhD)
- Occupations: Psychologist, author
- Known for: The Sublime Quran; Institute of Traditional Psychology
- Spouse: Nader Ardalan (m. 1964; div. 1976)
- Children: Mani Helene Ardalan Farhadi (daughter); Iran Davar Ardalan (daughter); Karim Ardalan (son)
- Parents: Abol Ghassem Bakhtiar (father); Helen Jeffreys Bakhtiar (mother)
- Family: Jim Bakhtiar (brother); Lailee McNair (niece); Fred McNair (nephew)

Laleh Mehree Bakhtiar (born Mary Nell Bakhtiar; July 29, 1938 – October 18, 2020) was an Iranian and American Islamic and Sufi scholar, author, translator, and psychologist. She produced a gender-neutral translation of the Quran, The Sublime Quran, and challenged the status quo on the Arabic word daraba, traditionally translated as "beat" — a word that she said has been used as justification for abuse of Muslim women. Her translation, published in 2007, was the first translation of the Quran by an American woman.

== Early life ==
Laleh Bakhtiar was born as Mary Nell Bakhtiar on July 29, 1938, in Tehran, Pahlavi Iran. Her mother was an American named Helen Woodsen Jeffreys, and her father was an Iranian physician named Abol Ghassem Bakhtiar. Bakhtiar grew up as a Christian alongside two older sisters with her mother in Los Angeles and Washington, D.C. She became a Catholic at age eight. Her mother, however, was a Presbyterian.

Bakhtiar received her BA degree in history from Chatham College in Pittsburgh, Pennsylvania, graduating in 1960.

While visiting her mother in Isfahan, Bakhtiar was unhappy with being named "Mary Nell". Her mother talked with her friend and Bakhtiari tribal chief, Yahya Khan, who gave Bakhtiar the Persian name "Laleh" in 1957. She then went by the name professionally. Earlier, in Cambridge, Massachusetts, at the age of 19, she met the Iranian philosopher Seyyed Hossein Nasr, who encouraged her to pursue Islam both personally and academically. Bakhtiar by then was "a Christian without any particular denomination" after drifting away from Catholicism. When she was 26, she moved to Iran to study Sufism and Quranic Arabic at the University of Tehran under Nasr, who continued to mentor Bakhtiar for 30 years.

== Career ==
Bakhtiar wrote, or translated over 150 books on Islam, including The Sense of Unity with Nader Ardalan, The Sublime Quran, and Sufi Expressions of the Mystic Quest. She was also the president of the Institute of Traditional Psychology and a scholar-in-residence at Kazi Publications.

=== The Sublime Quran (2007) ===
Her translation of the Quran, The Sublime Quran, was published in 2007. Bakhtiar's translation attempts to take a female perspective, and to admit alternative meanings to Arabic terms that are ambiguous or the subject of scholarly debate. For example, she translates kāfirūn as "those who are unthankful", rather than the common translations of "unbelievers" or "infidels". In Chapter 4, Verse 34, concerning how husbands should treat rebellious wives, she translates the Arabic word daraba as "go away", rather than "beat" or "hit". Bakhtiar believed these translations would foster understanding between Muslims and non-Muslims.

== Personal life ==
Bakhtiar was engaged in 1960, and married in 1964 to Iranian architect Nader Ardalan, while she was a nondenominational Christian; she converted to Islam in 1964. She divorced Ardalan in 1976, and returned to the U.S. in 1988.

She received her Ph.D. from the University of New Mexico in educational psychology. She moved to Chicago in 1992 and was a Nationally Certified Counselor.

She died on October 18, 2020, in Chicago from myelodysplastic syndrome.

== Family ==
Bakhtiar had three children, including Iran Davar (now Davar Ardalan).

Her older brother was Jamshid Bakhtiar, better known as "Jim", who was a psychiatrist. He had been a fullback and placekicker at the University of Virginia and he was selected by the Football Writers Association of America as a first-team back in its 1957 College Football All-America Team. Through her sister Parveen, Bakhtiar's niece is novelist Lailee McNair and her nephew is former tennis player Fred McNair.

== Awards and recognition ==
In May 2016, Bakhtiar was awarded a lifetime achievement award from the Mohammed Webb Foundation in Chicago.

On November 15, 2020, Daisy Khan, founder of the Women's Islamic Initiative in Spirituality and Equality (WISE), honored Bakhtiar with a lifetime achievement award.

== Criticism ==
Mohammad Ashraf, head of the Islamic Society of North America (Canada), said he would not permit The Sublime Quran to be sold at the society's bookstore because Bakhtiar had not studied at an accredited Muslim institution. "This woman-friendly translation will be out of line and will not fly too far", he commented. "Women have been given a very good place in Islam."

Khaled Abou El Fadl, an Islamic law professor from the University of California, Los Angeles (UCLA), said that Bakhtiar "has a reputation as an editor, not [as] an Islamic scholar" and that three years of Classical Arabic were not enough. and that he "is troubled by a method of translating that relies on dictionaries and other English translations". Bakhtiar disagreed with such criticism saying, "The criticism is [there] because I'm a woman." She also said that some other well-known translators were not considered Islamic scholars.

== Legacy ==
In December 2009, the American novelist Dave Eggers recommended The Sublime Quran on Oprah.com. Eggers said that "[I]t opened me up to the beauty of the faith in a way that no interpretation of the text had before. And, of course, in the book you find, very clearly, Islam's dedication to social justice, to peace and to the less fortunate."

Prince Ghazi Bin Muhammad from Jordan approved of Bakhtiar's interpretation of the Quran. The author Reza Aslan also praised the translation, saying, "For the first time a woman has been able to reengage the scripture from a different point of view, thus producing a gender neutral translation that is far more consistent with the message and spirit of the Quran than any previous translation."

Scott Alexander, the Catholic-Muslim Studies Chair at the Catholic Theological Union, stated that "her contributions to the study of Islam in the West have been in a stunning array of different of capacities and have resulted in a legacy that is truly monumental. As an author, Dr. Bakhtiar has written a number of books that stand as landmarks in the writings of Sufi masters and especially Sufi women in the late twentieth and early twenty-first / early fifteenth centuries."

Shaida Khan, the executive director of the Domestic Harmony Foundation, a non-profit organization working against domestic violence within Middle Eastern and South Asian Muslim communities, said about Bakhtiar that "as a female scholar, she is considered a knowledgeable and meritorious persona in the annals of Islamic literature. She is an exemplary individual particularly for women who have been victimized by domestic violence, and also for all Muslim women to look up to."

Ingrid Mattson, the former president of the Islamic Society of North America, and Professor of Islamic Studies at Hartford Seminary, reflecting on Bakhtiar's life's work, said "What could be more welcome than an examination of the life of a Muslim woman who is neither a silent victim of oppression, waiting to be saved by a secular revolution, nor an apologist for misguided ideology, but an intelligent woman of faith and integrity? Laleh Bakhtiar has lived a remarkable life - but a life with which we can relate, because while some of her experiences appear exotic to the typical American, her values and principles are not."

Marcia Hermansen, the director of the Islamic World Studies Program and a professor in the theology department at Loyola University Chicago, said that "One of things that strikes me about the [Sublime Quran] translation is how its reception in the 'mainstream' Muslim community—at least in North America, made it less acceptable or even unacceptable for Muslim community leaders to simply repeat misogynistic interpretations."

== Publications ==
=== Translations ===
- The Sublime Quran. Translated by Bakhtiar, Laleh. Kazi Publications Inc. 2007. ISBN 978-1567447507.

=== Authored books ===
- Bakhtiar, Laleh; Ardalan, Nader (1973). The Sense of Unity: the Sufi Tradition in Persian Architecture. Chicago and London: University of Chicago Press.
- Bakhtiar, Laleh; Rose, Bakhtiari (2002). Helen of Tus: Her Odyssey from Idaho to Iran. Kazi Publications Inc. ISBN 978-1930637184.
- Bakhtiar, Laleh; Bakhtiar, Lailee (2003). Abol Ghassem of Tus: The Epic Journey of Abol Ghassem Bakhtiar, M. D. Kazi Publications Inc. ISBN 978-1930637474.
