= Helen Jeffreys Bakhtiar =

American nurse (1905–1973)

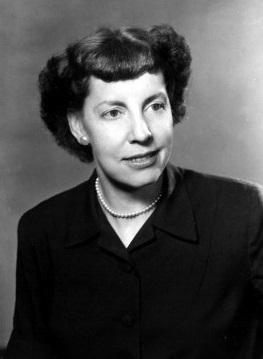
- Born: Helen Woodsen Jeffreys; December 24, 1905; Weiser, Idaho, U.S.
- Died: January 30, 1978 (aged 72); Tehran, Iran
- Education: University of California, Los Angeles; Columbia University
- Occupation: Nurse
- Spouse: Abol Ghassem Bakhtiar (m. 1927–c. 1940; div.)
- Children: 7, including Jim Bakhtiar, and Laleh Bakhtiar
- Relatives: Fred McNair (grandson); Lailee McNair (granddaughter)

Helen Jeffreys Bakhtiar (née Helen Woodsen Jeffreys; December 24, 1905 – January 30, 1978) was an American nurse and military personnel, who had worked in the 1950s in rural communities in Iran. She has a mountain named after her, Mount Helen, in the Chaharmahal and Bakhtiari province of Iran. She was one of the earliest American to marry an Iranian in 1927; and the first community health nurse in Iran.

== Early life, family ==
Helen Woodsen Jeffreys was born on December 24, 1905, in Weiser, Idaho, to parents Nellie (née McRoberts) and James Woodson Jeffreys. She studied nursing at the University of California.

After graduation she moved to New York City and worked at a hospital in Harlem. She married Iranian physician, Abol Ghassem Bakhtiar on October 21, 1927, in New York City. She may have been the first American to marry an Iranian. She learned to speak Persian fluently, but with an accent.

== Career ==
In 1931, the Bakhtiar family moved to Iran, and her husband opened a private hospital. She travelled with her husband to rural areas of the Chaharmahal and Bakhtiari province where they educated and medically treated underprivileged people.

She returned to the United States from 1939 until 1945. During this time period she returned to her studies, and attended the University of California, Los Angeles and received a degree in public health nursing. She also obtained a degree in midwifery from Columbia University in New York in the 1950s.

She was military personnel as part of the Point Four Program, a U.S. foreign aid program established in 1949 by President Harry S. Truman. She was only one of ten nurse officers assigned to Iran.

Bakhtiar returned to Iran in 1951, to lead public health nursing in a national community health initiative. Bakhtiar was the first community health nurse in Iran. She joined a mobile team that included a doctor, and sanitary engineer to visit the rural areas of Iran. Part of their public health team's goal was the reduction of malaria cases, which had dropped some 85% in 1951. She retired from government service in 1959, due to her declining health.

== Death and legacy ==
Bakhtiar died on January 30, 1978, in Tehran.

She has a mountain named after her, Mount Helen, in the Chaharmahal and Bakhtiari province of Iran. She also has a book published about her life, Helen of Tus: Her Odyssey from Idaho to Iran (2002) by Laleh Bakhtiar and Bakhtiari Rose.

== See also ==
- Florence Breed Khan, American Bahá'í, also early American to marry an Iranian
