= Iran Centre of Management Studies =

Iran Centre for Management Studies
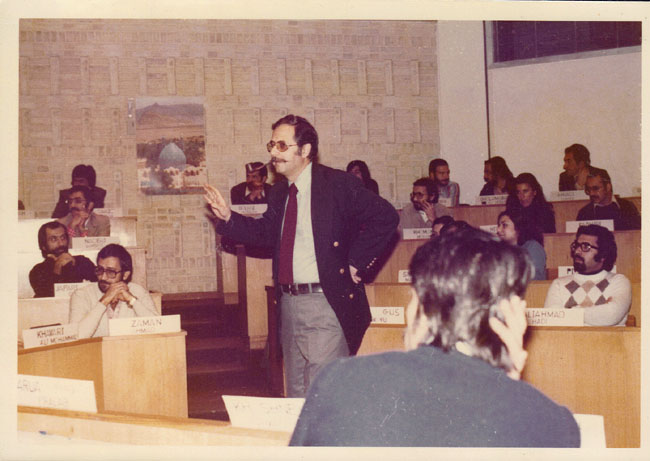
- Type: University
- Established: 1971
- Academic staff: Experienced University lecturers and Industry Managers
- Students: 500 (1972-1980)
- Location: Tehran, Iran
- Campus: Hosseini Rad Alley, Valiasr Street
- Website: www.icms.ac.ir/en

Iran Center for Management Studies (ICMS) was an institute located in Tehran, Iran. It was established in 1971 with the aim of providing graduate-level training for future managerial and leadership positions in business, government and other institutions in Iran.

== History ==
ICMS was founded with the objective of creating an independent institution for management studies at the graduate level. The ICMS was designed with inspiration from the Harvard Business School (HBS) curriculum. The teaching staff was predominantly composed of HBS professors who were on a break from their duties at Harvard. However, the original ICMS program was discontinued in 1980.

== Architecture ==
The ICMS building, located on Iranzman Street, Shahrak Gharb, Tehran, is an example of contemporary Iranian architecture.

== Publications ==
Apart from its services and research contributions, ICMS is also known for publishing the Journal of Industrial Engineering and Management Studies (JIEMS).

== Library (Central Pavilion) ==
The library is located in the center of the garden and has three floors in the shape of an octagon.
