= Souq Sharq =

Shopping mall in Kuwait City, Kuwait

Souk Sharq
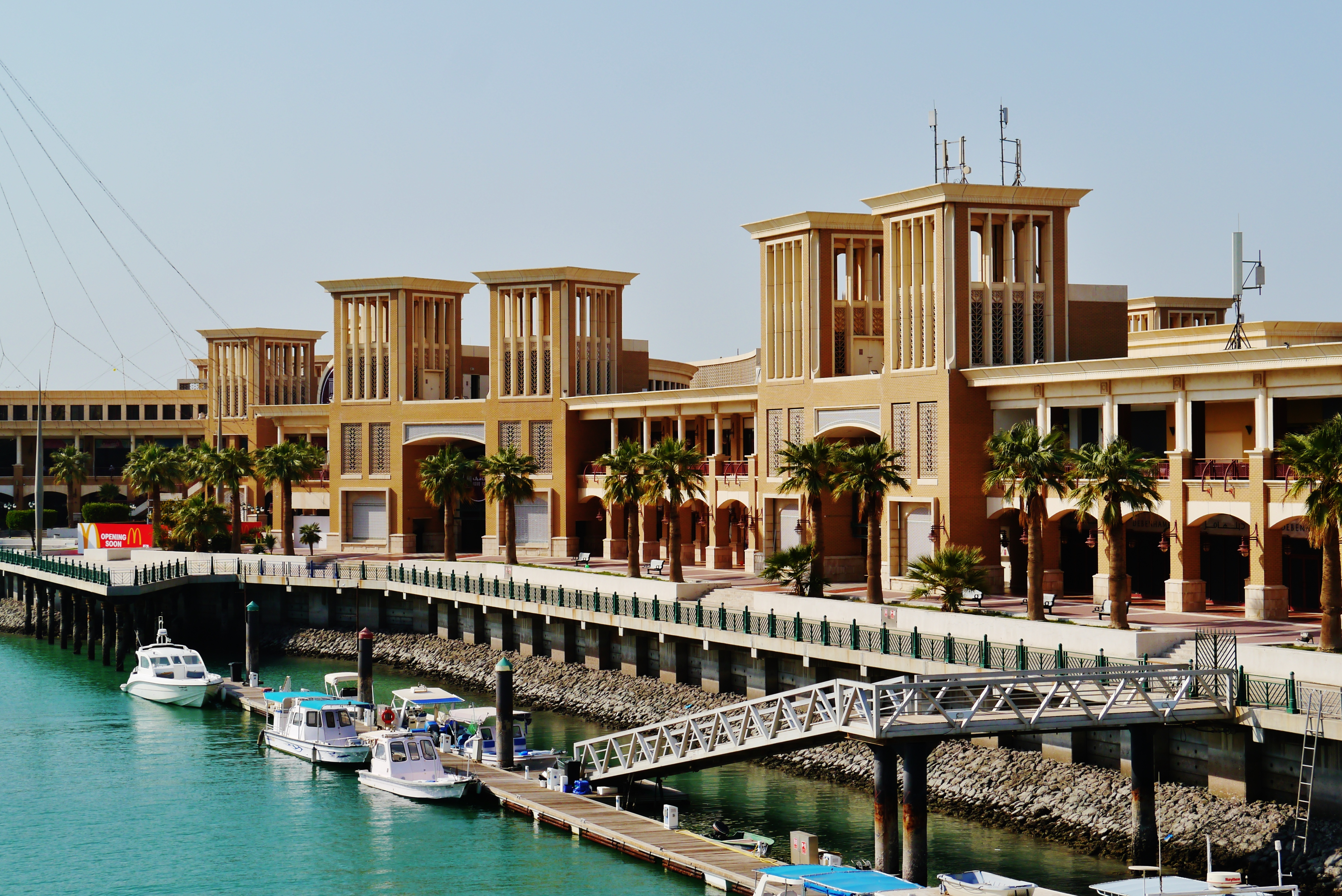
- The Souq Shaq and marina in 2022
- Location: Sharq, Kuwait City, Kuwait
- Address: 29.3891382°N 47.9805091°E
- Opened: 30 September 1998
- Closed: January 31, 2026
- Floor area: 55,567 m^{2} (598,120 sq ft)
- Floors: 2

The Souk Sharq was a major shopping center in Kuwait City, Kuwait. The center began as a traditional souq but as the city has undergone investment it has expanded into a modernized shopping mall of approximately 55,567 m^{2} (598,120 sq ft) area.Construction of Souq Sharq Waterfront Market, one of the most popular shopping centers in Kuwait City, began in 1994. It was built at a cost of approximately 32 million Kuwaiti Dinars (KWD) and was officially inaugurated in 1998. The project was built under a BOT (Build-Operate-Transfer) contract.

== Overview ==
On its two floors, there is a wide variety of retail outlets and many well-known high-street shops such as Britain's Debenham's, River Island, Next, GNC, Boots, Mothercare, Zara and The Body Shop. It also contains designer Charles Jourdan, Nokia and Sony. There are numerous cafes and restaurants.

The water-clock on the ground floor is a 5.5 m (18 ft) structure, constructed by Professor Bernard Gitton.

On 29 March 2003, the government of Kuwait announced an Iraqi rocket had hit the complex causing damages but no casualties.

In 2023, a legal dispute arose between the Ministry of Finance and the National Real Estate Company, the operator of Souq Sharq. The company argued that its lease had been renewed for an additional 20 years with government approval in 2020 and filed court proceedings seeking recognition of the extension. The Ministry of Finance disputed this claim and ordered the evacuation of the complex by January 31, 2026. By this date, nearly all stores had closed. The property was subsequently awarded to a new investor under a long-term development agreement.
