= Lailee Bakhtiar =

American writer, journalist (born 1951)

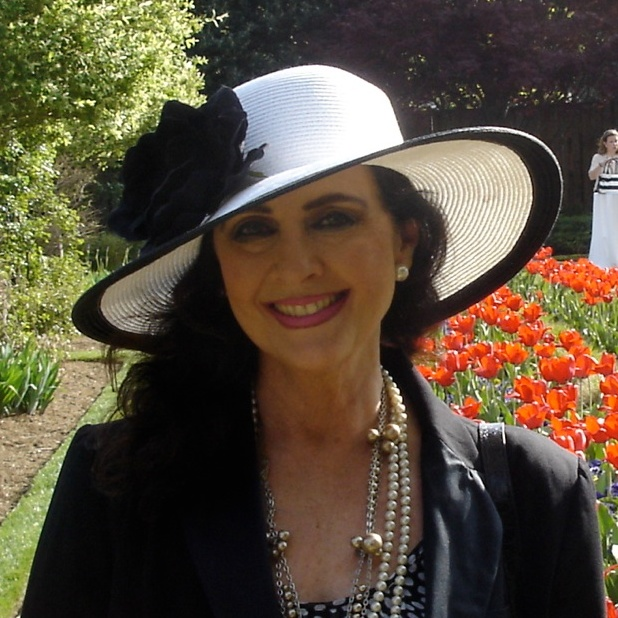
- Lailee Bakhtiar at the United States Naval Academy (2004)
- Born: Lailee Inez McNair; June 10, 1951 (age 75); Washington, D.C., U.S.
- Other names: Lailee van Dillen, Lailee Bakhtiar van Dillen, Lailee McNair Bakhtiar
- Education: University of North Carolina at Chapel Hill (BA), Notre Dame de Namur University (MA), College of San Mateo
- Occupations: Poet, novelist, journalist, television host, French teacher, fashion model
- Spouse(s): Erik van Dillen (m. 1974–?; div.)
- Children: 3
- Parents: Frederick Vallette McNair III (father); Parveen Bakhtiar (mother)
- Relatives: Fred McNair (brother), Jim Bakhtiar (uncle), Laleh Bakhtiar (aunt), Abol Ghassem Bakhtiar (maternal grandfather), Frederick Vallette McNair Jr. (paternal grandfather), Frederick Vallette McNair (paternal great-grandfather)

Lailee Bakhtiar (née Lailee Inez McNair, formerly Lailee van Dillen; born June 10, 1951), is an American poet and novelist. She previously worked as a journalist, television host, French teacher, and model. Her publications include Severn Sky Sonnets & Poems (2024), and Esther Entering Your Destiny (2021), a non-fiction book about the historical and Biblical figure of Esther of the Old Testament Book of Esther. She lives in Annapolis, Maryland.

== Early life and family ==
Lailee Inez McNair was born on June 10, 1951, in Washington, D.C. She was raised in Chevy Chase Village, Montgomery County, Maryland, with her parents Parveen Bakhtiar and Frederick McNair and her five brothers, including Frederick V. McNair IV. She was named after her mother's favorite poet, Nizami, and his poem, Layla and Majnun. She attended St. John's Episcopal Church in Chevy Chase, Maryland. She began her community service as Miss 16 of Washington, D.C. in 1966. She speaks two languages: English and French, and studied Spanish, Persian, and Arabic.

Bakhtiar's father was Frederick Vallette McNair III, born in 1922 in Annapolis, Maryland, and served in World War II in the Pacific on the USS Leyte Gulf. Her grandfather, Captain Frederick Vallette McNair Jr., U.S. Naval Academy class of 1903, was awarded the Congressional Medal of Honor, and her great-grandfather Rear Admiral Frederick Vallette McNair, class of 1857, was a USNA former superintendent in 1898. She is descended from Scottish and English families on her father's side, who came to the U.S., settling in Newtown, Pennsylvania.

Her mother Parveen Bakhtiar, born in Tehran, Iran, and was a professional visual artist. Her maternal grandfather was Dr. Abol Ghassem Bakhtiar was of Borujen, and her grandmother, an American nurse, Helen Jeffreys Bakhtiar of Weiser, Idaho. Her maternal uncle was football player, Jim Bakhtiar, in the Sports Hall of Fame at the University of Virginia.

== Education ==
Bakhtiar received a Bachelor of Arts degree in 1973 in French from the University of North Carolina at Chapel Hill, and a Master in Arts degree in 1979 in French from the Notre Dame de Namur University in Belmont, California. She was a cheerleader in college.

Upon graduation from UNC in Chapel Hill, North Carolina, Bakhtiar moved to New York City, where she was a flight attendant for Pan American Airlines in 1973. She also worked as a fashion model in her 20s.

Her novels Harem Letters and sequel They Shake the Desert Sands were inspired by her study of Montesquieu's Persian Letters. She matriculated in courses on journalism, short story writing, and creative writing under Dr. Jim Bell of College of San Mateo, R. B. Sweet of San Jose State University, and courses offered by the local conferences. She was on the board of the local Peninsula Press Club and the Burlingame Library Foundation.

In Annapolis, she obtained certification in Year 1 & Year 2 in the C. S. Lewis Fellows Program. She was inspired in her faith. Her previous study of Blaise Pascal and Victor Hugo continued.

== Career ==
Noted for her poetry: "Severn Sky Sonnets & Poems" 2024, City Dock Poetry (2014), Chai (1998), and Mending Nations (2000), she was one of the participants in the Los Angeles Times Festival of Books, August 1999; The San Francisco Bay Area Book Festival, November 1998; and The National Press Club 21st Annual Book Fair, Washington, D.C., November 1998. Her nonfiction book Afghanistan's Blue Treasure Lapis Lazuli (2011) has an introduction by Dr. Pierre Bariand former curator of the Pierre and Marie Curie Museum at the Sorbonne.

=== TV host ===
Bakhtiar was the former host/producer of a local show Writers Forum and Book Review (1985–2000) hosting 50 programs for Washington Post/Newsweek cable TV in Burlingame, California followed by her hosting/producing a community book program for PBS KCSM TV, Authors & Critics, a television series in San Mateo, California for ten years (1990–2000), including a total of 117 programs, that was offered nationally to PBS affiliates on December 7, 1998.

=== Journalist ===
During her time on the Grand Prix tennis tour with her husband Erik van Dillen she wrote 50 articles for sport magazines in 7 countries (France, Luxembourg, Netherlands, Singapore, England, Austria, and the United States) on tennis professionals Chris Evert, Jimmy Connors, Bjorn Borg, John McEnroe, and others in Tennis World Magazine in England where she was a contributing editor as well as Tennis in Singapore. She wrote articles on the Honorable Andrew Young, former mayor of Atlanta and a former United Nations Ambassador, and Becky London, the daughter of author Jack London.

=== Speaker ===
Bakhtiar spoke as one of the participants at the UNESCO Culture of Peace: Women Making It Happen at the Dag Hammarskjold Auditorium, United Nations, New York, on March 2, 2000. She participated in The Gulf and The Globe Conference 2009 at the United States Naval Academy in Annapolis. Her speeches to local events included Women in Communication, American Association of University Women, and the Jack London Writers Conference.

== Personal life ==
She was married at All Saints Episcopal Church, in Chevy Chase in November 1974 to tennis pro and Davis Cup player Erik van Dillen. They had three children, Vincent (1981–2023), Soraya, and Hague, and divorced.

== Publications ==
=== Books ===
- Bakhtiar van Dillen, Lailee (1997). Chai, Persian Tea. SERA Publishing. ISBN 978-1891165085.
- Bakhtiar van Dillen, Lailee (1998). The Roses of Isfahan. SERA Publishing. ISBN 978-1891165047.
- Bakhtiar van Dillen, Lailee (1999). Harem Letters (novel). SERA Publishing.
- Bakhtiar, Lailee (2002). Mending Nations. SERA Publishing. ISBN 978-1891165115.
- Bakhtiar, Laleh; Bakhtiar, Lailee (2003). Abol Ghassem of Tus: The Epic Journey of Abol Ghassem Bakhtiar, M. D. Kazi Publications Inc. ISBN 978-1930637474.
- Bakhtiar van Dillen, Lailee (2009). Midnight Tales: Seasonal Ghost Stories with Happy Endings (children's book). SERA Publishing. ISBN 978-1891165078.
- McNair Bakhtiar, Lailee (2009). Severn Sky Sonnets & Poems.
- McNair Bakhtiar, Lailee; Richter, Sue (2010). They Shake the Desert Sands (novel). Sera Books. ISBN 978-1891165023.
- McNair Bakhtiar, Lailee (2012). Afghanistan's Blue Treasure: Lapis Lazuli. Front Porch Publishing. ISBN 978-0615573700.
- McNair Bakhtiar, Lailee (2014). City Dock Poetry. RedDot.com Publishing. ISBN 978-1935911128.
- McNair Bakhtiar, Lailee (2024). Esther Entering Your Destiny: Knock and it Shall Be Opened. Uptown Press Inc. ISBN 9781935911425.

=== Articles ===
- Bakhtiar van Dillen, Lailee (January 14, 1998). "Maman Bozorg & the bad bad revolution; a review of Susanne Pari's novel". The Iranian.
