= Bakhtiyar Tuzmukhamedov =

Russian international lawyer (born 1955)

Bakhtiyar R. Tuzmukhamedov
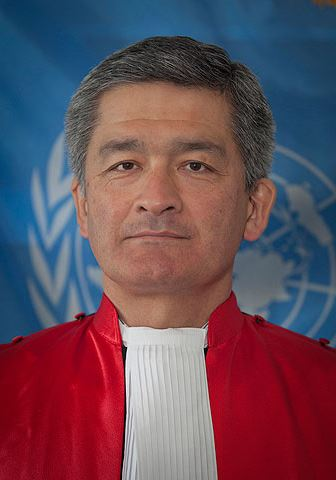
- Tuzmukhamedov in 2014

Judge of the International Criminal Tribunal for Rwanda
- In office 18 August 2009 – 21 December 2015
- Appointed by: Ban Ki-moon

Personal details
- Born: March 30, 1955 (age 71) Moscow, Soviet Union
- Parent: Rais Tuzmukhamedov (father)
- Education: Moscow State Institute of International Relations, Harvard Law School
- Occupation: lawyer, judge

Bakhtiyar Raisovich Tuzmukhamedov (Russian: Бахтияр Раисович Тузмухамедов; born March 30, 1955) is a Russian international lawyer, who served as a judge at the International Criminal Tribunal for Rwanda from 18 August 2009 until 21 December 2015.

== Biography ==
Bakhtiyar Tuzmukhamedov is the son of Rais Tuzmukhamedov, who was a leading Soviet international lawyer, specializing in national liberation and decolonization issues throughout the 1950s–1960s. Tuzmukhamedov attended the Moscow State Institute of International Relations, graduating in 1977. In 1983, he was conferred with a degree of the Candidate of Juridical Science. His candidate dissertation covered UN work with regard to the Indian Ocean peace zone proposal. In 1994, he received an LL.M. from Harvard Law School.

== Professional life ==
He was a longtime professor of international Law at the Diplomatic Academy in Moscow. Prior to that, from 1977 to 1984, he was a Research Fellow, at the Law of Sea Division, Institute of Merchant Marine.
