= Abol Ghassem Bakhtiar =

Iranian physician (1872–1971)

- ابوالقاسم بختیار
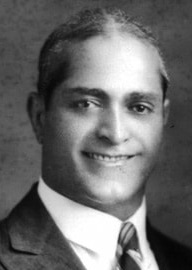
- Abol Ghassem Bakhtiar
- Born: c. 1872; Borujen, Qajar Iran
- Died: 1971 (aged 99); Tehran, Pahlavi Iran
- Other names: Abul Qasim Bakhtiar, A. G. Bakhtiar
- Education: Columbia University; University of Iowa; University of South Dakota
- Occupation: Physician
- Spouse(s): Helen Woodsen Jeffreys (m. 1927–c. 1940; div.); Bibi Turan Zargham (m. 1942–1971)
- Children: 17, including Jim Bakhtiar, and Laleh Bakhtiar

Abol Ghassem Bakhtiar (Persian: ابوالقاسم بختیار; c. 1872 – 1971) was an Iranian physician, focused on obstetrics and gynaecology. He is known as a founder of faculty of Tehran University of Medical Sciences. His name is also spelled as Abul Qasim Bakhtiar, and A. G. Bakhtiar.

== Life and career ==
Abol Ghassem Bakhtiar was born in c. 1872, in Borujen, in the Chaharmahal and Bakhtiari province, Qajar Iran. He lost his mother at birth. Bakhtiar began living with his father Jafar Qoli Khan Bakhtiar, who was a dervish, and when he was 6 years old he lost his father. He worked in many odd jobs to support himself, while continuing his education in Borujen. In 1910, he moved to Tehran.

He became a student at the American High School (later known as Alborz High School) in Tehran at the age of 39, under the consent of Dr. Samuel Jordan due to his age gap. After graduation from Alborz High School in 1918, and Samuel Jordan helped Bakhtiar move to the United States to continue his education.

He attended Columbia University in New York City, and continued his education at University of Iowa, and the University of South Dakota. Bakhtiar has a doctorate degree from Syracuse University in Syracuse, New York, which was obtained when he was 55 years old.

In 1931, Bakhtiar returned to Iran with his wife and family, and opened a private hospital. Around 1934, through his efforts and those of his colleagues, the Tehran University of Medical Sciences was established and he was appointed as the vice-dean of the medical school. He was the founder of the dissection hall of Tehran University. Bakhtiar taught obstetrics and gynecology, and minor surgery to medical students.

In 1939, Bakhtiar moved to Khuzestan to work as the chief surgeon of the Anglo-Persian Oil Company. He moved in 1942 to the Masjed Soleyman Oil Company Hospital (now Imam Khomeini Hospital) in Masjed Soleyman in Khuzestan province, Iran.

== Personal life ==
He married American nurse, Helen Woodsen Jeffreys, and together they had 7 children, including Jim Bakhtiar, and Laleh Bakhtiar. Helen traveled with her husband to remote areas of the Chaharmahal and Bakhtiari province in Iran, and educating and medically treated underprivileged people. His first marriage ended in divorce around 1940.

His second marriage was at age 70, around 1942, to a Bakhtiyari named Bibi Turan Zargham, and they had another 10 children in Iran: 6 daughters and 4 sons.

He was buried next to the tomb of Abu al-Qasim Ferdowsi in the Razavi Khorasan province.
