= List of European Court of Justice rulings =

The following is a list of notable judgments of the European Court of Justice.

== Principles of Union Law ==
=== Direct effect ===
==== Treaties, Regulations and Decisions ====
- Van Gend en Loos v. Nederlandse Administratie der Belastingen 26/62 [1963] ECR 1

"The [European Economic] Community constitutes a new legal order of international law for the benefit of which the [Member] States have limited their sovereign rights".

"The Court ... has the jurisdiction to answer ... questions referred that ... relate to the interpretation of the treaty."

- Franz Grad 9/70 [1970] ECR-825
- Commission v Italy 39/72 [1973] ECR 101
- Reyners 2/74 [1974] ECR 631
- Defrenne II [1976] ECR 455
- Amsterdam Bulb 50/76 [1977] ECR 137

States can provide in national legislation for appropriate sanctions which are not provided for in the regulation, and can continue to regulate various related issues which are not covered in the regulation.

- Zaera 126/86 [1987] ECR 3697
- Azienda Agricola C-403/98 [2001] ECR I-103
- Steinberg T-17/10 [2012] 625
- Sharif University T-181/13 [2014] 607

==== Directives ====
- Van Duyn v Home Office 41/74 [1974] ECR 1337
- Ratti 148/78 [1979] ECR 1629

Member States are precluded by their failure to implement a directive properly from refusing to recognise its binding effect in cases where it is pleaded against them, thus they cannot rely on their failure to implement the directive in time.

- Becker 8/81 [1982] ECR 53
- von Colson 14/83 [1984] ECR 1891
- Kolpinghuis Nijmegen 80/86 [1987] ECR 3969

There is no obligation of harmonious interpretation where the national measure, interpreted in the light of the directive, would impose criminal liability.

- Fratelli Costanzo 103/88 [1989] ECR 1839
- Foster C-188/89 [1990] ECR I-3313
- Marshall v Southampton and South-West Hampshire Area Health Authority Case 152/84 [1986] ECR I-4367
- Faccini Dori C-91/92 [1994] ECR I-3325
- CIA Security C-194/94 [1996] ECR I-2201
- Arcaro C-168/95 [1996] ECR I-4705

Notwithstanding the Kolpinghuis ruling, the creation of any other kind of legal disadvantage of detriment, save for criminal liability, is very well possible.

- Unilever Italia C-443/98 [2000] ECR I-7535
- Commission v Spain, case C-417/99, 13 September 2001: failure to designate the competent authorities and bodies responsible for implementing Directive 96/62/EC on ambient air quality. Directives are to be transposed into national law "with precision, clarity and transparency".

=== Primacy ===
- Costa v ENEL 6/64 [1964] ECR 585

Community law takes precedence over the Member States' own domestic law.

- Simmenthal II 106/77 [1978] ECR 629

National courts are obliged to set aside provisions of national law which are incompatible with Community law. The Court ruled that:

A national court which is called upon, within the limits of its jurisdiction, to apply provisions of Community law is under a duty to give full effect to those provisions, if necessary refusing of its own motion to apply any conflicting provision of national legislation, even if adopted subsequently, and it is not necessary for the court to request or await the prior setting aside of such provisions by legislative or other constitutional means.

- Marleasing C-106/89 ECR I-7321

National law must be interpreted and applied, insofar as possible, so as to avoid a conflict with a Community rule.

- Factortame I C-213/89 [1990] ECR I-2433

Duty on national courts to secure the full effectiveness of Community law, even where it is necessary to create a national remedy where none had previously existed.

=== Enforcement of EU law ===
EU law has not established its own system for its enforcement or for aggrieved parties to seek remedies for breach of EU law. In the absence of such a system,

It is clear from the case-law that ... it is for the domestic legal system of each Member State to designate the courts and tribunals having jurisdiction and to lay down the detailed procedural rules governing actions for safeguarding rights which individuals derive from Community law, provided, first, that such rules are not less favourable than those governing similar domestic actions (principle of equivalence) and, secondly, that they do not render virtually impossible or excessively difficult the exercise of rights conferred by Community law (principle of effectiveness) (Joined Cases C-430/93 and C-431/93 Van Schijndel and van Veen [1995] ECR I-4705, paragraph 17, and Case C-129/00 Commission v Italy [2003] ECR I-14637, paragraph 25).

- Joined Cases C-430/93 and C-431/93 Van Schijndel and van Veen introduced the principles of equivalence and effectiveness
- Joined Cases C-222/05 to C-225/05, van der Weerd et al, a series of Dutch cases involving the Ministry of Agriculture, Nature and Food Quality: Community law does not require a national court ... to raise of its own motion a plea alleging infringement of the provisions of Community legislation, since neither the principle of equivalence nor the principle of effectiveness require it to do so.

=== Rejection of the reciprocity principles of general international law ===
- Commission v. Luxembourg and Belgium, joined cases 90 and 91/63 [1964] ECR 625

"[I]n [the defendants'] view, … international law allows a party, injured by the failure of another party to perform its obligations, to withhold performance of its own … However, this relationship between the obligations of parties cannot be recognized under Community law ... The treaty is not limited to creating reciprocal obligations ... but establishes a new legal order ... [T]he basic concept of the treaty requires that the Member States not take the law into their own hands."

=== Fundamental rights ===
- Stauder 29/69 [1969] ECR 419

"Fundamental rights [are] enshrined in the general principles of Community law and protected by the Court."

- Internationale Handelsgesellschaft 11/70 [1970] ECR 1125

Fundamental rights are an integral part of the general principles of law the observance of which the Court ensures.

- Nold 4/73 [1974] ECR 491, §13

When protecting fundamental rights, "the Court is bound to draw inspiration from constitutional traditions common to the Member States, and it cannot therefore uphold measures which are incompatible with fundamental rights recognised and protected by the Constitutions of those States." The Court can also draw on international human rights treaties to which Member States have collaborated or are signatories.

- Carpenter C-60/00 [2002] ECR I-6279

Fundamental rights affect the scope and application of Community law. In Carpenter, the Court weaved principles of respect for family and private life from Article 8 of the European Convention on Human Rights into its analysis of the rights of Union citizens. It concluded that the right of a minor child to reside in a Member State under Community law brought with it a corollary right for his mother to reside there as well.

- Test Achats vs Council of Ministers

The legislative organs of the union cannot make laws which allow private sector organisations to discriminate on the grounds of gender even if such discrimination is based on relevant and accurate actuarial and statistical data.

- Minister voor Immigratie en Asiel C-199/12 [2013] 720

== Law of the institutions ==
=== Acts ===
- Mandelli 3/67 [1968] ECR 25

Acts of the European institutions must be supported by sufficient reasoning, the validity of which shall be examined by the Court.

=== Legislative process ===
- Variola 34/73 [1973] ECR 981
- Roquette Frères v Council 138/79 [1980] ECR 3333
- Germany v Commission 24/62 [1963] ECR 131
- Tariff Preferences case 45/86 [1987] ECR 1493
- Beus 5/67 [1968] ECR 83
- Tobacco Advertising case C-376/98 [2000] ECR I-8419
- Opinion 2/94 [1996] ECR I-1759: The European Community did not have the power under the treaties to accede to the European Convention on Human Rights: see Opinion 2/13.
- Inuit Tapiriit Kanatami v Parliament and Council [2013] C-583/11: a 'legislative act' is defined by the procedure used to adopt it.
- Parliament v Council C-65/93 [1995] ECR I-643

=== Liability ===
- Plaumann v Commission 25/62 [1963] ECR 199

The Plaumann test sets out the criteria for non-privileged applicants to prove individual concern: 'Applicants must show that the decision affects them by reason of certain attributes which are peculiar to them or by reason of circumstances in which they are differentiated from all other persons and by virtue of these factors distinguishes them individually just as in the case of the person addressed.'

- Codorníu v Council C-309/89 [1994] ECR I-1853

In this case the court took a more liberal approach than the restrictive Plaumann test for establishing individual concern, which was, however, not followed in judgements thereafter.

=== Access to documents ===
- Stevi and The New York Times v Commission, T-36/23

Where access to Commission documents has been requested by a third party, the Commission cannot claim that it does not hold the requested documents without also providing "credible explanations" to enable the public and the Court "to understand why those documents cannot be located".

=== Interim orders ===
Article 186 of the Treaty of Rome stated that the Court "may, in any cases referred to it, make any necessary interim order". Article 39 of the Treaty of Nice's Protocol on the Statute of the Court of Justice (2001) states that "the President of the Court may, by way of summary procedure ... prescribe interim measures in pursuance of Article 243 of the EC Treaty or Article 158 of the EAEC Treaty".

In Commission of the European Communities v Kingdom of Belgium (1994), the president dismissed an application for interim measures submitted by the commission on 11 March 1994 because the commission had "not displayed the diligence to be expected". The commission had been aware of an alleged breach of the procurement directives in October 1993, and had referred on 8 February 1994 to its "intention" to seek the suspension of a public supplies contract, but did not apply for an interim order until 11 March 1994.

== Competition ==
Leading cases on competition law include Consten & Grundig v Commission and United Brands v Commission.

- Case C-185/95: Baustahlgewebe v. Commission. In 1989 the European Commission had adopted a determination that 14 producers of welded steel mesh had engaged in unlawful restrictions of competition. German company Baustahlgewebe GmbH appealed the decision on 20 October 1989 and the Court of First Instance did not rule on the case until 6 April 1995, five years and six months later. The Court of Justice held that the case had not been determined within a reasonable time and reduced the ECU 3 million fine by ECU 50,000 (a reduction of 1.67%).
- Case C-231/03: Coname v Comune di Cingia de' Botti in Italy (competition and free movement of persons). The court established that transparency obligations apply to the award of a concession for the management of the public gas distribution service.
- Case C-501/06 P: GlaxoSmithKline Services and Others v Commission and Others, joined with cases C-513/06 P, C-515/06 P and C‑519/06 P: four appeals brought under Article 56 of the Statute of the Court of Justice, 2006, regarding Article 81 of the Treaty of Rome.
- Prezes Urzędu Ochrony Konkurencji i Konsumentów v Tele2 Polska sp. z o.o. (now Netia SA): the Polish national competition authority determined that Telekomunikacja Polska SA was not abusing a dominant position on the market. The ECJ ruled that only the European Commission has competence to make such a decision.
- Simba Toys T-450/09 [2014] 983
- C-68/12 - Slovenská sporiteľňa et al. - three banks colluded against a non-banking financial institution which was alleged to be operating illegally in the Slovak Republic. The court ruled that the allegation of illegal operation was irrelevant to determining whether the banks' collusion interfered with the structure of the market and in particular with the interests of competition itself.
- C-230/16 - Coty Germany GmbH v Parfümerie Akzente GmbH - a supplier of luxury goods is able to prevent its authorised distributors from selling them on a third-party internet platform.
- Judgments were issued collectively on 1 February 2018 in four cases concerning anti-competitive behaviour and concerted practices in the international air freight forwarding services market:
  - Case C-261/16: P Kuhne + Nagel International and others v European Commission, regarding a cartel agreeing surcharges on export declarations, referred to as the "new export system" cartel
  - Case C-263/16: P Schenker v Commission
  - Case C-264/16: P Deutsche Bahn and others v Commission
  - Case C-271/16: P Panalpina World Transport (Holding) and others v Commission

The last three cartels referred to above were those known as the "advanced manifest system" cartel, the "peak season surcharge" cartel and the "currency adjustment factor" cartel.

== Computer programs ==
- Case C-128/11: UsedSoft GmbH v Oracle International Corporation, on the resale of "used" computer licences: see UsedSoft#ECJ ruling.

== Consumer protection ==
- Three cases which impact on the national courts' approach to considering fairness in consumer contracts are:
  - Case C-168/05 Mostaza Claro ECR I-10421 - this ruling requires national courts to assess of their own motion whether a contractual term is unfair, due to "the nature and importance of the public interest underlying the protection which [the directive under consideration] confers on consumers".
  - Case C-243/08 Pannon GSM Zrt. v Erzsébet Sustikné Győrfi, ECR I-4713 - the courts are required to examine the unfairness of a contractual term "where [they] have available ... the legal and factual elements necessary for that task". The UK Government interprets the ruling as meaning that "the courts would not have to look at the fairness of the term if they do not have adequate information to do so". On concluding its examination of such a term, "where [the court] considers such a term to be unfair, it must not apply it, except if the consumer opposes that non-application".
  - Case C-137/08 VB Penzugyi v Schneider - the courts would only have to look at the term or terms in question, not the entire contract.
- Case C-489/07 Pia Messner v Firma Stefan Krüger - this preliminary ruling stated that must be EU law "must be interpreted as precluding a provision of national law (in this case, Paragraph 346(1) to (3) of the German Civil Code) which provides in general that, in the case of withdrawal by a consumer within the withdrawal period, a seller may claim compensation for the value of the use of the consumer goods acquired under a distance contract".
- In case C-92/11, RWE Vertrieb AG v Verbraucherzentrale Nordrhein-Westfalen, the court ruled that the use of standard terms in a consumer gas supply contract which reflected the provisions of national legislation could not be excluded from possible review for unfairness if they were used in a contract with a category of consumers who were different from the category of consumer to whom the terms in the national legislation applied. This was because there was an assumption that the national legislature took a balanced view as to the rights and obligations of all parties when drafting the legislation for the first category of consumers, but this assumption could not be upheld in relation to other categories.
- Case C-435/11 CHS Tour Services GmbH v Team4 Travel GmbH: a commercial statement to consumers issued in good faith but objectively incorrect due to a third party's non-compliance is automatically an unfair commercial practice and contrary to the Unfair Commercial Practices Directive 2005.

== Contractual obligations ==
- Case C-133/08 Intercontainer Interfrigo SC v Balkenende Oosthuizen BV and MIC Operations BV, interpreting the European Convention on the Law Applicable to Contractual Obligations of 1980, stated that the "most closely connected" criteria which apply to contracts for the carriage of goods, where an applicable law had not been chosen by the parties, would not apply in relation to a contract making a means of transport available for the carriage of goods.

== Data protection ==
- Case C-362/14 – Maximillian Schrems v Data Protection Commissioner, reference for a preliminary ruling from the High Court of Ireland made on 25 July 2014, published 6 October 2015.
- Case C-582/14 - Patrick Breyer v Bundesrepublik Deutschland, reference for a preliminary ruling from the German Federal Court of Justice, determined on 19 October 2016 that internet users' IP addresses can be personal data within the meaning of Directive 95/46/EC of the European Parliament and of the Council of 24 October 1995 on the protection of individuals with regard to the processing of personal data and on the free movement of such data, but noted also that the operator of a website "may have a legitimate interest in storing certain personal data relating to visitors to that website in order to protect itself against cyberattacks".

== Employment ==
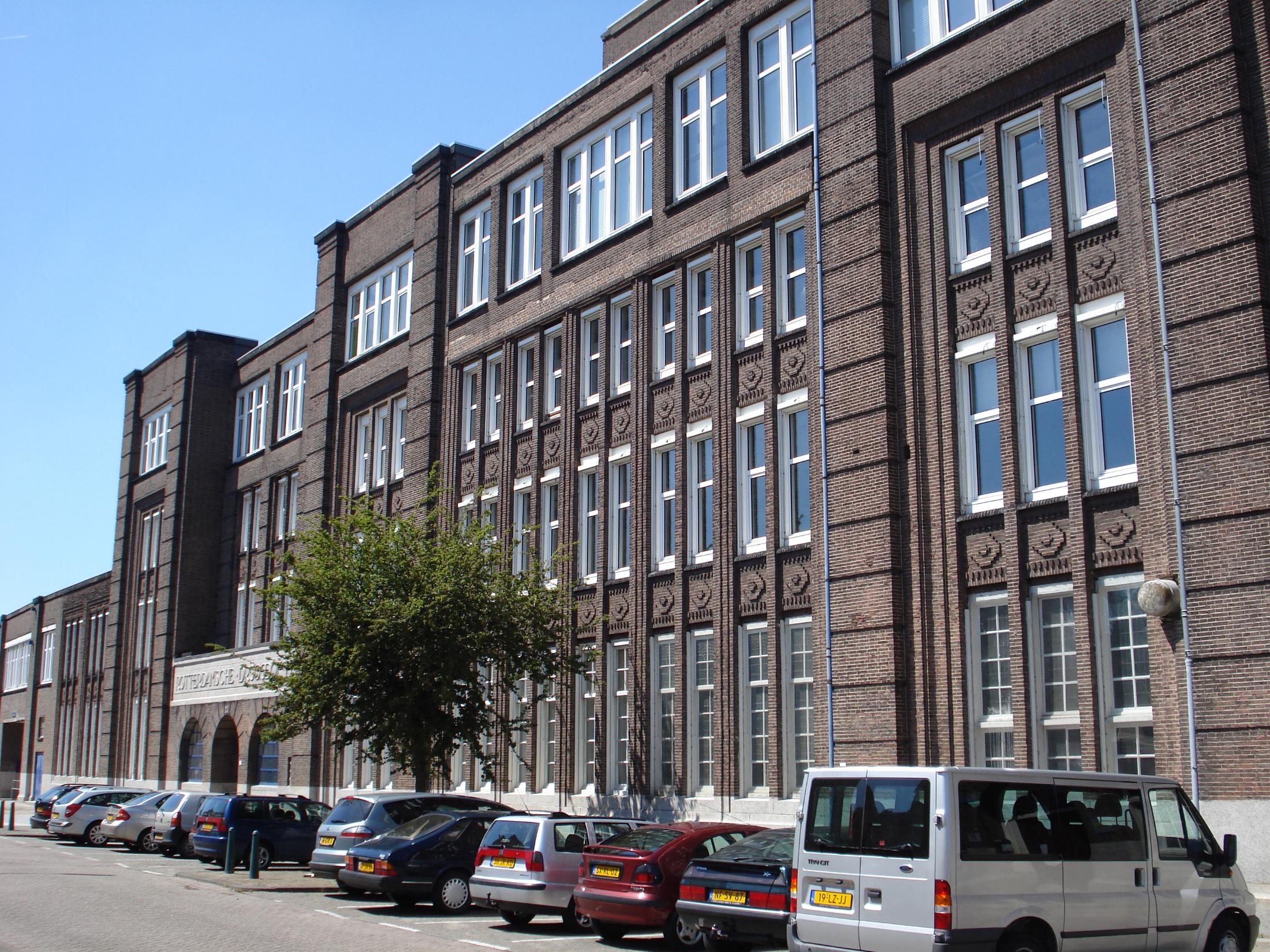
Office of the Rotterdamsche Droogdok Maatschappij shipbuilding company

- Case C-186/83: Arie Botzen and others v Rotterdamsche Droogdok Maatschappij BV, leading case on the meaning of "assignment" in relation to the part of an undertaking or business to which [employees] are "assigned" to carry out [their] duties for purposes of the TUPE directive.
- Case C-24/85: Spijkers v Gebroeders Benedik Abattoir CV

== Environmental information ==
- Case C-240/09: Lesoochranárske zoskupenie VLK v Ministerstvo životného prostredia Slovenskej republiky: whether the Aarhus Convention has direct legal effect within the Member States of the EU. In the absence of EU rules governing this matter, it is for the domestic court of the member state concerned to determine the rules and procedures which apply. Decided on 8 March 2011.
- Case C-279/12: Fish Legal, Emily Shirley v Information Commissioner, United Utilities Water plc, Yorkshire Water Services Ltd, and Southern Water Services Ltd, ruled that the UK's privatised water companies provide "public services relating to the environment" under the control of a public body and therefore should be treated as "public bodies" for the purposes of all the environmental information they hold. Their obligation to provide environmental information to the public is limited to information related to the public services which they provide in the environmental field.

== External relations ==
- Commission v Council relating to the European Road Transport Agreement (ERTA), [1971] ECR 263

== External trade ==
- Portugal v Council, case C-149/96: application made by the government of Portugal for the annulment of Council Decision 96/386/EC of 26 February 1996 concerning the conclusion of Memoranda of Understanding between the European Community and the Islamic Republic of Pakistan (signed 31 December 1994) and between the European Community and the Republic of India (signed 15 October 1994) on arrangements in the area of market access for textile products. Among other concerns, the Portuguese government argued that the principle of transparency had been breached, because the contested decision approved Memoranda of Understanding which were "not adequately structured and are drafted in obscure terms which prevent a normal reader from immediately grasping all their implications, in particular as regards their retroactive application". In support of this plea, Portugal relied on a European Council resolution of 8 June 1993 on the quality of drafting of Community legislation. In this respect, the Court ruled that the 1993 resolution had no binding effect and that in any case, "the decision appears to be clear in every aspect".

== Intellectual property rights ==
- Case C-251/95 Sabel v Puma, concerned the likelihood of confusion and the difference with the likelihood of association in trade mark law.
- Case C-408/01 Adidas-Salomon AG and Adidas Benelux v. Fitnessworld Trading Ltd. - reference for a preliminary ruling from the Supreme Court of the Netherlands concerning trade marks with a reputation.
- Case C-321/03 Dyson v Registrar of Trade Marks, where the court clarified the concept of a sign of which a trade mark may consist.
- Case C-252/07 Intel Corporation v. CPM United Kingdom Ltd. - the court interpreted the meaning of Article 4 (4)(a) of the Trade Marks Directive.
- Joined cases C-446/09 and C-495/09 concerned the interpretation of EU legislation governing action by customs authorities against possible infringements of intellectual property rights when suspected goods were within the EU for "external transit" purposes.
- In SAS Institute Inc v World Programming Ltd. (C-406/10), the court ruled that copyright protection does not extend to software functionality, the programming language used, or the format of the data files used by a software program.

== Internal market ==
=== Free movement of goods ===
==== Definition of "goods" ====
- Commission v Italy ("Italian Art") 7/68 [1968] ECR 423

'Goods' are "products which can be valued in money and which are capable, as such, of forming the subject of commercial transactions".

- Commission v Belgium C-2/90 [1992] ECR I-4431

"Waste, whether recyclable or not, is to be regarded as 'goods'."

==== Customs duties and equivalent charges ====
Articles 23 and 25 EC prohibit as between Member States all "customs duties on imports and exports and of all charges having equivalent effect". The prohibition in Article 25 also applies to customs duties of a fiscal nature.

- Commission v Italy ('Italian statistical data') 24/68 [1969] ECR 193

Customs charges are prohibited because "any pecuniary charge, however small, imposed on goods by reason of the fact that they cross a frontier constitutes an obstacle to the movement of such goods."

- Diamantarbeiders 2/69 and 3/69 [1969] ECR 211

A charge having equivalent effect to a customs duty is "any pecuniary charge however small and whatever its designation and mode of application which is imposed unilaterally on domestic or foreign goods by reason of the fact that they cross a frontier and which is not a customs duty in the strict sense." This is the case "even if it is not imposed for the benefit of the State [and] is not discriminatory or protective in effect, or if the product on which the charge is imposed is not in competition with any domestic product."

- Bresciani 87/75 [1976] ECR 129

Charges imposed for a public health inspection carried out on the entry of goods to a Member State can be a charge having equivalent effect to a customs duty. It was not important that the charges were proportionate to the costs of the inspection, nor that such inspections were in the public interest.

- Commission v Germany 18/87 [1988] ECR 5427

A charge for a service will not be regarded as a customs duty where it: (a) does not exceed the cost of the service, (b) that service is obligatory and applied uniformly for all the goods concerned, (c) the service fulfills obligations prescribed by Community law, and (d) the service promotes the free movement of goods in particular by neutralising obstacles which may arise from unilateral measures of inspection.

==== Indirect taxation ====
Article 110 EC prevents any Member State from imposing, "directly or indirectly, on the products of other Member States any internal taxation of any kind in excess of that imposed directly or indirectly on similar domestic products". This prohibition also extends to "internal taxation of such a nature as to afford indirect protection to other products".

- Humblot 112/84 [1985] ECR 1367

==== Quantitative restrictions ====
Article 34 EC bans "quantitative restrictions on imports and all measures having equivalent effect shall be prohibited between Member States", the same provision in respect of exports is found in Article 35 EC.

- Geddo v Ente 2/73 [1973] ECR 865

Quantitative restrictions are "measures which amount to a total or partial restraint of, according to the circumstances, imports, exports or goods in transit."

===== Measures having Equivalent effect to a Quantitative Restriction (MEQRs) =====
- Procureur du Roi v Dassonville 8/74 [1974] ECR 837

The following are prohibited as Measures having Equivalent effect to a Quantitative Restriction (MEQRs): "all trading rules enacted by Member States which are capable of hindering, directly or indirectly, actually or potentially, intra-Community trade."

- Commission v Ireland 249/81 [1982] ECR 4005
- Commission v UK 207/83 [1985] ECR 1201

===== Justification =====
Article 36 EC exempts quantitative restrictions which are justified on grounds of "public morality, public policy or public security; the protection of health and life of humans, animals or plants; the protection of national treasures possessing artistic, historic or archaeological value; or the protection of industrial and commercial property". The restrictions must not, in any case, "constitute a means of arbitrary discrimination or a disguised restriction on trade between Member States".

- Cassis de Dijon 120/78 [1979] ECR 649
- Henn and Darby 34/79 [1979] ECR 3795
- Keck and Mithouard C-267/91 and C-268/91 [1993] ECR I-6097
- Torfaen Borough Council C-145/88 [1989] ECR 3851

==== Commission v Austria cases ====
Cases C-320/03 and C-28/09 found that rules prohibiting use of part of the A12 Autobahn by lorries of over 7.5 tonnes carrying certain goods were an unjustified restriction of the free movement of goods, even though the relevant Austrian laws were a response to the EU directives on air quality.

==== Product liability ====
The Product Liability Directive aims to ensure undistorted competition between economic operators, to facilitate the free movement of goods and to avoid differences in levels of consumer protection.

- Case-495/10 - Centre hospitalier universitaire de Besançon v Thomas Dutrueux, Caisse primaire d'assurance maladie du Jura, 21 December 2011: The directive is not intended "exhaustively to harmonise the sphere of liability for defective products beyond its own area of application", which concerns producer and importer liability for defective products. A French healthcare law which also imposes a form of no-fault liability on public hospitals is therefore not incompatible with the directive.

=== Free movement of persons ===
==== Workers ====
- Hoekstra 75/63 [1964] ECR 347
- Sotgiu 152/73 [1974] ECR 153
- Van Duyn 41/74 [1974] ECR 1337
- Levin 53/81 [1982] ECR 1035
- Lawrie-Blum 66/85 [1986] ECR 2121
- Union nationale des entraîneurs et cadres techniques professionnels du football (Unectef) v Georges Heylens and others, C-222/86, judgment dated 15 October 1987, ruled that it must be possible for a worker to challenge a refusal to recognise the equivalence of a diploma. George Heylens in this case was a Belgian footballer. French rules at the time required a football trainer working in France to have a French qualification.
- Bettray 344/87 [1989] ECR 1621
- Groener C-379/87 [1989] ECR 3967
- Antonissen C-292/89 [1991] ECR I-745
- Bosman C-415/93[1995] ECR I-4921
- Angonese C-281/98 [2000] ECR I-4139
- Trojani C-456/02 [2004] ECR I-07573

==== Citizenship ====
- Grzelczyk C-184/99 [2001] ECR I-6193
- Garcia Avello C-148/02 [2003] ECR I-11613
- Collins C-138/02 [2004] ECR I-2703
- Zhu and Chen C-200/02 [2004] ECR I-9925
- Metock and Others C-127/08 [2008] ECR I-6241
- Libert et al v Gouvernement flamand (Flemish Government), Case C-197/11, found that a decree of the Flemish Region dated 27 March 2009 on land and real estate, which restricted transfer of certain land to persons with a "sufficient connection" with the local community, breached the Citizens' Rights Directive, 2004/38/EC. The case was joined with case C-203/11.

=== Freedom of establishment and to provide services ===
==== Establishment ====
- Reyners 2/74 [1974] ECR 631
- Thieffry 71/76 [1977] ECR 765
- Factortame II C-221/89 [1991] ECR I-3905
- Vlassopoulou 340/89 [1991] ECR 2357
- Centros C-212/97 [1999] ECR I-1459
- Überseering C-208/00 [2002] ECR I-9919
- Joined cases C-186/11 and C-209/11 Stanleybet et al. v. Organismos prognostikon agonon podosfairou AE (OPAP) regarding OPAP's monopoly betting licence under Greek national law.

==== Services ====
- van Binsbergen 33/74 [1974] ECR 1299
- Cowan 186/87 [1989] ECR 195
- Rush Portuguesa C-113/89 [1990] ECR I-1417
- Gebhard C-55/94 [1995] ECR I-4165
- Bosman C-415/93[1995] ECR I-4921
- Case C-393/05, Commission v Austria, concerning the Austrian requirement that every inspection body in the field of organic agriculture with a registered office outside Austria must also maintain an office inside Austria. The Court held that this requirement was a disproportionate restriction on freedom to provide services.
- Case C-434/15, Asociación Profesional Elite Taxi v Uber Systems Spain SL: the service provided by Uber connecting individuals with vehicle drivers is to be classified as a service in the field of transport.

=== Non-application of single market principles ===
- Case C-108/98 - RI.SAN. v Comune di Ischia, Italia Lavoro SpA, formerly GEPI SpA and Ischia Ambiente SpA: the treaty principles relating to freedom of movement, freedom of establishment and freedom to provide services were not engaged by the facts of the case, because the facts were "confined to a single Member State". RI.SAN. Srl had challenged the decision of the comune to appoint a mixed-capital limited company to provide its waste management services, but as RI.SAN. was an Italian organisation it was not relying on the freedoms to operate across Member State boundaries which were provided for by the EC Treaty.

== Investment ==
- Case C-284/16 - Slowakische Republik v Achmea BV: in 2018, the court ruled that the arbitration clause in the 1991 agreement between The Netherlands and Slovakia (formerly the Czech and Slovak Federative Republic) on the protection of investments was "not compatible with EU law".

== Jurisdiction and the recognition and enforcement of judgments ==
- Allianz SpA v West Tankers, case C-185/07, concerned Regulation 44/2001 on the recognition and enforcement of foreign arbitral awards. Anti-suit injunctions restraining a party from commencing or continuing processes in the court of a Brussels Regulation member state cannot be granted in the court of another member state because this would be incompatible with the regulation.
- Marco Gambazzi v DaimlerChrysler Canada Inc. and CIBC Mellon Trust Company, case C–394/07, concerned implementation of the public policy clause of the Brussels Convention (now the Brussels I Regulation). In this case, the court ruled that the Italian courts (and potentially other courts of member states) could decline to enforce a default judgment entered against Mr Gambazzi in the UK courts if, following a "comprehensive assessment of the proceedings", the court considered that the default judgment in the absence of the defendant "constituted a manifest and disproportionate infringement of [his] right to be heard".
- Car Trim GmbH v KeySafety Systems SrL (case C-381/08) and Electrosteel Europe sa v Edil Centro SpA, (case C-87/10): two linked cases regarding the place of "performance" of a contractual obligation, which may be used to determine the national court with jurisdiction in a civil or commercial matter. This will in general be the place of delivery in relation to a contract for the sale of goods. These cases looked at situations where goods were made available for delivery to a purchaser in another member state. The terms of the contract should first be considered to determine where "delivery" is to take place, but if this is not possible (not knowing which member state's substantive contract law is to apply), the place where goods are physically handed over to the purchaser or their agent will determine the place of performance.
- Pammer v. Karl Schlütter GmbH & Co. KG (case C-585/08) and Hotel Alpenhof v. Mr. Heller (case C-144/09), 2010: see Pammer and Alpenhof cases

== Police and judicial cooperation in criminal matters ==
- Case C-396/11 - Ciprian Vasile Radu, regarding Council Framework Decision 2002/584/JHA of 13 June 2002 on the European arrest warrant and the surrender procedures between Member States.

== Procurement ==
=== Procurement procedures of entities operating in the water, energy, transport and postal services sectors ===
- Case C-513/99 - Concordia Bus Finland Oy Ab, formerly Stagecoach Finland Oy Ab v Helsingin kaupunki and HKL-Bussiliikenne, also a public procurement ruling, delivered 17 September 2002. The City of Helsinki began progressively tendering for the operation of bus services across the whole city network in 1997. Concordia Bus Finland challenged the inclusion of environmental factors in the evaluation criteria. One of the objections of Concordia Bus was that the criteria were discriminatory because the Community’s own bus company HKL was the only company with gas-powered vehicles that could comply with the emission levels set. The court ruled that the fact that one of a set of various award criteria imposed by the contracting authority could only be met by a small number of companies did not in itself make this discriminatory.
- Case C-394-02: Commission of the European Communities v Hellenic Republic. Circumstances following an environmental impact assessment with a deadline for implementation did not qualify as "extreme urgency" for the purposes of justifying a negotiated contract being agreed without advertising an opportunity for other companies to express interest. See Public Power Corporation#Legal issues.
- Case C-331/04: ATI EAC and Others v ACTV Venezia SpA and others: see below in the public procurement section
- Joined Cases C-21/03 and C-34/03: Fabricom SA v État belge: a case regarding participation in a tender exercise by an organisation which has contributed to the development of the works, supplies or services concerned. An organisation in this position must be "given the opportunity to prove that, in the circumstances of the case, the experience which he has acquired was not capable of distorting competition".
- Case C-206/08: Wasser- und Abwasserzweckverband Gotha und Landkreisgemeinden (WAZV Gotha) v Eurawasser Aufbereitungs- und Entsorgungsgesellschaft mbH. Ruled in relation to a contract for the supply of services, that "the fact that the supplier does not receive consideration directly from the contracting authority, but is entitled to collect payment under private law from third parties, is sufficient for the contract in question to be categorised as a 'service concession' within the meaning of Article 1(3)(b) of Directive 2004/17/EC of the European Parliament and of the council of 31 March 2004".

=== Public procurement ===
- Case 31/87 Gebroeders Beentjes BV v State of the Netherlands on the interpretation of Council Directive 71/305/EEC of 26 July 1971 concerning the coordination of procedures for the award of public works contracts: a "social consideration" such as a condition relating to the employment of long-term unemployed persons is compatible with the public works directive if it has no direct or indirect discriminatory effect on tenderers from other Member States of the Community. In his opinion as an Advocate-General in this case, Marco Darmon also advised that the distinction between checking a tenderer's suitability for a specific contract and the contract award decision based on the bid evaluation criteria does not require these two steps to be assessed in sequence, and where an awarding authority "belatedly" becomes aware of a tenderer's unsuitability, it should be able to rely on that information "up to the last moment".
- Case C-243/89 Commission v Denmark - construction contract for the Storebaelt bridge: a condition requiring use of local labour and local materials was held to be incompatible with treaty principles.
- Case C-107/92 Commission v Italian Republic – an urgent need had arisen to construct an avalanche barrier in the Alpe Gallina region near Colle Isarco and Brenner in the South Tyrol, following publication of a geological report in June 1988 recommending in advance of the 1988-89 winter. The Italian government appointed a contractor without advertising in the Official Journal of the European Communities on the grounds of urgency, but the European Commission argued, and the Court agreed, that there was sufficient time to advertise the works opportunity under the accelerated procedure as defined in section 15 of the Directive on Public Works Contracts (Directive 71/305/EEC).
- Case C-331/92 Gestión Hotelera Internacional SA v Comunidad Autónoma de Canarias, Ayuntamiento de Las Palmas de Gran Canaria and Gran Casino de Las Palmas SA: the contract in question covered the assignment of publicly-owned land to a casino concession with incidental works to be undertaken in order to operate the casino. The court held that, because the works were "merely incidental" to the concession, the provisions of Directive 71/305 did not apply to the contract award procedure.
- Case C-97/94 Commission v Belgium: contracting authorities have "a degree of choice" as to which procurement procedure they follow for each procurement exercise, but "once they have issued an invitation to tender under one particular procedure, they are required to observe the rules applicable to it until the contract has been finally awarded". In this case, brought by the Commission of the European Communities against the Kingdom of Belgium, the Belgian government argued that although this tender for the supply of buses for public transport in Wallonia had been issued using the "Open Procedure", the "negotiated procedure" could have been used instead. The court stated that subsequently changing the procedure in order to negotiate (or accept further post-tender information) was not permitted.
- Case C-225/98 Commission v French Republic – ruled that the Nord-Pas-de-Calais region and the Département du Nord had failed to fulfil their legal obligations through the use of employment criteria in the technical specification used when contracting for the construction and maintenance of school buildings. However, the court ruled that where a contracting authority had to assess two or more economically equivalent bids, they could adopt employment opportunities as an "accessory" or "additional" criterion, as long as the use of this criterion was not discriminatory.
- Case C-237/99 Commission v French Republic – ruled that the French public housing institutions, offices publics d'aménagement et de construction (OPAC, public development and construction entities) and societes anonymes habitations à loyer modéré (SA HTMs, low-rent housing corporations) met the criteria in the then-applicable public works contracts directive (Council Directive 93/37/EEC) for being treated as a "body governed by public law" according to article 1(b) of the directive:

- a body established for the specific purpose of meeting needs in the general interest, not having an industrial or commercial character,
- having legal personality, and

[either]
- financed, for the most part, by the State, or regional or local authorities, or other bodies governed by public law, or
- subject to management supervision by those bodies, or
- having an administrative, managerial or supervisory board, more than half of whose members are appointed by the State, regional or local authorities or by other bodies governed by public law. Accordingly they were subject to the obligation to publish relevant above-threshold contracts in the Official Journal of the European Communities.

- Case C-470/99 Universale-Bau AG established that a contracting authority must disclose not just the selection criteria it intends to use in the award of a public contract, but also the weighting that it intends to apply in respect of those criteria. The ruling also established that the EU's procurement legislation does not preclude national rules invoking a time limit during which an application for review of a contracting authority's decision must be commenced, so long as the time limit is "reasonable".
- Case C-19/00 SIAC Construction Ltd. v The County Council of the County of Mayo - the court ruled on the interpretation of Article 29 of Council Directive 71/305/EEC of 26 July 1971: see SIAC Construction Ltd v The County Council of the County of Mayo#Court of Justice of the European Union
- Case C-488/01 Wienstrom case: the court ruled that in a tender for energy supply, a criterion relating solely to the amount of electricity produced from renewable sources in excess of the expected consumption of the contracting authority (which was the subject of the contract) could not be considered to be linked to the subject-matter of the contract. To establish such a link to the subject-matter of the contract, the criterion relating to the amount of electricity produced from renewable sources should have concerned only the electricity effectively supplied to the contracting authority, namely the Austrian federal government, in respect of its offices in the Land of Carinthia.
- Case C-327/00 Santex SpA v Unita Socio Sanitaria Locale n. 42 di Pavia: Unita Socio Sanitaria Locale n.42 di Pavia in Italy tendered for home-delivery of incontinence products for their service users. A requirement in the invitation to tender (ITT) referring to tenderers' turnover over the preceding three years was challenged by a bidder, Santex SpA, and so the public body stated that the requirement would not effect eligibility to tender but would be considered in tender evaluation. Tender evaluation was postponed while additional information was requested from bidders, but ultimately the public body decided to enforce the requirement in the ITT and exclude certain bidders, including Santex, from evaluation. Santex sought to enforce its original challenge in court but as it was now more than 60 days from the publication of the ITT it was ruled out of time. The Court stated that the principle of effectiveness required the national court to override the 60 day limitation period and allow Santex's challenge to be heard.
- Case C-211/02 Tideland Signal Ltd v European Commission: supply case where the Commission rejected a tender in circumstances where the Court of First Instance held that a clarification should have been sought instead of the tender being rejected, giving rise to a proposition on the circumstances where a clarification should be sought, subsequently referred to as the "Tideland principles".
- C-15/04 Koppensteiner: an authority's decision to withdraw an invitation to tender must be open to review.
- Joined cases C-226/04 and C-228/04: whether companies bidding for public service contracts who have failed to pay tax or social security contributions on time but have subsequently regularised their position may be included within a procurement procedure, where national harmonising legislation makes provision for such companies not to be considered.
- Case C-331/04 ATI EAC and Others v ACTV Venezia SpA and others, a public service contracts and transport procurement case, allowed that specific weightings may be applied to the subheadings of an award criterion which are defined in advance, even though the weightings were not determined at the time when the contract notice was issued, so long as the criteria themselves are not amended, the weightings do not contain elements which, if they had been known at the time the tenders were prepared, could have affected their preparation, and they do not give rise to any discrimination between the tenderers.
- Case T-70/05 European Dynamics v European Maritime Safety Agency (EMSA): European Dynamics challenged two contract awards by EMSA, one successfully and one unsuccessfully. On one tender, European Dynamics was successful because EMSA had wrongly accepted a tender which had been received after the tender deadline and which was not covered by a "registered post" exception provided for in the tender documents. On the other tender, the General Court upheld the decision-making in Case C-331/04 (ATI) and ruled in favour of EMSA, noting additionally that "where an applicant challenges the weighting applied to sub-criteria, there must be an evidential base for any contention that there has been a failure to satisfy any of the three ATI conditions".
- Case C-444/06 Commission v Spain: the Spanish public procurement rules did not adequately transpose the requirements of Council Directive 89/665/EEC on the coordination of the laws, regulations and administrative provisions relating to the application of review procedures to the award of public supply and public works contracts, as amended by Council Directive 92/50/EEC of 18 June 1992. However, in regard to some provisions in Spanish law intended to preserve the effects of a contract subject to an administrative declaration of invalidity and to maintain continuity of public service provision, the Court found that the commission had not demonstrated that the legislation undermined the requirements of the review directive.
- Case C‑450/06 Varec SA v Belgian State, 14 February 2008: a review body must ensure that confidentiality and business secrecy are respected. The review body itself is responsible for determining how this can best be done whilst also providing effective legal protection and respecting the rights of the parties to the dispute under review to conduct their defence.
- Case C-454/06 pressetext Nachrichtenagentur GmbH v Republic of Austria, on amendments to the Austrian government's contract with the Austria Press Agency (APA), and the question of material amendments to a contract.
- Case C-532/06 Emm G Lianakis AE and others v Dimos Alexandrouplis and others, states that the "selection" and "award" stages of a procurement process are distinct processes with different purposes and should not be fused into one. The case establishes that a supplier's "experience" may be used as a selection criterion but cannot function as a evaluation criterion at the "award" stage.
- Case T-258/06 Commission v Germany, a case in the General Court of the European Union: Germany unsuccessfully challenged the lawfulness of the Commission's Interpretative Communication on the Community law applicable to contract awards not or not fully subject to the provisions of the Public Procurement Directives, published in August 2006.
- Case C‑538/07 Assitur Srl v Camera di Commercio, Industria, Artigianato e Agricoltura di Milano: addressed a referral from the Italian Tribunale Amministrativo Regionale per la Lombardia for advice on whether the list of criteria in the (old) procurement directive 92/50/EEC for excluding tenderers from a procurement process was to be treated as exhaustive. The ruling confirmed that in itself the list was not exhaustive, but parallel Italian legislation according to which "undertakings linked by a relationship of control or affiliated to one another" were not permitted to take part simultaneously in the same procurement procedure" was unlawful unless the businesses involved were given "an opportunity to demonstrate that [their] relationship did not influence their conduct in the course of that tendering procedure".
- Case C-406/08, Uniplex (UK) Ltd. v NHS Business Services Authority: reviewed the provision in the UK's Public Contracts Regulations obliging an unsuccessful tenderer to submit a challenge to the contracting authority's decision "promptly, and in any event within three months". The court concluded that this national provision was contrary to EU law because this form of wording prevented claimants from knowing the exact time limit which would apply.
- Case C-456/08 Commission v Ireland: Order 84A of the Rules of the Superior Courts in Ireland required procurement review actions to be brought "at the earliest opportunity and in any event within three months". The Court ruled that this wording left disappointed bidders "in uncertainty regarding their position when they consider making use of their Community law right to effective legal remedy against a decision of a contracting authority". A new Order 84A was issued by the Irish Government on 8 September 2010 which is now consistent with EU law. This requires that actions be brought within 30 calendar days of when the claimant "knew or ought to have known" of the alleged infringement".
- Case C-599/10 SAG ELV Slovensko a.s. and others v Úrad pre verejné obstarávanie, referral from the Najvyšší súd Slovenskej republiky (Supreme Court of the Slovak Republic). In a case where a tender is imprecise or does not meet the technical requirements of the specification, there is no obligation to consult the tenderer or to ask for a clarification, and to do so would conflict with the principle of equal treatment of tenderers. There is a duty to request clarification of an abnormally low price and in this case the contracting authority "must set out clearly its request for clarification".
- Case C-159/11 Azienda Sanitaria Locale di Lecce and Universita del Salento v Ordine degli Ingegneri della Provincia di Lecce and others, referral from the Italian Consiglio di Stato. The Azienda sanitaria locale (public hospital authority) in Lecce appointed the University of Salento to undertake a seismic vulnerability study of its hospital buildings in accordance with Italian Law 241 of 7 August 1990, which authorised public administrative authorities to enter into agreements on cooperation in activities of common interest, and in accordance with Italian university reforms effective from 1980. The Court ruled that public procurement law precluded national legislation which authorised the conclusion of public authority cooperation agreements without tendering. An exception would be where all the cooperating authorities had to perform the same public task.
- Case C-182/11 Econord SpA v Comune di Cagno et al., 29 November 2012: control "similar to the control which [a local authority] exercises over its own departments" is maintained where the authority holds capital in a public entity and also plays "a role in its managing bodies". Joined case with case C-183/11.
- Case 94/12: Swm Contruzioni 2 SpA and Mannochi Luigino DI v. Provincia di Fermo ruled that Italian public works contracting rules which prevented a tenderer from relying on the capacities of more than one other business in each category covered by the business qualification system was inconsistent with the rules in the public procurement directive of 2004 allowing "entities" (plural), as a general rule, to be engaged in supporting the delivery of a contract or evidencing that the necessary capacity was available to the tendering organisation.
- Case C-552/13: Grupo Hospitalario Quirón SA v Departamento de Sanidad del Gobierno Vasco and Instituto de Religiosas Siervas de Jesús de la Caridad, confirmed that the 2004 Directive on Public Procurement did not permit a tender for medical services to state as a requirement that the proposed services must be provided within the boundaries of a particular locality, in this case the municipality of Bilbao. A more general proximity requirement in the specification, more easily justifiable, was not criticised by the court.
- Case T-4/13: Communicaid Group Ltd. v European Commission, another EU General Court case. Communicaid, a London-based language-training company challenged a procurement award decision made by the Commission and requested that the proposed contract award be suspended. The challenge was dismissed as Communicaid had failed to establish why urgent measures were required.
- Joined cases C-439/14 and C-488/14, SC Star Storage v Institutul Naţional de Cercetare-Dezvoltare în Informatică (ICI) and SC Max Boegl România SRL et alv RA Aeroportul Oradea et al: two Romanian appeal court cases testing out Romania's requirement for tenderers to pay for a "good conduct guarantee" if they wish to appeal against the decision of a contracting authority. The Court found that, so long as the guarantee funding was to be returned to the tenderer regardless of the outcome of their appeal, the legislation which specified that the "good conduct guarantee" was a requirement was upheld as permissible.
- Case C-549/14: Finn Frogne A/S v Rigspolitiet ved Center for Beredskabskommunikation: the Court of Justice ruled that a settlement agreement in relation to a dispute between a public body and a contractor could in some cases amount to a material amendment to their contract, for which a new tender should have taken place. In this case, which originated in the Danish courts, the settlement agreement reduced the scope of the contract, and the ECJ's view was that other operators might have wanted to take on the reduced-scope provision.
- Case C-413/17: Roche Lietuva, related to the detailed formulation of technical specifications.
- Case C-267/18: Delta Antrepriză de Construcții și Montaj 93 SA ("Delta") v Compania Națională de Administrare a Infrastructurii Rutiere SA. A previous contract entered into by Delta for construction of a leisure facility had been terminated early because of partial unauthorised sub-contracting. The company's subsequent exclusion from a tender for a road-widening project (2017) was held to be justified by the Court as within the powers granted to the authority by article 57(4) of the 2014 directive.

== Social policy ==
- Defrenne III C-149/77 [1978] ECR 1365: the scope of article 119 of the EEC Treaty does not extend beyond equal pay, but the elimination of sex discrimination is a fundamental principle of Community law.
- Bundesdruckerei v. Stadt Dortmund, Case C-549/13: the City of Dortmund could not require tenderers for a document digitalisation contract to commit to paying German minimum wage levels to the workforce when they were intending to sub-contract the performance of the contract to a firm based in Poland outside the scope of the German minimum wage law.
- Vatsouras and Koupatantze v ARGE, (C-22/08 and C-23/08): article 12 EC does not preclude national rules which exclude nationals of Member States of the European Union from receipt of social assistance benefits which are granted to nationals of non-member countries

== State liability ==
- Francovich and Bonifaci C-6/90 and C-9/90 [1991] ECR I-5357
- Brasserie du Pêcheur / Factortame III C-46/93 and C-48/93 [1996] ECR I-1029
- British Telecom C-392/93 [1996] ECR I-1631
- Faccini Dori C-91/92 [1994] ECR I-3325
- Köbler C-224/01 [2003] ECR I-10239
- ClientEarth C-404/13 [2014] 2382
- Elisabeta Dano and Florin Dano C-333/13 [2014] 2358

== Taxation ==
=== Value added tax ===
- C-97/90 – Lennartz v Finanzamt München III: reference for a preliminary ruling on VAT paid on the purchase of capital goods.
- Axel Kittel & Recolta Recycling SPRL (cases C-439/04 and C-440/04, issued 6 July 2006) (known as Kittel), a missing trader fraud case. Under the Kittel ruling, "the right to claim input tax could be denied to anyone in the supply chain if the trader knew or should have known that their transactions were connected with VAT fraud".

=== VAT groups ===
Taxation barrister Philip Simpson refers to "the three main ECJ cases" on VAT groups as:

- Case C-162/07, Ampliscientifica and Amplifin v. Ministero dell’Economia e delle Finanze, (2008, Italy) ECR I-4019: Italy had failed to consult the EU's VAT Committee in accordance with Article 11 of the Sixth VAT Directive
- Case C-7/13 Skandia America Corp (USA) v. Skatteverket (the Swedish Tax Agency), 14 September 2014, affected certain member states who operate a form of "establishment-only" VAT grouping. According to HMRC's summary of this case,
  Skandia America Corporation was a company incorporated in the United States, with a fixed establishment (a branch) in Sweden. The Swedish branch became part of a Swedish VAT group. The Swedish tax authority viewed services provided by Skandia America Corporation to its Swedish branch as taxable transactions. Skandia disagreed on the grounds that these were intra-company transactions and consequently not supplies for VAT purposes, following the decision in FCE Bank (C-210/04). ... The [ECJ] stated that under the Swedish grouping provisions only the branch that was physically located in Sweden could belong to a Swedish VAT group. The [ECJ] ruled that consequently the branch in Sweden became part of single taxable person (the group) different to the taxable person of the US head office. So the provision of IT services by the head office to its branch was a supply between 2 separate taxable persons and so liable to VAT. The Swedish VAT group had to account for VAT on those services under the reverse charge.
- Cases C-108/14 and C-109/14 (conjoined), Larentia + Minerva and Marenave, 16 July 2015.

A separate ruling is Case C-355/06, van der Steen (2007), a case which Simpson refers to as "not terribly clear".

== Transport ==
- Case C-509/11: ÖBB-Personenverkehr AG. Rail passengers’ rights and obligations are protected by Regulation 1371/2007 as well as the Uniform Rules concerning the Contract for International Carriage of Passengers and Luggage by Rail. The regulation provides for passengers to be compensated for delay due to force majeure, even though the Uniform Rules exempt operators from liability for delay caused by force majeure.

== Fifty-seven pre-accession cases ==
The following is the official list of fifty-seven cases that were translated in preparation for new member states who joined the European Union in 2004. The list below contains fifty case names, because some cases were joined.

- NV Algemene Transport- en Expeditie Onderneming van Gend & Loos v Nederlandse administratie der belastingen (1963) Case 26/62
- Plaumann & Co. v Commission (1963) Case 25/62
- Flaminio Costa v E.N.E.L. (1964) Case 6/64
- Établissements Consten S.à.R.L. and Grundig-Verkaufs-GmbH v Commission (1966) Case 56-58/64
- Commission v Council (1971) Case 22/70
- Aktien-Zuckerfabrik Schöppenstedt v Council (1971) Case 5/71
- Jean Reyners v Belgian State (1974) Case 2/74
- Procureur du Roi v Benoît in Gustave Dassonville (1974) Case 8/74
- Yvonne van Duyn v Home Office (1974) Case 41/74
- Gabrielle Defrenne v Société anonyme belge de navigation aérienne Sabena (1976) Case 43/75
- Amministrazione delle Finanze dello Stato v Simmenthal SpA (1978) Case 106/77
- Rewe-Zentral AG v Bundesmonopolverwaltung für Branntwein (1979) Case 120/78
- Liselotte Hauer v Land Rheinland-Pfalz (1979) Case 44/79
- SA Roquette Frères v Council (1980) Case 138/79
- Commission v Belgium (1980) Case 149/79
- Ursula Becker v Finanzamt Münster-Innenstadt (1982) Case 8/81
- France, Italy and United Kingdom v Commission (1982) Cases 188-190/80
- Srl CILFIT et Lanificio di Gavardo SpA v Ministero della sanità (1982) Case 283/81
- Sabine von Colson in Elisabeth Kamann v Land Nordrhein-Westfalen (1984) Case 14/83
- Parti écologiste “Les Verts” v Parliament (1986) Case 294/83
- Marguerite Johnston v Chief Constable of the Royal Ulster Constabulary (1986) Case 222/84
- Commission v Germany (1987) Case 178/84
- Commission v Council (1987) Case 45/86
- Foto-Frost v Hauptzollamt Lübeck-Ost (1987) Case 314/85
- Pascal Van Eycke v Société anonyme ASPA (1988) Case 267/86
- Hoechst AG v Commission (1989) Cases 46/87 and 227/88
- Parliament v Council (1990) Case C-70/88
- R v Secretary of State for Transport, ex parte Factortame Ltd (1990) Case C-213/89
- Zuckerfabrik Süderdithmarschen AG v Hauptzollamt Itzehoe and Zuckerfabrik Soest GmbH v Hauptzollamt Paderborn (1991) C-143/88 in C-92/89
- Andrea Francovich in Danila Bonifaci v Italy (1991) C-6/90 in C-9/90
- Opinion of the Court under article 288 (1991) Opinion 1/91
- Telemarsicabruzzo SpA v Circostel in Ministero delle Poste e Telecomunicazioni in Ministero della Difesa (1993) C-320/90, C-321/90 in C-322/90
- Bernard Keck and Daniel Mithouard (1993) C-267/91 and C-268/91
- Paola Faccini Dori v Recreb Srl (1994) Case C-91/92
- Competence of the Community to conclude international agreements concerning services and the protection of intellectual property (1994) Opinion 1/94
- Alpine Investments BV v Minister van Financiën (1995) Case C-384/93
- Reinhard Gebhard v Consiglio dell'Ordine degli Avvocati e Procuratori di Milano (1995) Case C-55/94
- Union royale belge des sociétés de football association ASBL v Jean-Marc Bosman (1995) Case C-415/93
- Brasserie du Pêcheur SA v Bundesrepublik Deutschland and R v Secretary of State for Transport, ex parte: Factortame Ltd (1996) C-46/93 and C-48/93
- Community accession to the Convention for the Protection of Human Rights and Fundamental Freedoms (1996) Opinion 2/94
- CIA Security International SA v Signalson SA and Securitel SPRL (1996) Case C-194/94
- Hellmut Marschall v Land Nordrhein-Westfalen (1997) Case C-409/95
- Commission v France (1997) Case C-265/95
- Inter-Environnement Wallonie ASBL v Région wallonne (1997) Case C-129/96
- María Martínez Sala v Freistaat Bayern (1998) Case C-85/96
- A. Racke GmbH & Co. v Hauptzollamt Mainz (1998) Case C-162/96
- Centros Ltd v Erhvervs- og Selskabsstyrelsen (1999) Case C-212/97
- Albany International BV v Stichting Bedrijfspensioenfonds Textielindustrie (1999) Case C-67/96
- Dieter Krombach v André Bamberski (2000) Case C-7/98
- Germany v Parliament (2000) Case C-376/98
