= Allianz SpA v West Tankers =

- European Court of Justice

Submitted 2 April 2007 Decided 10 February 2009
- Full case name: Allianz SpA, formerly Riunione Adriatica di Sicurtà SpA, Generali Assicurazioni Generali SpA, v West Tankers Inc.
- Case: C‑185/07
- CelexID: 62007CJ0185
- ECLI: ECLI:EU:C:2009:69
- Case type: Reference for a preliminary ruling
- Chamber: Full chamber
- Procedural history: Reference of the House of Lords (United Kingdom)

Court composition
- Judge-Rapporteur; J. Klučka
- President; V. Skouris
- Judges: P. Jann; L. C.W.A. Timmermans; A. Rosas; K. Lenaerts; A. Ó Caoimh; P. Kūris; E. Juhász; G. Arestis; A. Borg Barthet; E. Levits; L. Bay Larsen
- Advocate General; J. Kokott

Legislation affecting
- Interprets Brussels Regulation

Keywords
- antisuit injunction, arbitration

Allianz SpA v West Tankers (Case C-185/07) is a preliminary ruling by the Grand Chamber of the Court of Justice of the European Union (CJEU) following a reference from the United Kingdom's House of Lords. The case stemmed from a 2000 incident in Syracuse (Italy), where the Front Comor, a vessel owned by West Tankers and chartered by Erg Petroli SpA (Erg), collided with a jetty also owned by Erg, causing damage to the jetty.

The CJEU's judgment, delivered on 10 February 2009, addressed the interplay between arbitration agreements and the Brussels Regulation. The Court held that the validity of arbitration agreements falls within the scope of the Brussels Regulation. Crucially, it also ruled that anti-suit injunctions, which aim to restrain a party from commencing or continuing proceedings in the court of another EU member state, cannot be granted if those proceedings are brought in a Brussels Regulation member state, even if they are in breach of an arbitration agreement.

The Court reasoned that such injunctions are incompatible with the principle of mutual trust between member states and would undermine the effectiveness of the Brussels Regulation. However, the ruling clarified that national courts can issue anti-suit injunctions against proceedings brought in courts outside the Brussels Regulation area.

== See also ==
- List of European Court of Justice rulings
