= Francovich v Italy =

Decision of the European Court of Justice

- European Court of Justice

Submitted 8 January 1990 Decided 19 November 1991
- Full case name: Andrea Francovich and Danila Bonifaci and others v Italian Republic.
- Case: C-6/90
- CelexID: 61990CJ0006
- ECLI: ECLI:EU:C:1991:428
- Case type: Reference for a preliminary ruling
- Chamber: Full court
- Nationality of parties: Italy
- Procedural history: Pretura di Bassano del Grappa, Sezione lavoro, ordinanza del 30 December 1989, Pretura di Bassano del Grappa, Sezione lavoro, sentenza del 9 July 1992 3 August 1992 (273/92), Pretura circondariale di Bassano del Grappa, sentenza del 9 December 1993 (162/93), Pretura circondariale di Bassano del Grappa, ordinanza del 21 March 1995 (839 RG 162/93), Pretura di Vicenza, Sezione lavoro, ordinanza del 9 July 1989 10 July 1989 (1186/89), Pretura circondariale di Vicenza, Sezione lavoro, ordinanza del 16 December 1993 (206/93 (1186/89))

Ruling
- 1. The provisions of Council Directive 80/987/EEC of 20 October 1980 on the approximation of the laws of the Member States relating to the protection of employees in the event of the insolvency of their employer which determine the rights of employees must be interpreted as meaning that the persons concerned cannot enforce those rights against the State before the national courts where no implementing measures are adopted within the prescribed period; 2. A Member State is required to make good loss and damage caused to individuals by failure to transpose Directive 80/987/EEC.

Court composition
- Judge Rapporteur; Gil Carlos Rodríguez Iglesias
- Advocate General; Jean Mischo

Francovich v Italy (1991) C-6/90 was a decision of the European Court of Justice which established that European Union Member States could be liable to pay compensation to individuals who suffered a loss by reason of the Member State's failure to transpose an EU directive into national law. This principle is sometimes known as the principle of state liability or "the rule in Francovich" in European Union law.

== Facts ==
Under the Insolvency Protection Directive 80/987/EC, EU Member States were expected to enact provisions in their national law to provide for a minimum level of insurance for employees who had wages unpaid if their employers went insolvent. Mr Francovich, who had worked in Vicenza for CDN Elettronica SnC, was owed 6 million Lira, and Mrs Bonifaci and 33 of her colleagues were owed 253 million Lira together after their company, Gaia Confezioni Srl, had gone bankrupt. The Directive was meant to be implemented by 1983, but five years later they had been paid nothing, as the company liquidators had informed them that no money was left. They brought a claim against the Italian state, arguing that it must pay damages to compensate for their losses instead, on account of a failure to implement the Directive.

== Judgment ==
The European Court of Justice held that the Italian government had breached its obligations, and was liable to compensate the workers' loss resulting from the breach. The Court further held that the damages for such breaches should be available before national courts, and that to establish state liability on the basis of the failure to implement a directive, claimants must prove that the directive conferred specific rights on them, identifiable in its wording, and that there is a causal link between the state's failure to implement the directive and the loss suffered.

31 It should be borne in mind at the outset that the EEC Treaty has created its own legal system, which is integrated into the legal systems of the Member States and which their courts are bound to apply. The subjects of that legal system are not only the Member States but also their nationals. Just as it imposes burdens on individuals, Community law is also intended to give rise to rights which become part of their legal patrimony. Those rights arise not only where they are expressly granted by the Treaty but also by virtue of obligations which the Treaty imposes in a clearly defined manner both on individuals and on the Member States and the Community institutions (see the judgments in Case 26/62 Van Gend en Loos [1963] ECR 1 and Case 6/64 Costa v ENEL [1964] ECR 585).

32 Furthermore, it has been consistently held that the national courts whose task it is to apply the provisions of Community law in areas within their jurisdiction must ensure that those rules take full effect and must protect the rights which they confer on individuals (see in particular the judgments in Case 106/77 Amministrazione delle Finanze dello Stato v Simmenthal [1978] ECR 629, paragraph 16, and Case C-213/89 Factortame [1990] ECR I-2433, paragraph 19).

33 The full effectiveness of Community rules would be impaired and the protection of the rights which they grant would be weakened if individuals were unable to obtain redress when their rights are infringed by a breach of Community law for which a Member State can be held responsible.

34 The possibility of obtaining redress from the Member State is particularly indispensable where, as in this case, the full effectiveness of Community rules is subject to prior action on the part of the State and where, consequently, in the absence of such action, individuals cannot enforce before the national courts the rights conferred upon them by Community law.

35 It follows that the principle whereby a State must be liable for loss and damage caused to individuals as a result of breaches of Community law for which the State can be held responsible is inherent in the system of the Treaty.

== Enforcement ==
The court stipulated that national procedures should determine how each Member State's liability was to be enforced. In an analysis of 35 cases following Francovich v Italy (1991), Takis Tridimas has shown that the European Court of Justice takes one of three approaches to resolving disputes of state liability:

1. Outcome cases: the court provides the referring national court ready-made specific solutions that leave almost no room for maneuverability. In these cases, the court will determine the compatibility of a national measure with European Union law or provide “as to how the correct interpretation of the EU requires the dispute to be resolved”, thereby demonstrating the liability.
2. Guidance cases: the court provides guidelines and clarifications designed to inform the national court’s interpretation of the compatibility of national law with European Union law. The court does not directly establish the liability for the national authority.
3. Deference cases: the court provides an abstract or theoretical ruling, leaving to the national court the determination of seriousness and compatibility. These cases appear less.

It has also been shown that the principle of state liability has primarily served commercial interests in the Union. There are several obstacles to state liability for other groups of rights (environmental, social, consumer) including the inability to claim an ‘identifiable right’ under the judgment, struggling to sue as the losses are spread over many claimants, and an inability to prove the loss for an individual (environmental pollution).

== See also ==
- United Kingdom labour law
- European labour law
- Direct effect
- Incidental effect
- Indirect effect
