= CIA Security International SA v Signalson SA and Securitel SPRL =

1996 EU law case

CIA Security International v Signalson and Securitel
- European Court of Justice

Submitted 4 July 1994 Decided 30 April 1996
- Full case name: CIA Security International SA v Signalson SA and Securitel SPRL
- Case: C-194/94
- CelexID: 61994CJ0194
- ECLI: ECLI:EU:C:1996:172
- Language of proceedings: French
- Nationality of parties: Belgium

Court composition
- Judge-Rapporteur; C. Gulmann
- President; G.C. Rodríguez Iglesias
- Judges: C.N. Kakouris; D.A.O. Edward; J.-P. Puissochet; G.F. Mancini; J.C. Moitinho de Almeida; P.J.G. Kapteyn; J.L. Murray; H. Ragnemalm; L. Sevón
- Advocate General; M.B. Elmer

Legislation affecting
- Article 30 of the EC Treaty; Council Directive 83/189/EEC, as amended by Council Directive 88/182/EEC

Keywords
- Direct Effect

CIA Security v Signalson and Securitel (1996) C-194/94 is an EU law case, concerning the conflict of law between a national legal system and European Union law.

== Facts ==
Signalson and Securitel publicly claimed that a competitor, CIA Security, had acted contrary to a Belgian law of 1990, which required security firms to get government authority to operate, and a decree in 1991 that alarm systems be authorised. Directive 83/189 said all ‘technical regulations’ had to be notified to the Commission, and some provisions would not come in force for specified periods. The Belgian 1990 law and 1991 decree had not been notified. CIA Security sought an order to prevent Signalson and Securitel making statements that it did not comply with the law. They counterclaimed that CIA did not comply with Belgian law. CIA argued that because the 1990 law and 1991 decree was not notified, it did not apply.

== Judgment ==
The ECJ held that the Belgian Law of 1990 was not a ‘technical regulation’ that needed to be notified, but the 1991 decree was, and should have been notified. Therefore the Belgian courts were not entitled to apply the 1991 decree. It followed that CIA Security was capable of invoking EU law to assert that Signalson and Securitel should not allege it was in breach of the Belgian decree of 1991.

== See also ==
- European Union law
