= Unilever Italia SpA v Central Food SpA =

EU law case

Unilever v Central Food
- European Court of Justice

Submitted 7 December 1998 Decided 26 September 2000
- Full case name: Unilever Italia SpA v Central Food SpA.
- Case: C-443/98
- CelexID: 61998CJ0443
- ECLI: ECLI:EU:C:2000:496
- Language of proceedings: Italian
- Nationality of parties: Italy

Court composition
- Judge-Rapporteur; C. Gulmann
- President; G.C. Rodríguez Iglesias
- Judges: L. Sevón; R. Schintgen; P.J.G. Kapteyn; J.-P. Puissochet; H. Ragnemalm; M. Wathelet; V. Skouris
- Advocate General; F.G. Jacobs

Legislation affecting
- Article 177 of the EC Treaty; Council Directive 83/189/EEC, as amended by Directive 94/10/EC of the European Parliament

Unilever Italia SpA v Central Food SpA (2000) C-443/98 is an EU law case, concerning the conflict of law between a national legal system and European Union law.

== Facts ==
Unilever sold olive oil to Central Food, which refused to pay on the ground the oil did not comply with Italian law. This was a ‘technical regulation’ under Directive 83/189. Unilever claimed damages for breach of contract. The question was referred to the European Court of Justice, whether the Directive precluded enforcement of the contract.

== Judgment ==
The European Court of Justice upheld Unilever's claim that the law could not be applied. The Directive was a procedural bar to adopting national legislation.

== See also ==
- European Union law
