= Sabel v Puma =

Decision of the European Court of Justice

- European Court of Justice

Decided 11 November 1997
- Full case name: SABEL BV v Puma AG, Rudolf Dassler Sport.
- Case: C-251/95
- CelexID: 61995CJ0251
- ECLI: ECLI:EU:C:1997:528
- Case type: Reference for a preliminary ruling

Ruling
- The criterion of 'likelihood of confusion which includes the likelihood of association with the earlier mark‘ contained in Article 4(1)(b) of First Council Directive 89/104/EEC of 21 December 1988 to approximate the laws of the Member States relating to trade marks is to be interpreted as meaning that the mere association which the public might make between two trade marks as a result of their analogous semantic content is not in itself a sufficient ground for concluding that there is a likelihood of confusion within the meaning of that provision.

Court composition
- Judge-Rapporteur; Claus Christian Gulmann
- Advocate General; Francis Geoffrey Jacobs

Sabel v Puma (1997) C-251/95 was a decision of the European Court of Justice which clarified the meaning of "likelihood of confusion" in trade mark infringement cases. The key point of this decision was that the likelihood of association is not the same as, and not sufficient to conclude a likelihood of confusion.

== Facts ==
A Dutch company Sabel tried to apply for a figurative trade mark in the German trade mark register. The mark included the word "SABEL" and a figure of a bounding feline. The German company Puma lodged opposition to the registration of that mark on the ground that it had an earlier registered mark, also depicting a bounding feline, for similar goods.

The German Patent and Trade Mark Office considered there to be no resemblance between the two marks and rejected the opposition. Puma therefore appealed to the Federal Patents Court, which held that there was a resemblance between the two marks. Subsequently, Sabel appealed to the Bundesgerichtshof for annulment of the decision refusing its application.

The Bundesgerichtshof provisionally considered that there was no likelihood of confusion. However, it still sought clarification on the ambiguous wording of Article 4(1)(b) of Directive 89/104/EEC (now the Trade Marks Directive), which stated that "a likelihood of confusion on the part of the public, [...] includes the likelihood of association with the earlier trade mark".

The Bundesgerichtshof therefore stayed the proceedings and decided to refer the following question to the Court of Justice for a preliminary ruling:

'With reference to the interpretation of Article 4(1)(b) of the First Council Directive of 21 December 1988 to approximate the laws of the Member States relating to trade marks, is it sufficient for a finding that there is a likelihood of confusion between a sign composed of text and picture and a sign consisting merely of a picture, which is registered for identical and similar goods and is not especially well known to the public, that the two signs coincide as to their semantic content (in this case, a bounding feline)? What is the significance in this connection of the wording of the Directive, in terms of which the likelihood of confusion includes the likelihood that a mark may be associated with an earlier mark?‘

Article 4(1)(b) of the Directive sets out grounds on which registration of a mark can be refused, or on which registered marks may be declared invalid.

== Judgment ==
The Court begins by outlining certain provisions of the Directive and notes that the “likelihood of association” was included in Article 4(1)(b) at the request of the Benelux countries to better align with their trademark laws and practices. In this context, likelihood of association in the strict sense means that "the public considers the sign to be similar to the mark and perception of the sign calls to mind the memory of the mark, although the two are not confused".

In line with the Opinion of the Advocate General, the Court decided that a likelihood of association was not sufficient and could not be regarded as an alternative to a likelihood of confusion.

== Significance ==
Besides the key clarification on the likelihood of confusion and the likelihood of association, this decision also provides significant guidance on the criteria for assessing the likelihood of confusion between two signs:

- The likelihood of confusion must therefore be appreciated globally, taking into account all factors relevant to the circumstances of the case.
- This global appreciation must be based on the overall impression given by the marks, taking their distinctive and dominant components into account, as the average consumer normally perceives a mark as a whole and does not proceed to analyse its various details.
- The more distinctive the earlier mark, the higher the likelihood of confusion. But where this earlier mark is not especially well known to the public and consists of an image with little imaginative content, the mere fact that the two marks are conceptually similar is not sufficient to give rise to a likelihood of confusion.

This case was a first indication of new case law of the Court, where it established that the protection of EU trade mark law goes beyond its primary function, the origin function.
