= Faccini Dori v Recreb Srl =

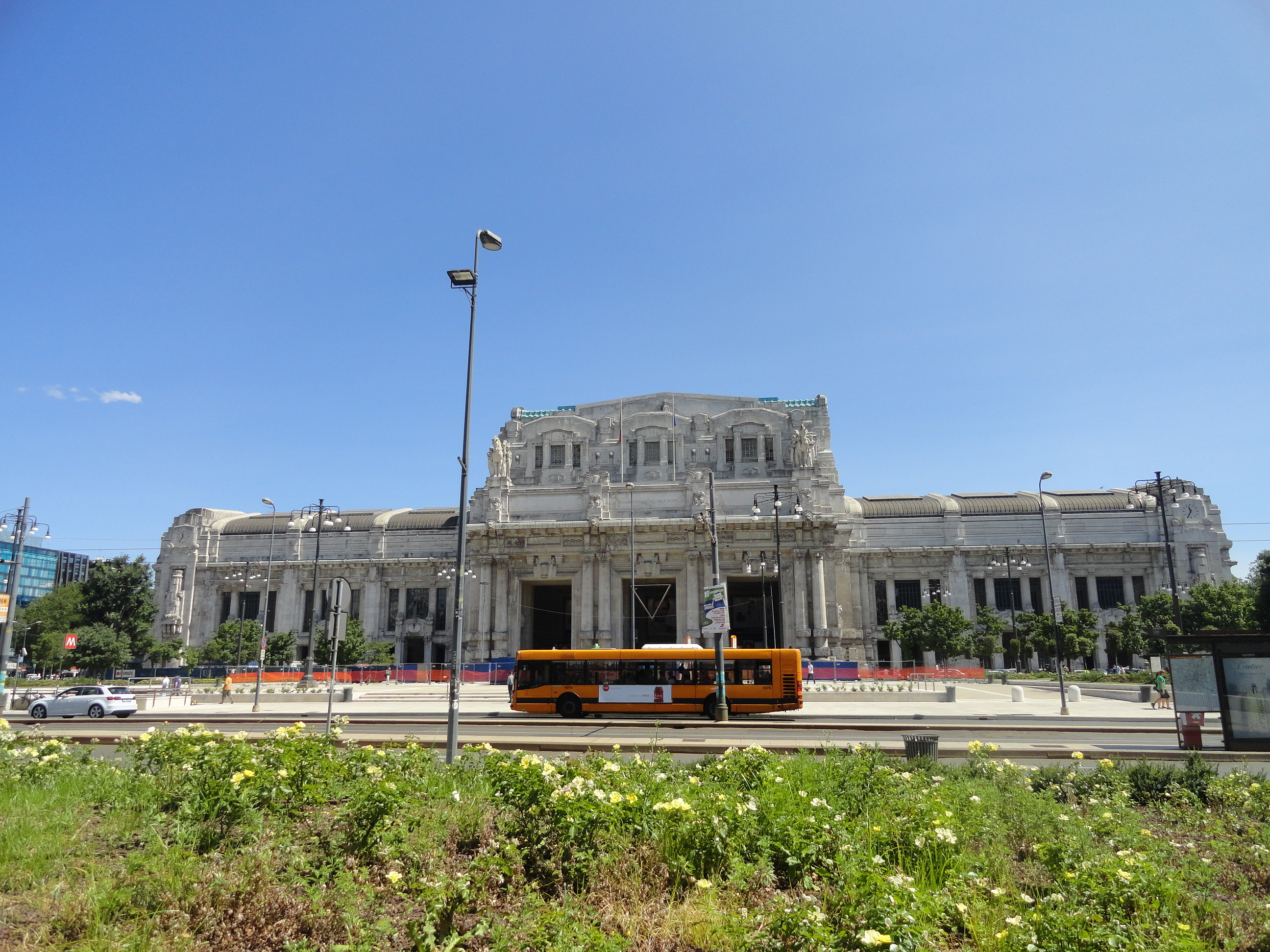
- Court: European Court of Justice
- Citations: (1994) C-91/92, [1994] ECR I-3325

Keywords
- Employee

Paola Faccini Dori v Recreb Srl (1994) C-91/92 is an EU law case, concerning the conflict of law between a national legal system and European Union law.

== Facts ==
Interdiffusion Srl concluded a contract with Miss Faccini Dori at Milan Central Railway Station for an English language correspondence course. Miss Dori cancelled her order, but was then told Interdiffusion had assigned a claim against her to Recreb Srl. Miss Dori asserted she had a right of cancellation within 7 days under the Consumer Long Distance Contracts Directive 85/577/EEC. Italy had not taken steps to transpose the Directive into national law.

The Italian Court, the Giudice Conciliatore di Firenze, ordered Miss Dori to pay the money. She objected, and the court made a reference to the European Court of Justice.

== Judgment ==
=== Advocate General Opinion ===
AG Lenz favoured granting horizontal direct effect to EU directives.

=== Court of Justice ===
The Court of Justice held that Miss Dori had a right under the Directive, its provisions were unconditional and sufficiently precise, but without national implementing law she could not rely on the directive itself in an action against another private party: this followed TEEC article 189 (now TFEU article 288) saying that Directives are 'binding only in relation to "each Member State to which it is addressed".' However, the court would be under a duty to interpret national law, as far as possible in line with the Directive's purpose. Moreover, the state would have to 'make good the damage' caused for failure to implement the law.

5. According to the fourth recital in the preamble, where contracts are concluded away from the business premises of the trader, it is as a rule the trader who initiates the negotiations, for which the consumer is wholly unprepared and is therefore often taken by surprise. In most cases, the consumer is not in a position to compare the quality and price of the offer with other offers. According to the same recital, that surprise element generally exists not only in contracts made on the doorstep but also in other forms of contract for which the trader takes the initiative away from his business premises.

[...]

26. It must also be borne in mind that, as the Court has consistently held since its judgment in Case 14/83 Von Colson and Kamann v Land Nordrhein-Westfalen [1984] ECR 1891, paragraph 26, the Member States' obligation arising from a directive to achieve the result envisaged by the directive and their duty under Article 5 of the Treaty to take all appropriate measures, whether general or particular, is binding on all the authorities of Member States, including, for matters within their jurisdiction, the courts. The judgments of the Court in Case C-106/89 Marleasing v La Comercial Internacional de Alimentación [1990] ECR I-4135, paragraph 8, and Case C-334/92 Wagner Miret v Fondo de Garantía Salarial [1993] ECR I-6911, paragraph 20, make it clear that, when applying national law, whether adopted before or after the directive, the national court that has to interpret that law must do so, as far as possible, in the light of the wording and the purpose of the directive so as to achieve the result it has in view and thereby comply with the third paragraph of Article 189 of the Treaty.

27. If the result prescribed by the directive cannot be achieved by way of interpretation, it should also be borne in mind that, in terms of the judgment in Joined Cases C-6/90 and C-9/90 Francovich and Others v Italy [1991] ECR I-5357, paragraph 39, Community law requires the Member States to make good damage caused to individuals through failure to transpose a directive, provided that three conditions are fulfilled. First, the purpose of the directive must be to grant rights to individuals. Second, it must be possible to identify the content of those rights on the basis of the provisions of the directive. Finally, there must be a causal link between the breach of the State' s obligation and the damage suffered.

28. The directive on contracts negotiated away from business premises is undeniably intended to confer rights on individuals and it is equally certain that the minimum content of those rights can be identified by reference to the provisions of the directive alone....

29. Where damage has been suffered and that damage is due to a breach by the State of its obligation, it is for the national court to uphold the right of aggrieved consumers to obtain reparation in accordance with national law on liability.

30. So, as regards the second issue raised by the national court, the answer must be that in the absence of measures transposing the directive within the prescribed time-limit consumers cannot derive from the directive itself a right of cancellation as against traders with whom they have concluded a contract or enforce such a right in a national court. However, when applying provisions of national law, whether adopted before or after the directive, the national court must interpret them as far as possible in the light of the wording and purpose of the directive.

== See also ==
- European Union law
