= Indirect effect =

Indirect effect is a principle of the European Union (EU) law, whereby national courts of the member states of the EU are required to interpret national law in line with provisions of EU law. The principle of indirect effect contrasts with the principle of direct effect, which, under certain conditions, allows individuals to invoke the EU law itself before national courts.

The indirect effect arises from the failure of a member state to implement a directive—either correctly or at all—but where the direct effect cannot apply because the party against whom the directive is sought to be enforced is a private entity or otherwise fails to meet the conditions which would give the directive direct effect. In Von Colson and Kamann v Land Nordrhein-Westfalen, the ECJ ruled that national courts should interpret national law in line with the directive, "in so far as it is given the discretion to do so under national law". While Von Colson dealt with a situation where a member state had failed to implement a directive correctly, in Marleasing v La Comercial Internacional de Alimentacion the ECJ extended indirect effect to situations where the member state concerned had not implemented the directive at all.

While the indirect effect is of great importance especially in relation to directives, recommendations and opinions could have indirect effect as well. Recommendations and opinions have no binding force, like directives have. However, in Grimaldi v Fonds des Maladies Professionnelles the ECJ has ruled that since recommendations and opinions must have some legal effect, they should be taken into consideration when dealing with measures that the two were supposed to supplement.

== See also ==
- European Union law
- Direct effect
- Incidental effect
- Francovich v Italy
