= Srl CILFIT v Ministry of Health =

EU law case

CILFIT v Ministry of Health
- European Court of Justice

Submitted 27 March 1981 Decided 6 October 1982
- Full case name: Srl CILFIT and Lanificio di Gavardo SpA v Ministry of Health
- Case: C-283/81
- CelexID: 61981CJ0283
- ECLI: ECLI:EU:C:1982:335
- Nationality of parties: Italy

Court composition
- Judge-Rapporteur; France Adolphe Touffait
- Advocate General; Francesco Capotorti

Keywords
- Preliminary references

Srl CILFIT v Ministry of Health (1982) is an EU law case, concerning preliminary references to the Court of Justice of the European Union.

== Facts ==
CILFIT, a wool importer, contested the amount it had paid by way of fixed health inspection levy. Appeals by CILFIT were denied, and the case reached the Court of Cassation. In the Court of Cassation, the Ministry of Health argued that the factual circumstances of the case were so obvious as to rule out any other possible interpretation, so there would not be a need for a preliminary ruling. The Court of Cassation then referred the case to Court of Justice.

== Judgment ==
The Court of Justice held that a national court of last instance is under no obligation to refer when the issue is acte clair or when the ECJ has already ruled on the question of interpretation referred by the national court. It said there is no need to refer if there is already a judgment, and continued.

16. ... the correct application of Community law may be so obvious as to leave no scope for any reasonable doubt as to the manner in which the question raised is to be resolved. Before it comes to the conclusion that such is the case, the national court or tribunal must be convinced that the matter is equally obvious to the courts of the other member states and to the Court of Justice. Only if those conditions are satisfied, may the national court or tribunal refrain from submitting the question to the Court of Justice and take upon itself the responsibility for resolving it.

[...]

20. ... every provision of Community law must be placed in its context and interpreted in the light of the provisions of Community law as a whole, regard being had to the objectives thereof and to its state of evolution at the date on which the provision in question is to be applied.

== Significance ==
CILFIT case is famous for two things: reaffirming the principle that EU law must be interpreted in its context and with the goals of EU Law in mind, and establishing criteria when a preliminary ruling from EU court does not need to be requested.

== See also ==
- European Union law
