= Simmental (disambiguation) =

Simmental may refer to:

- Simmental, an alpine valley in the Bernese Oberland of Switzerland;
- Simmental cattle, a versatile breed of cattle originating in the valley of the Simme River, in the Bernese Oberland of western Switzerland;
- French Simmental, a French cattle breed, closely related to the Simmental cattle;
- Simmental Fleckvieh, another name of the Fleckvieh cattle, closely related to the Simmental cattle.
- Simmenthal, a brand of canned meats.
- The European Court of Justice ruling in Amministrazione delle Finanze dello Stato v Simmenthal SpA, March 1978, regarding the canned meat company.
