= Marleasing SA v La Comercial Internacional de Alimentacion SA =

- European Court of Justice

Submitted 3 April 1989 Decided 13 November 1990
- Full case name: Marleasing SA v La Comercial Internacional de Alimentacion SA
- Case: C-106/89
- CelexID: 61989CJ0106
- ECLI: ECLI:EU:C:1990:395
- Case type: Reference for a preliminary ruling
- Chamber: Sixth chamber
- Nationality of parties: Spain
- Procedural history: Juzgado de Primera Instancia e Instrucción nº 1 de Oviedo, auto de 13 March 1989, Juzgado de Primera Instancia e Instrucción nº 1 de Oviedo, sentencia de 23 February 1991

Court composition
- Judge-Rapporteur; Tom O'Higgins
- Advocate General; Walter van Gerven

Legislation affecting
- Interprets Directive 68/151/EEC

Marleasing SA v La Comercial Internacional de Alimentación SA (1990) C-106/89 was a decision of the European Court of Justice concerning the indirect effect of European Community law, now European Union law. It established that the courts of European Union member states have a duty to interpret national legislation in the light of unimplemented European Union directives.

== Facts ==
Marleasing SA (the Applicant) brought an application before the Spanish national courts for an order that the contract establishing "La Comercial" was void and that the formation of La Comercial should be nullified on the grounds that establishment "lacked cause, was a sham transaction and was carried out in order to defraud the creditors of Barviesa (a co-founder of La Comercial)". Spanish law at the time, Articles 1261 and 1275 of the Spanish Civil Code, stated that "contracts without cause or whose cause is unlawful have no legal effect". La Comercial argued that the action should be dismissed in its entirety on the grounds that article 11 of the First Council Directive 68/151/EEC of 9 March 1968 on coordination of safeguards which, for the protection of the interests of members and others, which had not yet been implemented by Spain, provided an exhaustive list of the cases under which the nullity of a company may be ordered and that "lack of cause" was not a ground listed therein. The Spanish court then referred the following question to the European Court of Justice:

"Is Article 11 of [the] Council Directive 68/151/EEC of 9 March 1968, which has not been implemented in national law, directly applicable so as to preclude a declaration of nullity of a public limited liability company on a ground other than those set out in the said article?"

== Judgment ==
The ECJ held that the Spanish Courts were under a duty to interpret national law in a way that gave effect to European law.

...it should be observed that, as the Court pointed out in its judgment in Case 14/83 Von Colson and Kamann v Land Nordrhein-Westfalen [1984] ECR 1891, paragraph 26, the Member States' obligation arising from a directive to achieve the result envisaged by the directive and their duty under Article 5 of the Treaty (article 4(3) TEU now) to take all appropriate measures, whether general or particular, to ensure the fulfilment of that obligation, is binding on all the authorities of Member States including, for matters within their jurisdiction, the courts. It follows that, in applying national law, whether the provisions in question were adopted before or after the directive, the national court called upon to interpret it is required to do so, as far as possible, in the light of the wording and the purpose of the directive in order to achieve the result pursued by the latter and thereby comply with the third paragraph of Article 189 of the Treaty."

== See also ==
- Direct effect
