= Reyners v Belgium =

- European Court of Justice

Submitted 9 January 1974 Decided 1 June 1974
- Full case name: Jean Reyners v Belgian State
- Case: C-2/74
- CelexID: 61974CJ0002
- ECLI: ECLI:EU:C:1974:68
- Procedural history: Council of State (Belgium)

Court composition
- Judge-Rapporteur; Pierre Pescatore
- Advocate General; Henri Mayras

Keywords
- Free movement of services

Reyners v Belgium (1974) Case 2/74 is an EU law case, concerning the free movement of services in the European Union.

== Facts ==
Jean Reyners was a Dutch national with a degree in law. He applied for admission to the Bar of Belgium but was refused on the grounds that he lacked Belgian nationality. He claimed that this breached the Treaty's provisions on free movement of services, now Article 56 TFEU.

The Belgian Conseil d'Etat asked the European Court of Justice (ECJ) whether the legal profession of avocat was wholly exempt under the Art 51 TFEU official authority exception, given that part of the business was concerned with exercise of official authority. The Luxembourg government also argued that the whole profession should be exempt, given that it was "connected organically" to the public administration of justice.

Advocate general Mayras gave an opinion that "official authority" is "the power of enjoying the prerogatives outside the general law, privileges of official power, and powers of coercion over citizens".

== Judgment ==
The European Court of Justice held that Article 49 TFEU was directly effective, even though directives had not been adopted. It laid down a precise result to be achieved. The advocate profession was not exempted from Article 49 under Article 51, because judicial exercise of power was left intact. There needed to be a single community definition and that the exemption could not be construed more broadly than would fit its purpose. If specific activities involving exercise of official authority are severable from the rest of a profession, then Article 51 cannot apply to exempt the whole lot.

26 In laying down that freedom of establishment shall be attained at the end of the transitional period, article 52 thus imposes an obligation to attain a precise result, the fulfilment of which had to be made easier by, but not made dependent on, the implementation of a programme of progressive measures.

[...]

52 The most typical activities of the profession of avocat, in particular, such as consultation and legal assistance and also representation of the defence of parties in court, even when the intervention or assistance of the avocat is compulsory or is a legal monopoly, cannot be considered as connected with the exercise of official authority.

53 The exercise of these activities leaves the discretion of judicial authority and the free exercise of judicial power intact.

== See also ==
- Van Binsbergen v Bestuur van de Bedrijfsvereniging voor de Metaalnijverheid
- European Union law
