= Insolvency Protection Directive 2008 =

The Insolvency Protection Directive 2008/94/EC is an EU Directive concerning the protection of employees in the event of insolvency of an employer. It replaced Directive 80/987/EC and 2002/74/EC in turn.

== Contents ==
The recitals of the Directive state its purpose is the protection of employees, in the interests of ‘balanced economic and social development’. It makes reference to the Charter of Social Rights for Workers 1989. In particular, recital 8 contains a declaration of the law's ‘social purpose’.

- article 1(2) ‘Member States may, by way of exception, exclude claims by certain categories of employee from the scope of the Directive, by virtue of the special nature of the employee’s contract of employment or employment relationship or of the existence of other forms of guarantee…’
- article 3, ‘Member States shall take the measures necessary to ensure that guarantee institutions guarantee, subject to article 4.
- article 4, payment of employees’ outstanding claims resulting from contracts of employment or employment relationships, including, where provided for by national law, severance pay on termination of employment relationships. The claims taken over by the guarantee institution shall be the outstanding pay claims relating to a period prior to and/or, as applicable, after a given date determined by the Member States.’

== Member state law ==
In the United Kingdom, the relevant implementing legislation is found in the Employment Rights Act 1996. Under section 166 any employee may lodge a claim with the National Insurance Fund for outstanding wages.

In Italy, the Directive gave rise to Francovich v Italy on the principle of member state liability for non-implementation of EU law.

== See also ==
- EU law
- UK insolvency law
- UK labour law
- Francovich v Italy (1990) C-6/90
