= Vatsouras and Koupatantze v ARGE =

- European Court of Justice

Decided 4 June 2009
- Full case name: Athanasios Vatsouras (C-22/08) and Josif Koupatantze (C-23/08) v Arbeitsgemeinschaft (ARGE) Nürnberg 900.
- Case: C-22/08 and C-23/08
- ECLI: ECLI:EU:C:2009:344
- Case type: Reference for a preliminary ruling
- Chamber: Full court
- Nationality of parties: Greek

Ruling
- 1. With respect to the rights of nationals of Member States seeking employment in another Member State, examination of the first question has not disclosed any factor capable of affecting the validity of Article 24(2) of Directive 2004/38/EC of the European Parliament and of the Council of 29 April 2004 on the right of citizens of the Union and their family members to move and reside freely within the territory of the Member States, amending Regulation (EEC) No 1612/68 and repealing Directives 64/221/EEC, 68/360/EEC, 72/194/EEC, 73/148/EEC, 75/34/EEC, 75/35/EEC, 90/364/EEC, 90/365/EEC and 93/96/EEC. 2.Article 12 EC does not preclude national rules which exclude nationals of Member States of the European Union from receipt of social assistance benefits which are granted to nationals of non-member countries.

Court composition
- Judge Rapporteur; J.N. Cunha Rodrigues
- Advocate General; D. Ruiz-Jarabo Colomer

Vatsouras and Koupatantze v ARGE (C-22/08 and C-23/08) is a case decided by the European Court of Justice which deals with the concepts of 'worker' and 'social assistance' under European Union law.

== Facts ==
Two Greek nationals, Mr. Vatsouras and Mr. Koupatantze, took up work in the Federal Republic of Germany, of both a low paid nature and a relatively limited period of time. After this period of employment, they both became involuntarily unemployed. Because of their unemployment, they were granted social assistance by the ARGE (German employment agency). After a short period of time however, their assistance was withdrawn, with the ARGE citing a provision of German law which excludes foreign nationals from receiving social assistance if their right of residence arises solely out of the search of employment. This German provision was based upon Article 24(2) of the Union Citizenship Directive, which states that Member States are not obliged to provide assistance for more than three months to foreign jobseekers whose right of residence arises solely out of the search for employment.

Both men unsuccessfully filed an objection against this decision of withdrawal of benefits, after which they appealed to the decision at the Social Court in Nuremberg. The Nuremberg judge then decided to refer the case to the European Court of Justice for a preliminary ruling.

== The first legal question ==
The first (and main) legal question posed by the Nuremberg Court was

Is Article 24 (2) of Directive 2004/38 of the European Parliament and of the Council of 29 April 2004 compatible with Article 18 TFEU (formerly Article 12 EC), read in conjunction with Article 45 TFEU (formerly Article 39 EC)?

This legal question relies on the presumption that Mr. Vatsouras and Mr. Koupatantze were not workers within the meaning of article 45 TFEU. If they had been qualified as workers by the German employment agency, they would have been fully entitled to all German benefits on the basis of Article 24(1) of the Citizenship Directive, which guarantees equal treatment for workers and prohibits discrimination on the basis of nationality. However, following the domestic employment agency's assertion that they were not workers, this legal question asks whether or not the refusal of benefits on the basis of article 24(2) of the Citizenship Directive was compatible with a long line of case law established on the basis of primary EU law articles 18 and 45 TFEU.

== Court's ruling regarding the first question ==
=== On the status of worker ===
Although the Nuremberg Court relied on the presumption that Mr. Vatsouras and Mr. Koupatantze were not workers within the meaning of article 45 TFEU, the European Court of Justice nonetheless expanded on the question of whether or not they should have been qualified as workers. The referring court came to the conclusion that they were not workers on the grounds that Mr. Vatsouras' professional activity did not ensure him a livelihood, and Mr. Koupatantze's employment lasted barely over one month. The short lived and low paid nature of employment therefore prevented a qualification as 'worker' within the meaning of article 45 TFEU.

The European Court of Justice however, although reaffirming the principle that it is up to the national court to determine if the factual conditions triggering the application of a European Union rule are fulfilled, proceeds to cite several former ECJ rulings that deal with the status of worker. In these cited rulings, the broad nature of the concept of 'worker' is strongly emphasised, reiterating the Court's official viewpoint that anybody performing services for a certain period of time for and under the direction of another person, in return of which he receives remuneration, is to be considered a worker within the meaning of article 45 TFEU. As a consequence, anyone pursuing a real and genuine activity that is not purely marginal or ancillary, is to be regarded as a worker, and neither the limited amount of remuneration, nor the limited duration of the activity, can be deemed sufficient to exclude a person from falling within the scope of article 45 TFEU.

=== On the compatibility between Article 24(2) of the Citizenship Directive and EU primary law ===
Following the domestic court's hypothesis that Mr. Vatsouras and Mr. Koupatantze were not workers, the European Court of Justice now inquires whether or not the refusal of benefits on the basis of Article 24(2) of the Citizenship Directive is compatible with the EU primary law provisions articles 18 and 45 TFEU. This question of compatibility between a provision of EU secondary law and the provisions of EU primary law arises because of a long line of case law established by the ECJ on the basis of the latter provisions, which give a broad protection to jobseekers who aren't workers.

The Court's reasoning as regards this main legal question can be subdivided into two separate inferences.

First, the Court cites a multitude of former ECJ case law to define the conditions jobseekers who aren't workers need to fulfill to merit protection under EU primary law. It does so by stating that EU citizens seeking employment in other Member States are also workers under article 45 TFEU, and that benefits designed to facilitate access to employment in the labour markets of those Member States must consequently be protected under that article as well. However, the Court recalls, a Member State can require a 'real link' between the jobseeker and the labour market of the pertaining Member State, a link that can be established if the person concerned has genuinely sought work in the Member State in question for a reasonable period. As a result, the Court comes to two conditions that must be present in order for jobseekers who aren't workers to fall under the protection of EU primary law: they must on the one hand establish a real link with the Member State, and on the other hand, only benefits intended to facilitate access to the labour market can qualify.

Second, the Court jumps back to the main compatibility issue, and the question of whether or not the fact that Vatsouras and Koupatantze were refused benefits under Article 24(2) of the Directive can be justified, given this protection afforded to jobseekers who aren't workers under EU primary law. However, instead of ascertaining whether or not Vatsouras and Koupatantze actually meet the aforementioned two conditions and if the refusal therefore must give rise to an incompatibility, the Court instead questions the application of the Article 24(2) of the Directive itself. It states that benefits must be analysed according to its results, and not formal structure, and concludes that as the German social assistance benefit at hand requires persons, amongst other things, to be capable of earning a living, it is to be considered as intended to facilitate access to the labour market. Therefore, the Court concludes, it cannot be regarded as ‘social assistance’ under Article 24(2) of the Directive, and the derogation provided by Article 24(2) does not apply. As a conclusion, there is no incompatibility to be found between the Directive and primary law, as there is no presence of ‘social assistance’ required to trigger the application of the Directive itself.

== Criticism on the ruling regarding the first legal question ==
Both inferences in the European Court of Justice's ruling in Vatsouras and Koupatantze have met with criticism.

First, the Court may support a broad interpretation of the concept of worker under the article 45 TFEU. This is especially true considering Mr.Koupatantze's situation, seeing that his total time of employment amounts to a mere month and a half, below the three or six month threshold usually formulated in specific regulations. This is said to blur the boundaries between worker and non-worker, and can lead to the question if previous periods of employment will hold out to be a relevant criterion at all towards the future.

Second, criticism has been directed towards the way the Court tackles the issue of compatibility. Through its narrow interpretation of ‘social assistance’, the Court is said to altogether isolate the effect of the concerned provision of the Directive and seem to evade rather than interpret its true meaning. This has been seen as an attitude by the Court of unwillingness to question the legality of the European Union's legislative choices in secondary law, and looking to resolve conflicts between primary and secondary EU law by imposing “forcefully reconciliatory” interpretations instead of formally invalidating provisions. A likely explanation for this has been uttered by some academics: the outcome of the case is more important to the Court than the process, as the process is ignored and bypassed to achieve the desired outcome of, in line with previous case law, promoting an 'integrationist' agenda friendly to free movement and citizenship. Two main criticisms have been formulated against this integrationist approach. First, this decision creates a considerable legal uncertainty, as a distinction must be made now between benefits specifically granted for jobseekers and ‘ordinary‘ social assistance. Some authors consequently wonder if a form of jobseekers benefits that would fall within the latter category even exists. Moreover, the social laws of Member States usually do not classify benefits on the basis of big underlying socio-political objectives such as “facilitating access to the labour market”, but rather, they usually distinguish benefits on the basis of form and type of beneficiary. Second, this decision causes jobseekers to be treated differently depending on the question of whether or not Member States have included them into their general social security system, rather than having granted specific benefits to them. This has been seen to showcase a formal and superficial way to deal with the underlying material problem as to when and when not foreign jobseekers are to be included in the welfare system of the host Member State.
