= Van Binsbergen v Bestuur van de Bedrijfsvereniging voor de Metaalnijverheid =

- European Court of Justice

Decided 3 December 1974
- Full case name: Johannes Henricus Maria van Binsbergen v Bestuur van de Bedrijfsvereniging voor de Metaalnijverheid
- Case: C-33/74
- CelexID: 61974CJ0033
- ECLI: ECLI:EU:C:1974:131

Van Binsbergen v Bestuur van de Bedrijfsvereniging voor de Metaalnijverheid (1974) Case 33/74 is an EU law case, concerning the free movement of services in the European Union.

== Facts ==
A Dutch legal adviser transferred his residence from the Netherlands to Belgium while proceedings were taking place before a Dutch social security court for his client, Mr Van Binsbergen. Dutch law stated only those established in the Netherlands could act as legal advisers. The court asked whether article 56 had direct effect, and if the rule was compatible. UK and Ireland argued that the services article should not have direct effect.

== Judgment ==
The Court of Justice held that TFEU article 56 did have direct effect after the expiry period. The public interest in administration of justice could be ensured by requiring an address for a service to be maintained, rather than a residence.

16 In relation to a professional activity the exercise of which is similarly unrestricted within the territory of a particular member state, the requirement of residence within that state constitutes a restriction which is incompatible with articles 59 and 60 of the Treaty if the administration of justice can satisfactorily be ensured by measures which are less restrictive, such as the choosing of an address for service.

[...]

26 Therefore, as regards at least the specific requirement of nationality or of residence, Articles 59 and 60 impose a well-defined obligation, the fulfilment of which by the member states cannot be delayed or jeopardized by the absence of provisions which were to be adopted in pursuance of powers conferred under Article 63 and 66.

A requirement that the person providing the service must be habitually resident within the territory of the state where the service is to be provided may deprive Article 59 of all useful effect.

== See also ==
- Reyners v Belgium
- European Union law
