= Brasserie du Pêcheur v Germany =

- Court: European Court of Justice
- Citations: (1996) C-46/93 and C-48/93, [1996] ECR I-1029

Keywords
- Preliminary ruling

Brasserie du Pêcheur v Germany and R (Factortame) v SS for Transport (No 3) (1996) C-46/93 and C-48/93 is a joined EU law case, concerning state liability for breach of the law in the European Union.

== Facts ==
A French brewery sued the German government for damages for not allowing it to export beer to Germany in late 1981 for failing to comply with the Biersteuergesetz 1952 9 and 10. The Commission viewed this to breach TEEC article 30 and brought infringement proceedings against Germany for prohibiting (1) marketing for products called beer and (2) importing beer with additives. The ECJ had held the prohibition on marketing was incompatible with the Treaties in Commission v Germany (1987) Case 178/84. Brasserie du Pêcheur then claimed DM 1.8m, a fraction of loss incurred.

The BGH said that under BGB § 839, GG Art. 34 for a state be liable it has to have acted wilfully or negligently, and only if a law was written to benefit a third party.

In the joined case, Spanish fishers sued the UK government for compensation over the Merchant Shipping Act 1988. The UK government argued the legislation had been passed in good faith, and did not mean to breach the Treaty provision, so should not therefore be liable.

In his Opinion, Advocate General Tesauro noted that only 8 damages awards had been made up to 1995.

== Judgment ==
=== Court of Justice ===
The Court of Justice held that it was irrelevant that Parliament passed the statute, and it was still liable. A prior ruling by the ECJ was also not a precondition for liability. For damages, a law (1) had to be intended to confer rights on individuals (2) sufficiently serious (3) causal link between breach and damage. Member state liability flows from the principle of effectiveness of the law. Member state liability follows the same principles of liability governing the EU itself. In a legislative context, with wide discretion, it must be shown there was a manifest and grave disregard for limits on exercise of discretion.

20 As appears from paragraph 33 of the judgment in Francovich and Others, the full effectiveness of Community law would be impaired if individuals were unable to obtain redress when their rights were infringed by a breach of Community law.

[...]

55 As to the second condition, as regards both Community liability under Article 215 and Member State liability for breaches of Community law, the decisive test for finding that a breach of Community law is sufficiently serious is whether the Member State or the Community institution concerned manifestly and gravely disregarded the limits on its discretion.

56 [The Court said factors to consider include...] the clarity and precision of the rule breached, the measure of discretion left by that rule to the national or Community authorities, whether the infringement and the damage caused was intentional or involuntary, whether any error of law was excusable or inexcusable, the fact that the position taken by a Community institution may have contributed toward the omission, and the adopted or retention of national measures or practices contrary to Community law.

57 On any view, a breach of Community law will clearly be sufficiently serious if it has persisted despite a judgment finding the infringement in question to be established, or a preliminary ruling or settled case-law of the Court on the matter from which it is clear that the conduct in question constituted an infringement.

[...]

63. In order to determine whether the breach of Article 52 thus committed by the United Kingdom was sufficiently serious, the national court might take into account, inter alia, the legal disputes relating to particular features of the common fisheries policy, the attitude of the Commission, which made its position known to the United Kingdom in good time, and the assessments as to the state of certainty of Community law made by the national courts in the interim proceedings brought by individuals affected by the Merchant Shipping Act.

=== Bundesgerichtshof ===
When the Brasserie case returned to the German High Court for Civil Matters (Bundesgerichtshof) then decided the violations were not sufficient to make Germany liable. It stated that is not necessary to prove intention or negligence for liability to be made out.

== See also ==
- European Union law
