= SIAC Construction Ltd v Mayo County Council =

Irish Supreme Court case

SIAC Construction Ltd v The County Council of the County of Mayo
- Court: Supreme Court of Ireland
- Citation: SIAC Construction Ltd. v. Mayo County Council [2002] IESC 39 (9 May 2002)

Case history
- Appealed from: SIAC Construction Ltd v The County Council of the County of Mayo
- Appealed to: Supreme Court

Court membership
- Judge sitting: Keane C.J./ Denham J. / Murray J. / Hardiman J. / Fennelly J.

Case opinions
- The Supreme Court rejected the appeal and affirm the order of the High Court.

Keywords
- Invitation to tender, tender invitation to most economically advantageous, whether responded adequately explained decision to award contract to party other than lowest tenderer, discretion of awarding authority, Council Directive 71/305/E.E.C.

SIAC Construction Ltd v The County Council of the County of Mayo [2002] IESC 39, [2002] 3 IR 148 was a case in which the Supreme Court of Ireland ruled that, in exercising its margin of discretion in the area of public procurement, a contracting authority is required to respect the general principles of equality, transparency and objectivity.

== Background ==
In 1992, Mayo County Council advertised a public works contract using an "open procedure". In its advertisement, the Council stated that they not going to make a decision based on "lowest price only": the decision would be based on the "most economically advantageous tender". SIAC Construction tendered for the provision of a new sewerage system for town of Ballinrobe and submitted the lowest tender.

The Council employed a consulting engineer, who reported that an alternative tenderer, Pat Mulcair, might prove "at the end of the day to be the lowest". SIAC challenged the Council's decision before the High Court, stating that the Council acted in breach of public requirements in awarding the contract to another party.

On 11 October 1993, SIAC made an application to the High Court concerning of a decision made be the Mayo County Council not to award a construction contract. Judge Laffoy on 17 June 1997 decided that SIAC was not entitled to any relief.

At that point SIAC made an application to the Supreme Court. Subsequently, a reference was submitted to the European Court of Justice on 18 October 2001 to clarify the Article 29 of Council Directive 71/305/EEC of 26 July 1971.

== High Court decision ==
SIAC claimed that Mayo County Council were in breach of the European Communities Directive 71/305/EEC (as now consolidated in Directive 93/37/EEC) and/or the European Communities (Award of Public Works Contracts) Regulations, 1992 (S.I. No. 36 of 1992).

On 17 June 1997 High Court decide that SIAC is not entitled to any reliefs. Mayo County Council is not liable in damages to the SIAC Construction Ltd for breach of the 1971 Council Directive and 1992 Regulations.

== Court of Justice of the European Union ==
The Court of Justice of the European Union received a question concerning the interpretation of Article 29 of Council Directive 71/305/EEC of 26 July 1971 in relation to the procedures for the award of public works contracts between SIAC Construction Ltd and the County Council of Mayo.

The Court of Justice of the European Communities gave its judgment on 18 October 2001, where it was explained that Article 29 of Council Directive 71/305/EEC of 26 July 1971 could be interpreted for the benefit of County Council Mayo as to whether the criteria on the award was clearly stated in the contract notice and decision made on professional opinion based on objective factors. The European Court concluded that such an interpretation is a matter for the national court.

== Holding of the Supreme Court ==
SIAC was seeking to rely on the judgment of the European Court to pursue issues which were not dealt in the appeal of the High Court. County Council advertised tender "most economically advantageous" and not to be made on the basis of "lowest price only". SIAC submitted lowest price, therefore the consulting engineer employed by County Council reported that Pat Mulcair might prove "at the end of the day to be the lowest." SIAC claimed that the engineer did not acted objectively and his estimates were wrong. The Supreme Court ruled that County Council acted within the margin of discretion by choosing right tender. The engineer approached calculations correctly. The Supreme Court rejected the appeal and affirm the order of the High Court.
