= Incidental effect =

European Union law concept

Incidental effect is a concept in European Union law that allows the use of indirect effect of EU directives in private legal actions. While an individual cannot be sued for failure to comply with an EU directive, the state's failure to comply can be an incidental factor in a suit against an individual, where it will not impose legal obligations upon them.

The concept was defined by the European Court of Justice in Case C-194/94 CIA Security International SA v. Signalson SA and Securitel Sprl. CIA had attempted to market a burglar alarm in Belgium that was not compatible with Belgian technical specifications. However, the Belgian government had failed to report these specifications to the EU, as required by a directive in 1983. The court ruled that this constituted a substantial degradation of the effectiveness of the directive, which was intended to lower barriers to trade, and that the Belgian government's breach of the directive made the Belgian law inapplicable to individuals.

This concept was especially important in the field of contracts. The Court of Justice stated that a substantial procedural defect in implementing a directive could nullify a national law in the context of a contract, and gave national courts the power to interpret such legal problems based on their own contract law.

== See also ==
- Direct effect

== Bibliography ==
- Craig; De Burca (2007). EU Law: Text, Cases and Materials. Oxford University Press. ISBN 0-19-927389-8.
