= Plaumann & Co v Commission =

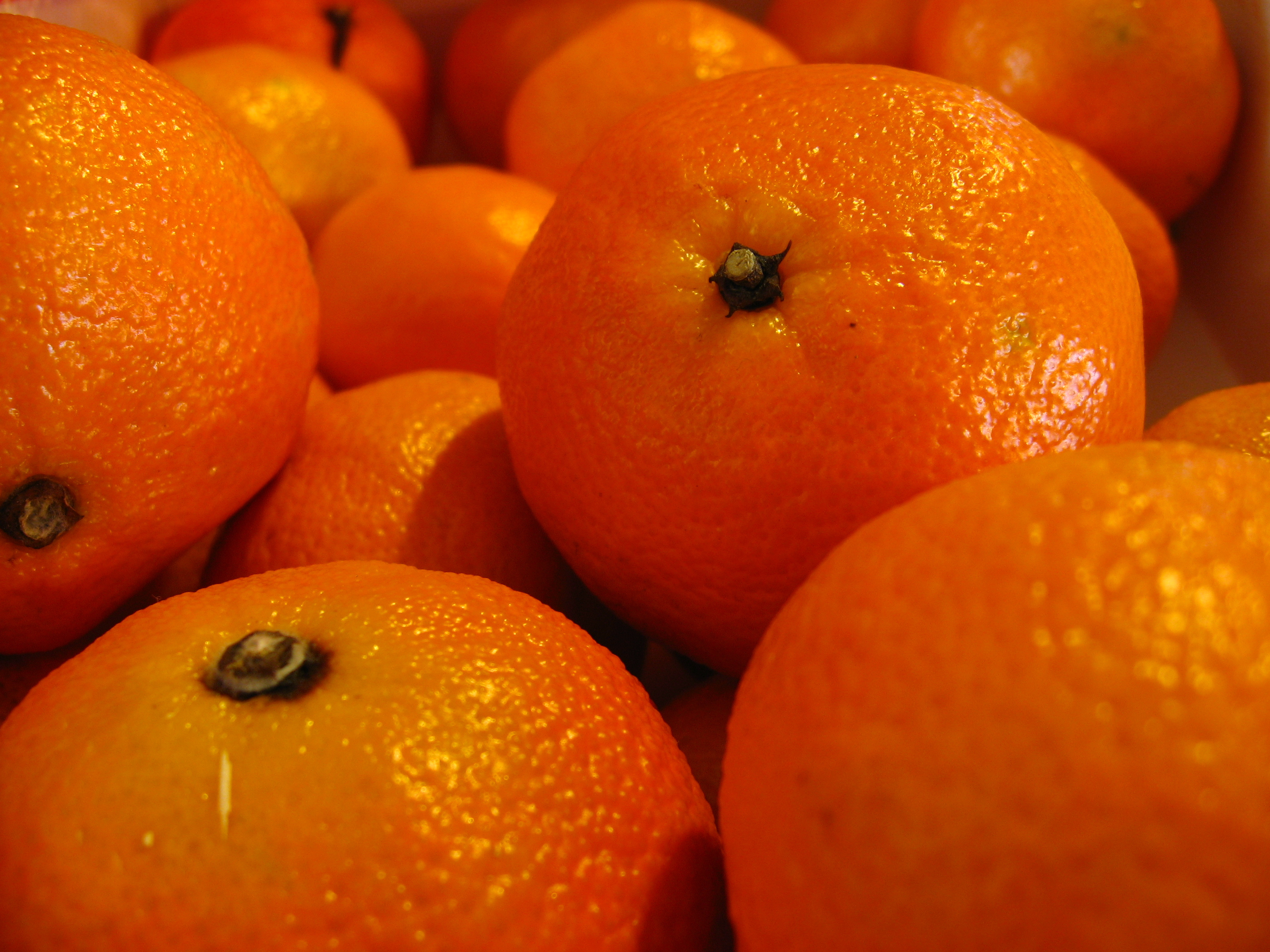
- Court: European Court of Justice
- Citation: (1963) Case 25/62

Keywords
- Free movement of goods

Plaumann & Co v Commission (1963) Case 25/62 is an EU law case, concerning judicial review in the European Union.

== Facts ==
Plaumann & Co imported clementines. The German authorities wished to suspend custom duties on imports, but the European Commission refused permission. Mr Plaumann sought judicial review of the Commission decision.

== Judgment ==
The Court of Justice held that Plaumann & Co had no standing for judicial review of the Commission decision because the firm was not "individually concerned".

Persons other than those to whom a decision is addressed may only claim to be individually concerned if that decision affects them by reason of certain attributes which are peculiar to them or by reason of circumstances in which they are differentiated from all other persons and by virtue of these factors distinguishes them individually just as in the case of the person addressed. In the present case the applicant is affected by the disputed Decision as an importer of clementines, that is to say, by reason of a commercial activity which may at any time be practised by any person and is not therefore such as to distinguish the applicant in relation to the contested Decision as in the case of the addressee.

== See also ==
- European Union law
