= Commission v Council =

EU law case

- Court: European Court of Justice
- Citations: (1971) Case 22/70, [1971] ECR 263

Keywords
- Legislation, legality

Commission v Council (1971) Case 22/70 is an EU law case, concerning the legality of legislative acts in the European Union.

== Facts ==
Relating to the European Road Transport Agreement, a Council ‘resolution’ settled the negotiating procedure for an upcoming conference. The Commission challenged the resolution as being against EU law, and the only way to do this was to ask for annulment of the ‘resolution’. Could it be a subject of such proceedings? TEEC article 190 (now TFEU article 288) at the time stated that regulations, directive and decisions were only valid if they stated the reasons on which they were based.

== Judgment ==
The Court of Justice held the list in (what is now) TFEU article 288 is not exhaustive, and Acts can be binding without falling into those categories. The resolution was a valid act outside the list.

== See also ==
- European Union law
