= Roquette Frères v Council =

Roquette Frères v Council (1980) C-138/79 was a ruling by the European Court of Justice which annulled a Regulation because the Council of the European Union failed to consult with the European Parliament.

Under Article 113 of the Treaty on the Functioning of the European Union bills covering areas such as home affairs, State aids and the harmonisation of indirect taxation must be passed via the First Special Legislative Procedure. Under this the bill starts with the European Commission and then go to the Council. The Council are required to consult with the Parliament, but do not need to follow the Parliament's opinion. This can be contrasted with the Second Special Legislative Procedure, under which parliament may accept or reject a proposal.

Roquette Frères v Council established that, although not binding, consultation with the Parliament is a mandatory part of the First Special Legislative Procedure.
