= Inuit Tapiriit Kanatami v Parliament and Council =

- Court: European Court of Justice
- Citation: (2013) C-583/11

Keywords
- Judicial review

Inuit Tapiriit Kanatami v Parliament and Council (2013) C-583/11 is an EU law case concerned with judicial review in the European Union.

== Facts ==
The claimants, Inuit Tapiriit Kanatami, a non-profit Canadian organisation representing over 50,000 Inuit, challenged a regulation of the European Parliament and Council on seal products. They further argued that to not be allowed a claim under TFEU art 263(4) would be inconsistent with the Charter of Fundamental Rights of the European Union, article 47, on an effective remedy.

The General Court rejected the application, because it challenged a regulation made as a legislative act under TFEU art 289, and this was not a 'regulatory' act under art 263(4). This meant the claimants would have to show individual as well as direct concern.

== Judgment ==
The Grand Chamber of the Court of Justice, upholding the decision of the General Court, held that a 'legislative act' is defined by the procedure used to adopt it, not on a functional basis.

53 Next, Article 263 TFEU makes a clear distinction between the right of the European Union institutions and Member States to institute proceedings, on the one hand, and the right of natural and legal persons to do so, on the other. Thus, the second paragraph of Article 263 TFEU grants the European Union institutions there listed and the Member States the right to challenge, by an action for annulment, the legality of any act covered by the first paragraph, and it is not a condition of that right being exercised that any legal interest in bringing proceedings is established (see the judgment of 5 September 2012 in Case C‑355/10 Parliament v Council [2012] ECR, paragraph 37 and the case‑law cited). Further, in accordance with the third paragraph of Article 263, the institutions and the Committee listed there may bring before the Court an action for annulment of those acts, provided that the action is brought for the purpose of protecting their prerogatives.

54 On the other hand, as regards the right of natural and legal persons to institute proceedings, the fourth paragraph of Article 263 TFEU provides that '[a]ny natural or legal person may, under the conditions laid down in the first and second paragraphs, institute proceedings against an act addressed to that person or which is of direct and individual concern to them, and against a regulatory act which is of direct concern to them and does not entail implementing measures'.

55 First, it must be stated that the first two limbs of the fourth paragraph of Article 263 TFEU correspond with those which were laid down, before the entry into force of the Treaty of Lisbon, by the EC Treaty, in the fourth paragraph of Article 230 thereof (see, in relation to the latter provision, Unión de Pequeños Agricultores v Council, paragraphs 34 to 37).

56 Given the reference to 'acts' in general, the subject matter of those limbs of Article 263 is any European Union act which produces binding legal effects (see, to that effect, Case 60/81 IBM v Commission [1981] ECR 2639, paragraph 9; Case C‑521/06 P Athinaïki Techniki v Commission [2008] ECR I‑5829, paragraph 29; Case C-322/09 P NDSHT v Commission [2010] ECR I‑11911, paragraph 45; and Joined Cases C‑463/10 P and C‑475/10 P Deutsche Post v Commission [2011] ECR I‑9639, paragraphs 36 to 38). That concept therefore covers acts of general application, legislative or otherwise, and individual acts. The second limb of the fourth paragraph of Article 263 TFEU specifies that if the natural or legal person who brings the action for annulment is not a person to whom the contested act is addressed, the admissibility of the action is subject to the condition that the act is of direct and individual concern to that person.

57 Secondly, by means of the Treaty of Lisbon, there was added to the fourth paragraph of Article 263 TFEU a third limb which relaxed the conditions of admissibility of actions for annulment brought by natural and legal persons. Since the effect of that limb is that the admissibility of actions for annulment brought by natural and legal persons is not subject to the condition of individual concern, it renders possible such legal actions against 'regulatory acts' which do not entail implementing measures and are of direct concern to the applicant.

58 As regards the concept of 'regulatory act', it is apparent from the third limb of the fourth paragraph of Article 263 TFEU that its scope is more restricted than that of the concept of 'acts' used in the first and second limbs of the fourth paragraph of Article 263 TFEU, in respect of the characterisation of the other types of measures which natural and legal persons may seek to have annulled. The former concept cannot, as the General Court held correctly in paragraph 43 of the order under appeal, refer to all acts of general application but relates to a more restricted category of such acts. To adopt an interpretation to the contrary would amount to nullifying the distinction made between the term 'acts' and 'regulatory acts' by the second and third limbs of the fourth paragraph of Article 263 TFEU.

59 Further, it must be observed that the fourth paragraph of Article 263 TFEU reproduced in identical terms the content of Article III-365(4) of the proposed treaty establishing a Constitution for Europe. It is clear from the travaux préparatoires relating to that provision that while the alteration of the fourth paragraph of Article 230 EC was intended to extend the conditions of admissibility of actions for annulment in respect of natural and legal persons, the conditions of admissibility laid down in the fourth paragraph of Article 230 EC relating to legislative acts were not however to be altered. Accordingly, the use of the term 'regulatory act' in the draft amendment of that provision made it possible to identify the category of acts which might thereafter be the subject of an action for annulment under conditions less stringent than previously, while maintaining 'a restrictive approach in relation to actions by individuals against legislative acts (for which the "of direct and individual concern" condition remains applicable)' (see, inter alia, Secretariat of the European Convention, Final report of the discussion circle on the Court of Justice of 25 March 2003, CONV 636/03, paragraph 22, and Cover note from the Praesidium to the Convention of 12 May 2003, CONV 734/03, p. 20).

60 In those circumstances, it must be held that that the purpose of the alteration to the right of natural and legal persons to institute legal proceedings, laid down in the fourth paragraph of Article 230 EC, was to enable those persons to bring, under less stringent conditions, actions for annulment of acts of general application other than legislative acts.

== See also ==
- European Union law
