= SA Roquette Frères v Council =

Roquette v Council
- Court: European Court of Justice
- Citation: (1980) Case 138/79, [1980] ECR 3333

Keywords
- Free movement of goods

SA Roquette Frères v Council (1980) Case 138/79 is an EU law case, concerning the free movement of services in the European Union.

== Facts ==
The Council sent a proposal to the European Parliament in March 1979 (when the Parliament still only had a consulting role) regarding a measure that was to come into force on 1 July 1979. It asked for a reply in April. The Parliament rejected it, meaning the proposal was to go back to the committee for reconsideration. This would take longer than April. The Parliament would have convened an extraordinary session, but the Council made no request, and purported to adopt the measure on 25 June 1979 against the Parliament's wishes. The measure was challenged by a company, SA Roquette Frères, on the ground that the European Parliament was not properly consulted.

== Judgment ==
The Court of Justice held consulting required more steps than the Council had taken. The measure was void because the Council should have requested the extraordinary session of the Parliament.

34 ... observance of that requirement implies that the Parliament has expressed its opinion. It is impossible to take the view that the requirement is satisfied by the Council’s simply asking for the opinion.

== See also ==
- European Union law
