= Pammer and Alpenhof cases =

- European Court of Justice

Decided 7 December 2010
- Full case name: Peter Pammer v Reederei Karl Schlüter GmbH & Co. KG (C-585/08) and Hotel Alpenhof GesmbH v Oliver Heller (C-144/09).
- Case: C-585/08 & C-144/09
- CelexID: 62008CJ0585
- ECLI: ECLI:EU:C:2010:740
- Case type: Reference for a preliminary ruling
- Chamber: Full court
- Language of proceedings: German
- Nationality of parties: Austrian

Court composition
- Advocate General; Verica Trstenjak

Pammer v Karl Schlütter GmbH & Co. KG C-585/08 and Hotel Alpenhof v Oliver Heller C-144/09 are European Union private law cases from 2010, concerning consumer protection, and the jurisdiction of transnational internet and consumer transactions.

== Facts ==
=== Pammer v. Karl Schlütter GmbH & Co. KG ===
Mr. Pammer, an Austrian citizen, made an online booking for a cruise, operated by the German company Karl Schlütter GmbH & Co. KG, from Italy to Asia. Upon arrival at Triest, Italy, he found out that the facilities offered were far below what was advertised. Instead of the double cabin which he had booked, only a single cabin was available, and despite what the website advertised, there was no outdoor swimming pool, no fitness room, no working television and no seating or lounging facilities on deck on the freighter. Due to this, Mr Pammer didn’t embark the ship, but he was only given a partial refund (€3,216 of the €8,510 total). This prompted Pammer to sue for the non-refunded remainder.

=== Hotel Alpenhof GesmbH v Oliver Heller ===
Mr. Heller, a German citizen, booked a room, via email, in the Austrian hotel Alpenhof GesmbH. He did not pay the bill for his stay. The hotel sued Mr. Heller for the cost of his stay.

== Procedural history ==
=== Pammer v Karl Schlütter GmbH & Co. KG ===
Mr. Pammer sued for the payment of the remaining €5,294 at an Austrian court. The court of first instance held that it had both international and territorial jurisdiction. It ruled that it was a consumer contract and the website was adapted to the German marketplace. The court of appeal ruled that the lower court did not have international jurisdiction and dismissed the action. Mr. Pammer did not accept this decision, and brought the action to the Supreme Court of Austria. The supreme court brought it to the European Court of Justice for a preliminary ruling.

=== Hotel Alpenhof GesmbH v Oliver Heller ===
Hotel Alpenhof GesmbH sued Mr Oliver Heller for €5,248.30 for the provision of hotel services, at an Austrian court. The defendant objected that the court lacked international and territorial jurisdiction. The first and second instance courts followed this argument and dismissed the action. The claimant then appealed to the Supreme Court of Austria on a point of law. The Supreme Court brought it to the European Court of Justice for a preliminary ruling.

=== Questions to European Court of Justice ===
1. Does a “voyage by freighter” constitute package travel for the purposes of Article 15, paragraph 3 of Regulation (EC) No 44/2001 (Brussels I Regulation)? (Pammer)

2. Is the fact that a website of the party with whom a consumer has concluded a contract can be consulted on the internet sufficient to justify a finding that an activity is being “directed” within the meaning of Article 15, paragraph 1 c) of Regulation (EC) No 44/2001?’ (Pammer & Alpenhof)

== Judgement ==
=== Parties' arguments ===
First Question:
In the opinion of Mr Pammer, the Austrian, Czech, Italian, Luxembourg and Polish Governments and the European Commission a contract for a cruise, which includes accommodation, several days' duration trip and special services falls of Article 15 (3) of Regulation No 44/2001. Because of this, the trip is a tourist travel contract and Mr. Pammer has the rights of Article 16 - 17 of Regulation No 44/2001.
Second Question:
In the opinion of Mr Pammer, Mr Heller, the Austrian, Czech, Italian and Polish Governments and the Commission pointed out that the purpose of Article 15 (1)(c) of Regulation No 44/2001 is to protect consumers. They claim a wide interpretation of the concept of activities directed to that Member State.
Hotel Alpenhof and the Luxembourg, Netherlands and United Kingdom Governments are against of a wide interpretation of the concept of the directing of activities.
The Commission also emphasises that the national court must decide in the light of all the circumstances of the individual case whether an undertaking directs its activities to the Member State in which the consumer is domiciled. “It argues that the following circumstances, amongst others, are of importance:

- the type of business activities conducted and the appearance of the website,
- the provision of a telephone number with the international dialling code,
- a link to a route planner and
- the ability to select ‘look-and-book’ whereby it is possible to enquire as to the availability of rooms during a particular period.”

=== Opinion of the court ===
A contract concerning a voyage by freighter, like the one of Mr. Pammer, is a tourist travel contract, in the meaning of Article 15 (3) Regulation (EC) No 44/2001, which gives the consumer the possibilities of Article 16 - 17 Regulation (EC) No 44/2001.

The court decided that the national courts have to decide whether a website is "directed" within the meaning of Article 15, paragraph 1 c) of Regulation (EC) No 44/2001 or not. There is also the following list, which is not exhaustive, for interpretation if the trader’s activity is directed to the Member State of the consumer’s domicile:

- namely the international nature of the activity,
- mention of itineraries from other Member States for going to the place where the trader is established,
- use of a language or a currency other than the language or currency generally used in the Member State in which the trader is established with the possibility of making and confirming the reservation in that other language,
- mention of telephone numbers with an international code,
- outlay of expenditure on an internet referencing service (e. g. Google) in order to facilitate access to the trader’s site or that of its intermediary by consumers domiciled in other Member States,
- use of a top-level domain name other than that of the Member State in which the trader is established, and
- mention of an international clientele composed of customers domiciled in various Member States. It is for the national courts to ascertain whether such evidence exists.

The following matters are no indications:

- the pure accessibility of the trader’s or the intermediary’s website in the Member State in which the consumer is domiciled
- the mention of an email address and of other contact details, or of use of a language or a currency which are the language and/or currency generally used in the Member State in which the trader is established.

== Significance ==
Firms (or persons) who sell products or services through the internet have to decide whether they want to sell just in the Member State they operate (live) in, or in other countries as well. When selling to customers from a foreign Member State, these firms and persons will have to consider the ECJ judgement.

Considering this judgement, firms should be aware of the possibility of facing legal proceedings in the customer's country.

The decision deals with the Regulation (EC) No 44/2001 (Brussels I) and which court of justice is competent. Due to the principle of legal certainty in the EU, the Rome I, Rome II, and Brussels I regulations are uniformly interpreted. That means, when an activity is "directed" into another country, the consumer protection articles of Rome I and Rome II are applicable.

Note: Regulation (EC) No 864/2007 of 11 July 2007 applies to non-contractual obligations (the "Rome II Regulation"), and Regulation (EC) No 593/2008 of 17 June 2008 applies to contractual obligations (the "Rome I Regulation" and, together with the Rome II Regulation, the "Rome Regulations").
