= Anti-suit injunction =

Order to restrain parallel action

An anti-suit injunction is an order issued by a court or arbitral tribunal that prevents an opposing party from commencing or continuing a legal proceeding in another jurisdiction or forum. It is among the means available to address the problem of parallel proceedings or forum shopping, whether they are current or anticipated.

== Case law ==
In The Angelic Grace (1995) the English High Court granted an anti-suit injunction preventing a claimant pursuing litigation in Italy when arbitration proceedings had been agreed and already commenced within England and Wales.

In recent years many jurisdictions have placed a high standard to obtain when seeking an anti-suit injunction, such as where the proceedings are "oppressive or vexatious". Furthermore, in proceedings prior to the 2015 milestone decision in the case of "Gazprom" OAO v Lietuvos Respublika, often called the Gazprom case, anti-suit injunctions were considered inapplicable in litigation or arbitration among EU member states. The issue being addressed concerned was whether it applied to arbitration, being excluded from the Brussels Convention. This was resolved in the Gazprom case and the specifics of the exclusion were covered in recital 12 of Brussels recast, therefore the current position is that anti-suit injunctions can be issued by EU arbitration tribunals and upheld by Courts of Justice of EU member states.

== See also ==
- Non-suit
