= Amministrazione delle Finanze dello Stato v Simmenthal SpA =

Legal case concerning conflict between national and EU law

Amministrazione delle Finanze v Simmenthal SpA
- Court: European Court of Justice
- Citation: (1978) Case 106/77, [1978] ECR 629

Keywords
- Employee

Amministrazione delle Finanze v Simmenthal SpA (1978) Case 106/77 is an EU law case, concerning the conflict of law between a national legal system and European Union law.

== Facts ==
Simmenthal SpA imported beef from France into Italy. Italy imposed a public health inspection fee for the meat crossing the border under an Italian Law of 1970. This conflicted with European Community Regulations from 1964 and 1968.

Italian courts heard argument that Italian law must prevail because it was passed after the Regulations, and must be applied by the Italian courts until the law was declared unconstitutional. It referred the question of what to do in a case of conflict to the ECJ. The Attorney General Reischl gave an Opinion suggesting that timing of the Italian law was irrelevant, and EU law was supreme.

== Judgment ==
The ECJ held that the national court had a duty to give full effect to Community provisions, even if a conflicting national law was adopted later. It began its opinion by reaffirming the doctrine of direct effect, established in Van Gend en Loos v Nederlandse Administratie der Belastingen.

Para. 14: Direct applicability in such circumstances means that rules of [Union] law must be fully and uniformly applied in all the Member States from the date of their entry into force and for so long as they continue in force.

The ECJ additionally reiterated its claims of legal supremacy in Costa v ENEL, underscoring the precedence of EU law over national law.

Para. 17: Furthermore, in accordance with the principle of the precedence of Community law, [Union] provisions and measures not only by their entry into force render automatically inapplicable any conflicting provision of current national law but […] also preclude the valid adoption of new national legislative measures to the extent to which they would be incompatible with Community provisions.

The ECJ concluded by formulating a new principle, namely that national courts have an obligation to “set aside” all statutes conflicting with EU law. National courts require no authorization from legislatures to do so, but rather are empowered to perform any necessary review independently.

Para. 21: It follows from the foregoing that every national Court must, in a case within its jurisdiction, apply [Union] law in its entirety and protect rights which the latter confers on individuals and must accordingly set aside a provision of national law which may conflict with it, whether prior or subsequent to the [Union] rule. Para. 24: It is not necessary for the court to request or await a prior setting aside of such provision by legislative or other constitutional means.

== Significance ==
The “setting aside” principle described by the Simmenthal decision has come to be known as “disapplication.” Subsequent case-law has extended the mandate of disapplication to all bodies established under national law to enforce individuals’ EU rights, even when the exercise of such authority undermines local constitutional rules. Because Simmenthal granted the power of judicial review to all national courts and tribunals, its disapplication principle indirectly overturned parliamentary sovereignty in Great Britain, the Netherlands, and other countries whose judiciaries had previously lacked authority to curtail majoritarian parliaments.

== See also ==
- European Union law
- Primacy of European Union law
