= Costa v ENEL =

1964 European Court of Justice decision

- European Court of Justice

Decided 15 July 1964
- Full case name: Flaminio Costa v E.N.E.L.
- Case: 6/64
- CelexID: 61964J0006
- ECLI: ECLI:EU:C:1964:66
- Case type: Reference for a preliminary ruling
- Chamber: Full court
- Nationality of parties: Italy
- Procedural history: Giudice conciliatore di Milano, Sezione I, ordinanza del 16 January 1964 21 January 1964 (RG 1907/63)

Ruling
- As a subsequent unilateral measure cannot take precedence over community law, the questions put by the Giudice Conciliatore, Milan, are admissible in so far as they relate in this case to the interpretation of provisions of the EEC treaty

Court composition
- Judge Rapporteur; Robert Lecourt
- Advocate General; Maurice Lagrange

Flaminio Costa v ENEL (1964) Case 6/64 is a landmark decision of the European Court of Justice which established the primacy of European Union law (then Community law) over the laws of its member states.

== Facts ==
Flaminio Costa was a Milanese lawyer as well as a user and shareholder of Edisonvolta, a municipal electricity company nationalized by the Italian government in the context of the nationalization of the electricity sector at the end of 1962. Costa was assisted by Gian Galeazzo Stendardi, a Milanese lawyer, who wrote some pioneering works on Italian Constitutional Justice and the relationship between Community Law and Italian Law. Costa and Stendardi opposed electricity nationalization for political reasons.

When Costa received his first electricity bill from ENEL, the monopolist established by the electricity nationalization law, he refused to pay it, claiming that ENEL had not validly taken over his electricity supply contract with Edisonvolta, because the nationalisation law infringed both the Italian Constitution and the EEC Treaty.

In the ensuing lawsuit before the Justice of Peace of Milan (giudice conciliatore), Costa asked that court to refer the case to the Italian Constitutional Court and to the European Court of Justice. However, the Justice of Peace hearing his case, Antonio Carones, only referred the matter to the Italian Constitutional Court.

The Italian Constitutional Court gave its judgement on 24 February 1964, ruling that while Article 11 of the Italian Constitution enabled the Parliament to adopt laws entailing limitations of sovereignty necessary to join international organizations such as the EEC, those laws did not enjoy a special rank in the hierarchy of legal sources. Therefore, the ordinary rule of statutory interpretation, granting precedence to the subsequent law (lex posterior derogat legi anteriori/priori), would apply in case of conflict. As a result, the Treaty of Rome, which was incorporated into Italian law in 1957, could not prevail over the electricity nationalisation law enacted in 1962.

In the meantime, Costa had challenged the second electricity bill he had received from ENEL before another Justice of Peace of Milan, Vittorio Emanuele Fabbri. The latter referred the case to the Italian Constitutional Court again and, for the first time, to the European Court of Justice, asking the latter whether the nationalisation law was consistent with the provisions of the EEC Treaty on commercial monopolies, the right of establishment, competition, and state aids.

Relying on the judgment of the Italian Constitutional Court, the Italian government argued that the preliminary reference to the European Court of Justice was inadmissible, as the giudice conciliatore had to apply the nationalisation statute even if it conflicted with the EEC Treaty, thus obviating the need for a ruling by the European Court of Justice on the interpretation of that Treaty.

== Judgment ==
The ECJ dismissed the inadmissibility plea, noting that even though it could not rule on the consistency between Italian law and Community law, it could assist the referring court in doing so, by providing the following authoritative interpretation of the four provisions of the EEC Treaty mentioned in the order for reference:

As opposed to ordinary international treaties, the Treaty instituting the E.E.C. has created its own order, which was integrated with the national order of the member-States the moment the Treaty came into force; as such it is binding upon them. In fact, by creating a Community of unlimited duration, having its own institutions, its own personality and its own capacity in law, apart from having international standing and more particularly, real powers resulting from a limitation of competence or a transfer of powers from the States to the Community, the member-States, albeit within limited spheres, have restricted their sovereign rights and created a body of law applicable both to their nationals and to themselves. The reception, within the laws of each member-State, of provisions having a Community source, and more particularly of the terms and of the spirit of the Treaty, has as a corollary the impossibility, for the member-State, to give preference to a unilateral and subsequent measure against a legal order accepted by them on a basis of reciprocity.

[...]

It follows from all these observations that the law stemming from the treaty, an independent source of law, could not, because of its special and original nature, be overridden by domestic legal provisions, however framed, without being deprived of its character as community law and without the legal basis of the community itself being called into question.

On the merits, the ECJ found that the provisions of the EEC Treaty on competition and State aids mentioned in the order for reference had no direct effect and thus could not be invoked by individuals wishing to challenge national laws that allegedly infringed those provisions. The ECJ interpreted the right of establishment rather narrowly, thus suggesting that the nationalisation law was consistent with it as long as it did not entail discrimination on the basis of nationality. The ECJ instead left to the referring court to establish whether the nationalisation law was consistent with the provision of the EEC Treaty on commercial monopolies.

== Significance ==
This groundbreaking case established the principle of supremacy in EU law, which is an independent source of law that cannot be overridden by domestic laws.

Article I-6 of the proposed European Constitution stated: "The Constitution and law adopted by the institutions of the Union in exercising competences conferred on it shall have primacy over the law of the Member States". The constitution was never ratified, after being rejected in referendums in France and the Netherlands in 2005.

The Treaty of Lisbon of 13 December 2007 did not include the article on primacy, but instead included a Declaration concerning primacy recalling the Costa v. ENEL judgment.

French Judge Robert Lecourt, who was on the Court from 1962 to 1976, would later argue these decisions "added nothing" other than to "give effect" to the treaties, an effect he felt was "commanded" by their being.

== See also ==
- Direct effect
- Factortame
- Thoburn v Sunderland City Council
- Van Gend en Loos v Nederlandse Administratie der Belastingen
