= Claus Christian Gulmann =

Danish judge at European Court of Justice

Claus Christian Gulmann (born 1942) is a Danish judge who served as Advocate General and Judge at the European Court of Justice.

He has held the following positions:

- Official at the Ministry of Justice
- Legal Secretary to Judge Max Sørensen
- Professor of Public International Law and Dean of the Law School of the University of Copenhagen
- Private practice
- Chairman and member of arbitral tribunals
- Member of Administrative Appeal Tribunal
- Advocate General at the European Court of Justice (7 October 1991 - 6 October 1994)
- Judge at the Court of Justice (7 October 1994 - 10 January 2006).

== See also ==
- List of members of the European Court of Justice
