= Von Colson v Land Nordrhein-Westfalen =

- European Court of Justice

Submitted 6 December 1982 Decided 10 April 1984
- Full case name: Sabine von Colson and Elisabeth Kamann v Land Nordrhein-Westfalen
- Case: C-14/83
- CelexID: 61983CJ0014
- ECLI: ECLI:EU:C:1984:153

Court composition
- Judge Rapporteur; Lord Mackenzie Stuart
- Advocate General; France Simone Rozès

Instruments cited
- Equal Treatment Directive (Directive 76/207/EEC)

Keywords
- Direct effect, Equal treatment

Von Colson v Land Nordrhein-Westfalen (1984) Case 14/83 is an EU law case, concerning the conflict of law between a national legal system and European Union law.

== Facts ==
Sabine Von Colson and Elisabeth Kamann were German social workers who applied to work in men's prisons run by the State of North Rhine-Westphalia. Both were rejected on the basis that they were women.

Von Colson and Kamann appealed the decision at the Arbeitsgericht (Labour Tribunal). Under European Communities law, the Equal Treatment Directive (76/207/EEC) required member states to give effect to principle of equal treatment and obliged them to provide a legal remedy. The claimants argued that they had a directly effective right to demand that the court order the employer to appoint them. Instead of this or compensation, they were awarded only "reliance losses" as a remedy, equivalent to the travel costs they incurred in going to the interview (7.20 DM).

== Judgment ==
Lack of precision in the directive prevented it from having direct effect, but the Court directed that the national legislation be interpreted in light of the directive. Ultimately, the claimants were not entitled to a remedy that guaranteed their appointment to the post from which they had been discriminated against, but the member state would be liable to provide a remedy. Compensation for the discrimination suffered could be carried out in several ways, including via the payment of damages. The Court also required the remedy to be sufficient to ensure the effectiveness of Community (now EU) law.

23. Although... full implementation of the directive does not require any specific form of sanction for unlawful discrimination, it does entail that that sanction be such as to guarantee real and effective judicial protection.

26. ... national courts are required to interpret their national law in the light of the wording and the purpose of the Directive in order to achieve the result referred to in the third paragraph of Article 189.

28. ... if a Member State chooses to penalize breaches of that prohibition by the award of compensation, then in order to ensure that it is effective and that it has a deterrent effect, that compensation must in any event be adequate in relation to the damage sustained and must therefore amount to more than purely nominal compensation such as, for example, the reimbursement only of the expenses incurred in connection with the application. It is for the national court to interpret and apply the legislation adopted for the implementation of the directive in conformity with the requirements of Community law, in so far as it is given discretion to do so under national law.

== See also ==
- European Union law
