= Advocate general =

Senior officer of the law

An advocate general of a state is a senior officer of the law. In some common law and hybrid jurisdictions the officer performs the function of a legal advisor to the government, analogous to attorneys general in other common law and hybrid jurisdictions. By contrast, in the European Union and some continental European jurisdictions, the officer is a neutral legal advisor to the courts.

== India ==
In India, an advocate general is a legal advisor to a state government. The post is created by the Constitution of India and corresponds to that of Attorney General of India at the central-level. The Governor of each state shall appoint a person who is qualified to be appointed judges in high court. There is no fixed term of office and no upper-age-limit mentioned for the Advocate general.

== Pakistan ==
In Pakistan an advocate general of the Province of the Punjab is a constitutional post and is an authority duly appointed under Article 140 of the Constitution of Islamic Republic of Pakistan. A person who is qualified to be appointed a Judge of the High Court is appointed the Advocate General for the province. He is the principal law officer of the Province.

The Advocate General and his office defends and protects the interest of the Provincial government and gives invaluable legal guidance to the provincial government in formulation of its policy and execution of its decision. Advocate-General of the Punjab is also ex officio chairman of the Punjab Bar Council.

The office of the Advocate General is directly connected with the High Court of the province. Pre-independence (1947) the High Court of judicature for the premises of Punjab and Delhi was established at Lahore and was called the High Court of Judicature at Lahore. After independence of Pakistan, the High Court at Lahore ceased to have jurisdiction over Delhi and the then East Punjab. On 14 August 1947 the High Court (Lahore) Order, 1947, preserved the continuance of the High Court at Lahore with all rights, powers and privileges as hitherto enjoyed and possessed by it before the appointed day. The Governor-General of the Dominion of Pakistan became the substitute of the Crown in matters of appointment etc. of Judges of the Lahore High Court.

== United Kingdom ==
=== England and Wales ===
The concept of an "advocate general" aligns more naturally with civil law systems than with common law systems. In England the archetypal common law jurisdiction no such office exists, nor is there an equivalent figure who addresses and advises the court.

However, England does have an Attorney General, who serves one of the Law Officers of the Crown and whose duty is to advise the Crown and Cabinet on the law. His deputy is the Solicitor General, who serves the same function.

=== Scotland ===
Historically, the United Kingdom Government was advised on matters of Scots Law by the Lord Advocate but following the Scotland Act 1998 and the establishment of the Scottish Parliament the Lord Advocate became an adviser to, and a part of, the Scottish Government.

It was necessary to create a post to advise the British Government in Westminster. Thus, the new post of Advocate General for Scotland was created. The advocate general's role differs from that formerly held by the Lord Advocate in that they are only charged with advising the UK Government on matters pertaining to Scots law, the Lord Advocate having retained his responsibility as the chief public prosecutor in Scotland and head of the Crown Office and Procurator Fiscal Service on his transfer to the Scottish Government.

=== Northern Ireland ===
The position of Advocate General for Northern Ireland was created following the devolution of policing and justice powers to the Northern Ireland Assembly on 12 April 2010. The Attorney General for Northern Ireland reports to the Northern Ireland Executive, and, accordingly, the Advocate General advises the UK Government on matters of Northern Ireland law. The post is held, ex officio, by the Attorney General for England and Wales.

== Other European jurisdictions ==
The position of advocate general is well established in the French, Dutch, and some other continental European legal systems, where higher courts are assisted by these legal officers. They are not advocates representing clients in courts. They are not judges either, although they are full members of the courts. They mainly offer legal advice to judges on the cases being tried. They may also have a prosecution role, depending on countries and on the nature of cases (criminal or civil).

The position of advocate general (avocat général) already existed in the French legal system before the French Revolution, when they were found in the then higher courts (parlements, cours des aides, etc.) and proposed legal solutions to the judges in cases involving the state, the church, the general public, communities, or minors. Since the French Revolution, they are found in the Court of Cassation, the Court of Audit, the Courts of Appeal, and the Assize Courts. They have more of a prosecution role than before the French Revolution, especially in the Assize Courts, in which people accused of felonies are tried.

=== European Union ===
The Court of Justice of the European Union (CJEU) consists of one judge from each member state, assisted by eleven advocates general whose role is to consider the written and oral submissions to the court in every case that raises a new point of law, and deliver an impartial opinion to the court on the legal solution. Although the Advocates General are full members of the court, they do not take part in the court's deliberations, and the Advocate General's opinion is not binding on the court. Although the court reaches the same solution as the Advocate General more often than not, it cannot usually be stated that the Advocate General's opinion has been 'followed' in any given case, because the court may have reached the same conclusion via different legal reasoning. The role of Advocate General is created by Article 19(2) of the Treaty on European Union and Articles 253 and 254 of the Treaty on the Functioning of the European Union.

=== Benelux Court of Justice ===
When the Benelux Court of Justice answers requests for a preliminary ruling, it also first considers the advice of an advocate general. The court has three, one from each participating country (Netherlands, Belgium, Luxembourg), taken from the procureurs-general of each country.

== See also ==
- Advocate-General of Western Australia
- List of members of the European Court of Justice
- Judge Advocate General
