= Judge rapporteur =

Judge acting as rapporteur for the case

A judge rapporteur or judge-rapporteur is a judge in a panel or chamber of judges who is nominated to write the case report as rapporteur for other judges, usually in European courts.

== European Court of Human Rights ==
In the European Court of Human Rights (ECHR), the term judge rapporteur is defined under Rule 1(k), 48 and 49 of 'Rules of Court'.

- According to Rule 48, when the case is on inter-state applications, the chamber of the court constituted of seven judges for the case designates one or more than one judge among the chamber as judge rapporteur, to write a report or other necessary materials on adimissibility of the case. These report and materials are originally for other judges at the chamber. Shortly, the judge rapporteur in the ECHR under Rule 48 of the Rules of the Court oversees whether the case should be dismissed in preliminary stage.
- According to Rule 49, when the case is on individual applications, the president of the section of the court for the case designates one judge of the section as judge rapporteur, to write a report or other necessary materials as memorandum which examines facts and subject-matter jurisdiction inside the court. Hence, the judge rapporteur in the ECHR under Rule 49 of the Rules of the Court oversees who should handle the case inside the court.

== European Court of Justice ==
In the European Court of Justice (ECJ), the term judge-rapporteur is defined under article 15 of the Rules of Procedure of the Court of Justice. According to article 15(1), a judge-rapporteur in the ECJ is the judge chosen to act as rapporteur in a case, designated by the president of the ECJ. Since there is always only one judge-rapporteur in one case, judicial assistants named 'assistant rapporteur' under article 17(2)(b) of the Rule can be appointed to assist the judge-rapporteur.

Thejudge-rapporteur in the ECJ writes the preliminary report of the case regarding who should handle the case, and how the case should be handled in the pre-trial written stage under article 59 of the Rules, including issues about whether legal aid is needed under article 116. The proposal of the judge-rapporteur is considered seriously inside the court, as article 33 of the Rule requires the judge-rapporteur cannot be abstained from the deliberation of the case. Following, each of judgments and orders of the ECJ should contain information about who was judge-rapporteur of the case according to article 87(d) and 89(e) of the Rules.

== See also ==
- Rapporteur
- Rapporteur Judge
- European Court of Human Rights
- European Court of Justice
