= Karel Jungwiert =

Judge of the European Court of Human Rights in respect of the Czech Republic
- Incumbent
- Assumed office 1993
- Preceded by: Office created
- Succeeded by: Aleš Pejchal

Personal details
- Born: 1 November 1944 (age 81) Vlkovce, Czechoslovakia
- Education: Charles University in Prague
- Profession: Lawyer

Karel Jungwiert (born 1 November 1944) is a Czech lawyer, and was the Czech Republic's nominated Judge of the European Court of Human Rights in respect of the Czech Republic from the country's accession to the Council of Europe in 1993. His term at the Court ended on 31 October 2012.

== Early life ==
Jungwiert was born in Vlkovce (a village near Benešov). He obtained a Doctorate in Law from the Charles University in Prague, the oldest and largest university in the Czech Republic in 1969, and was admitted as a barrister in 1974.

== Career ==
Jungwiert practised at the Bar until 1989, and in 1990 was appointed Head of the Secretariat of the Federal Assembly of Czechoslovakia. In 1993, the State of Czechoslovakia was dissolved, and Jungwiert became a judge of the Supreme Court of the newly formed Czech Republic. Later that year, he was elected the judge in respect of the Czech Republic at the European Court of Human Rights. His term at the Court ended on 31 October 2012.

== See also ==
- European Court of Human Rights
- List of judges of the European Court of Human Rights
