= Real Madrid Club de Fútbol v Le Monde =

- European Court of Justice

Submitted 11 October 2022
- Full case name: Real Madrid Club de Fútbol, AE v EE, Société Éditrice du Monde SA
- Case: 633/22
- ECLI: ECLI:EU:C:2024:127

Court composition
- Advocate General; Maciej Szpunar

Real Madrid Club de Fútbol, AE v EE, Société Éditrice du Monde SA (Case 633/22) is an ongoing case of the European Court of Justice (ECJ). The case, brought by the Spanish football club Real Madrid, alleges that French newspaper Le Monde defamed the club by publishing an article linking the club to a doctor known for doping. Although Spanish courts have awarded the football club damages, French courts have refused to uphold their judgment in the name of protecting freedom of the press. The French courts have sent a request for a preliminary ruling from the ECJ on whether the principle of mutual recognition of judgments outweighs the freedom of the press and freedom of expression. The ECJ will seek to reconcile the decisions of two national courts and determine the role of rights within the principle of mutual recognition.

== Facts ==
In 2006, the French newspaper Le Monde published an article that claimed links existed between the football club Real Madrid and Dr. Eufemiano Fuentès, the doctor behind the Operación Puerto doping scandal. The article included the caption "Dopage: le football après le cyclisme" ("first cycling, now football") and a cartoon "depicting a cyclist dressed in the colours of the Spanish flag, surrounded by little footballers and syringes," implying Real Madrid was engaged in doping.

The football club sued the newspaper and journalist for damages "based on harm done to their honor. Critics have considered this case a SLAPP suit intended to censor journalism unfavorable to the club.

== Judgments ==
=== Spanish Courts ===
Juzgado de Primera Instancia no19 de Madrid (Court of First Instance No 19, Madrid) ruled in February 2009 that the article was "defamatory and harmed the club's reputation." The court ordered Le Monde to pay €300,000 to Real Madrid. Le Monde appealed to the Audiencia Provincial de Madrid (Provincial Court, Madrid), which agreed with the lower court. The Tribunal Supremo (Supreme Court, Spain) dismissed a further appeal in February 2014.

Following appeals, the damages increased to €390,000, including interest.

=== French Courts ===
In February 2018, the tribunal de grande instance de Paris (Regional Court, Paris) ordered Le Monde to pay Real Madrid. The Regional Court issued this ruling in line with Regulation (EC) No 44/2001, which orders that "a judgment given in a Member State and enforceable in that State shall be enforced in another Member State" a principle known as mutual recognition. In September 2020, however, the cour d'appel de Paris (Court of Appeal, Paris) ruled that the penalties have a "deterrent effect on the involvement of journalists and media organisations in the public discussion of matters of community interest, thereby breaching freedom of the press and freedom of expression" found in Article 11 of the Charter of Fundamental Rights of the European Union. The Court of Appeal found that Le Monde is not required to pay the damages ordered by the Spanish courts.

Real Madrid appealed this decision to the Cour de cassation (Court of Cassation, France), which sent a preliminary reference to the ECJ asking if the freedom of the press outlined in the Charter of Fundamental Rights outweighs the principle of mutual recognition of judgments.

=== European Court of Justice ===
This case is still pending in the Court of Justice of the European Union. However, the non-binding opinion of Advocate General Maciej Szpunar was published in February 2024, arguing that the "freedom of the press is an essential principle of the EU legal order, the manifest breach of which may constitute a ground for refusal of enforcement."

Szpunar finds that even under the strengthened requirement "without the need for any special procedure" to recognize other member states judgments set up under Regulation (EU) No 1215/2012, a member state "must refuse or revoke enforcement where it would give rise to a manifest breach of freedom of expression." The Spanish ruling in this case "constitutes a manifest and disproportionate breach of freedom of the press."

Szpunar also argues that the damages, in this case, were exorbitant, "several dozen times the standard minimum salary in the Member State concerned," and that "damages which media companies are ordered to pay must not be such as to threaten their economic foundations."

Szpunar, however, did not find the arguments based on Article 11 of the Charter of Fundamental Rights of the European Union convincing enough to outweigh the principle of mutual recognition. Instead, he argues that the ECJ must look to the protections of the European Convention on Human Rights (ECHR). He writes that "as there is little scope under Article 10(2) of the ECHR for restrictions on freedom of expression in the fields of political speech and matters of public interest," the ECJ must use the European Court of Human Rights (ECtHR) case-law and uphold the rights of Le Monde and its journalists as the ECJ "cannot disregard the need to provide protection at least equivalent to that offered by the ECHR."

== Significance ==
This case demonstrates a potential new view for ECJ towards the ECHR. In former cases, the court had invoked the ECHR on occasions such as in Melloni v Ministerio and Aranyosi and Căldăraru when adjudicating the human rights standards of the European Arrest Warrant. However, this case can potentially align ECJ and ECHR jurisprudence more clearly. The Advocate General's opinion prioritizes preserving an ECHR right over a standard practice of EU law, demonstrating the ECJ's potential novel willingness to hold other international obligations over those of the EU. This case will also likely set a precedent for freedom of speech in the context of the EU principle of mutual recognition, which has not been previously adjudicated.

The Advocate General suggests that human rights obligations trump standard EU legal procedures. This might upend the long-standing might upend "the long-standing Bosphorus presumption" that states must fully align themselves with EU law at the expense of their commitments to any other international agreements. This case opens an opportunity for other international legal systems to be considered more important than those of the EU during accession.

This case also presents an opportunity for the ECJ to reinforce the core values of the EU, found in Article 2 of the Treaty on European Union, especially the freedom of the press and freedom of expression, especially with a declining rule of law in certain European states.
