= List of judges of the European Court of Human Rights =

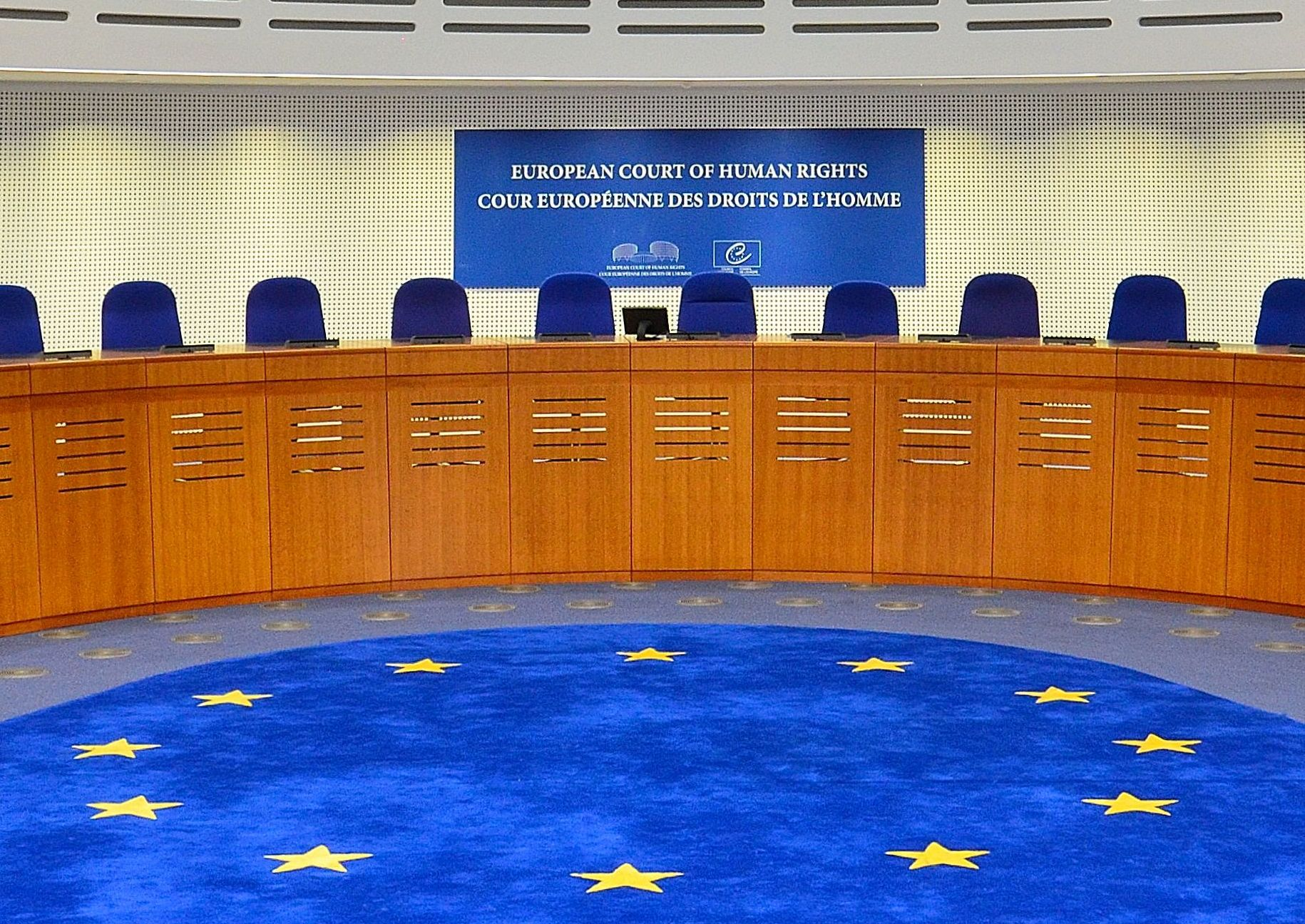
Courtroom of the European Court of Human Rights (detail).

The European Court of Human Rights is an international tribunal established for enforcement of the European Convention on Human Rights. It is an organ of the Council of Europe and judges are elected to the Court by the Council's Parliamentary Assembly in respect of each Member State. However, they do not represent the state, as they hear cases as individuals. Judges of the Court as of 1 November 2026 are, in order of precedence:

Name	Country	Position	Term began	Term ends
Mattias Guyomar	France	President	22 June 2020	22 June 2029
Arnfinn Bårdsen	Norway	Vice-President	1 January 2019	1 January 2028
Ivana Jelić	Montenegro	Vice-President	12 July 2018	12 July 2027
Kateřina Šimáčková	Czechia	Section President	13 December 2021	13 December 2030
Frédéric Krenc	Belgium	Section President	13 September 2021	13 September 2030
Mykola Gnatovskyy	Ukraine	Section President	27 June 2022	27 June 2031
Faris Vehabović	Bosnia and Herzegovina	Judge	3 December 2012	2 December 2021
Lətif Hüseynov	Azerbaijan	Judge	4 January 2017	4 January 2026
Jovan Ilievski	North Macedonia	Judge	1 February 2017	1 February 2026
Péter Paczolay	Hungary	Judge	24 April 2017	24 April 2026
Lado Chanturia	Georgia	Judge	8 January 2018	8 January 2027
María Elósegui	Spain	Judge	15 March 2018	15 March 2027
Gilberto Felici	San Marino	Judge	26 September 2018	26 September 2027
Darian Pavli	Albania	Judge	7 January 2019	7 January 2028
Erik Wennerström	Sweden	Judge	1 April 2019	1 April 2028
Raffaele Sabato	Italy	Judge	5 May 2019	5 May 2028
Saadet Yüksel	Turkey	Judge	1 July 2019	1 July 2028
Lorraine Schembri Orland	Malta	Judge	20 September 2019	20 September 2028
Anja Seibert-Fohr	Germany	Judge	1 January 2020	1 January 2029
Peeter Roosma	Estonia	Judge	4 January 2020	4 January 2029
Ana Maria Guerra Martins	Portugal	Judge	1 April 2020	1 April 2029
Ioannis Ktistakis	Greece	Section President	8 March 2021	8 March 2030
Andreas Zünd	Switzerland	Judge	29 March 2021	29 March 2030
Diana Sârcu	Moldova	Judge	6 December 2021	6 December 2030
Davor Derenčinović	Croatia	Judge	2 January 2022	2 January 2031
Oddný Mjöll Arnardóttir	Iceland	Judge	15 March 2023	15 March 2032
Anne Louise Bormann	Denmark	Judge	1 April 2023	1 April 2032
Sebastian Rădulețu	Romania	Judge	3 June 2023	3 June 2032
Diana Kovatcheva	Bulgaria	Judge	13 April 2024	13 April 2033
Gediminas Sagatys	Lithuania	Judge	16 April 2024	16 April 2033
Stéphane Pisani	Luxembourg	Judge	2 May 2024	2 May 2033
Úna Ní Raifeartaigh	Ireland	Judge	2 July 2024	2 July 2033
Alain Chablais	Liechtenstein	Judge	1 September 2024	1 September 2033
Artūrs Kučs	Latvia	Judge	3 September 2024	3 September 2033
Mateja Đurović	Serbia	Judge	16 September 2024	16 September 2033
András Jakab	Austria	Judge	1 November 2024	1 November 2033
Anna Adamska-Gallant	Poland	Judge	16 December 2024	16 December 2033
Juha Lavapuro	Finland	Judge	1 January 2025	1 January 2034
Canòlic Mingorance Cairat	Andorra	Judge	31 March 2025	31 March 2034
Vahe Grigoryan	Armenia	Judge	28 April 2025	28 April 2034
Vasilka Sancin	Slovenia	Judge	30 May 2025	30 May 2034
Sébastien Biancheri	Monaco	Judge	7 July 2025	7 July 2034
Hugh Mercer	United Kingdom	Judge	22 September 2025	22 September 2034
Nicholas Emiliou	Cyprus	Judge	27 April 2026	27 April 2035
Corinna Wissels	Netherlands	Judge	27 April 2026	27 April 2035

== Sections ==
The Court is divided into five Sections, to which each of the judges is randomly assigned. Each Section has a President, a Vice-President and a number of other judges.

The composition of the Sections as at 01 November 2026 is as follows:

Position	Section I	Section II	Section III	Section IV	Section V
President	Ivana Jelić	Arnfinn Bårdsen	Frédéric Krenc	Mykola Gnatovskyy	Kateřina Šimáčková
Vice-President	Erik Wennerström	Saadet Yüksel	Diana Kovatcheva	Lorraine Schembri Orland	María Elósegui
Judges	Raffaele Sabato; Ioannis Ktistakis; Davor Derenčinović; Alain Chablais; Artūrs Kučs; Anna Adamska-Gallant	Jovan Ilievski; Péter Paczolay; Oddný Mjöll Arnardóttir; Gediminas Sagatys; Stéphane Pisani; Juha Lavapuro; Hugh Mercer	Lәtif Hüseynov; Darian Pavli; Peeter Roosma; Úna Ní Raifeartaigh; Mateja Đurović; Canòlic Mingorance Cairat; Vasilka Sancin	Faris Vehabović; Lado Chanturia; Anja Seibert-Fohr; Ana Maria Guerra Martins; Anne Louise Bormann; Sebastian Răduleţu; András Jakab	Mattias Guyomar; Gilberto Felici; Andreas Zünd; Diana Sârcu; Vahe Grigoryan; Sébastien Biancheri; Nicholas Emiliou; Corinna Wissels
Registrar	Ilse Freiwirth	Andrea Tamietti	Milan Blasko	Hasan Bakırcı	Victor Soloveytchik
Deputy Registrar	Liv Tigerstedt	Dorothee von Arnim	Olga Chernishova	Simeon Petrovski	Martina Keller

== See also ==
- List of members of the European Court of Justice (ECJ-related list, not ECHR)
