= Renate Jaeger =

German lawyer and judge

Judge of the European Court of Human Rights
- In office 1 November 2004 – 30 December 2010
- Succeeded by: Angelika Nussberger

Justice of the Federal Constitutional Court of Germany
- In office 24 March 1994 – 31 October 2004
- Succeeded by: Reinhard Gaier

Personal details
- Born: 30 December 1940 (age 85) Darmstadt, Hesse, Germany
- Education: University of Cologne, LMU Munich, University of Lausanne

Renate Jaeger (born 30 December 1940) is a German lawyer and a former judge of the European Court of Human Rights. Her term at the Court expired on 30 December 2010.

== Early life ==
Jaeger was born in Darmstadt, a city in the state of Hesse, Germany, and studied law at the University of Cologne, LMU Munich, and the University of Lausanne. In 1968, after completing her legal training, she became a judge at the Sozialgericht of Düsseldorf in North Rhine-Westphalia. The Sozialgericht ('social court') is the lowest of three courts dealing with social security matters, the higher courts being the Landessozialgericht (state level) and national Bundessozialgericht (Federal Social Court of Germany).

== Judicial career ==
Between 1970 and 1971, Jaeger was seconded as a research assistant to the Bundessozialgericht, and in 1974 was promoted to sit on the Landessozialgericht for North Rhine-Westphalia, remaining there until 1987. From 1976 to 1979, she was again seconded as a research assistant, this time to the Bundesverfassungsgericht, the Federal Constitutional Court of Germany. In 1986, she was promoted to Presiding Judge at the Landessozialgericht, and in 1987 was called to join the Bundessozialgericht.

As well as being a member of the Federal Social Court, Jaeger was appointed in 1988 to sit on the State Constitutional Court of North Rhine-Westphalia. From 1991 to 1994, she took on a lectureship at the University of Münster. On 24 March 1994, she was appointed a judge of the Federal Constitutional Court (Bundesverfassungsgericht) in the First Senate. She was also appointed Liaison Officer between the Court and the Council of Europe's Venice Commission.

On 28 April 2004, Jaeger was elected by the Parliamentary Assembly of the Council of Europe to be a judge on the European Court of Human Rights, based in Strasbourg, France, with effect from 1 November that year. On 14 October, she received an honorary doctorate by the University of Münster, and that Autumn was awarded the Grand Cross of the Order of Merit of the Federal Republic of Germany (Großes Verdienstkreuz mit Stern und Schulterband). She was succeeded at the Federal Constitutional Court by Reinhard Gaier. On 2 July 2009, she was elected vice-president of one of the Court's Sections. Her term at the Court ended on 30 December 2010, and she was succeeded by Angelika Nussberger.

== Charity ==
Jaeger is a member of the board of trustees of Aktion Deutschland Hilft, an alliance of German emergency aid organisations.
