= Angelika Nussberger =

German professor of law and scholar of Slavic studies

Vice-President of the European Court of Human Rights
- In office 1 February 2017 – 31 December 2019

Section President (Section V) of the European Court of Human Rights
- In office 13 November 2013 – 31 December 2019

Judge of the European Court of Human Rights in respect of Germany
- In office 1 January 2011 – 31 December 2019
- Preceded by: Renate Jaeger
- Succeeded by: Anja Seibert-Fohr

Personal details
- Born: Angelika Helene Anna Nußberger; 1 June 1963 (age 63) Munich, Bavaria, Germany
- Education: LMU Munich, University of Würzburg
- Profession: Professor at the University of Cologne
- Website: Institute of Eastern European Law and Comparative Law

Angelika Helene Anna Nußberger (born 1 June 1963 in Munich) is a German professor of law and scholar of Slavic studies, and was the judge in respect of Germany at the European Court of Human Rights from 1 January 2011 to 31 December 2019; from 2017 to 2019 she was the Court's vice-president. She had previously been Vice-Rector of the University of Cologne. Currently she is Director of the Institute of Eastern European Law and Comparative Law of the University of Cologne.

== Early life ==
Nußberger was born in Munich and studied slavic languages as well as German and French literature from 1982 to 1987 and Law from 1984 to 1989 at LMU Munich. She passed the first state exam at LMU in 1989 and the second state exam at Heidelberg University in 1993. In the same year, she was awarded a doctorate by the University of Würzburg for a dissertation on Soviet constitutional law during the transition period.

== Career ==
From 1993 to 2001, Nußberger worked at the Max Planck Society Institute for International and Comparative Social Law, including a period as visiting researcher at Harvard University from 1994 to 1995. From 2001 to 2002, she worked as a legal adviser at the Council of Europe in Strasbourg.

In 2002, Nußberger achieved her habilitation, the highest academic qualification a scholar can achieve in Germany, with a thesis on public international law. In October 2002, she was appointed Professor at the Faculty of Law of the University of Cologne and as Director of the Institute of Eastern European Law. In 2009, she was elected Vice-Rector (deputy to the Rector) of the university with the newly created position of Vice-Rector for Academic Careers, Diversity and International Affairs. She has been a member of the International Labour Organization's Committee of Experts on the Application of Conventions and Recommendations from 2004 to 2010, and a deputy member of the Council of Europe's Venice Commission from 2006 to 2010. In 2010, she was awarded an honorary doctorate by Tbilisi State University in Georgia, the Schader Award in 2015 and an honorary doctorate by Lucian Blaga University of Sibiu in Romania in 2019.

On 22 June 2010, Nußberger was elected by the Parliamentary Assembly of the Council of Europe judge on behalf of Germany at the European Court of Human Rights, succeeding Renate Jaeger, previously judge of the Federal Constitutional Court of Germany. Nußberger has been elected as vice-president of the Court in February 2017.

In January 2020, Nußberger was appointed as member of the Venice Commission for Germany. In February 2020, she was appointed by the ECtHR to succeed to Giovanni Grasso as international judge to the Constitutional Court of Bosnia and Herzegovina and in July 2020 as member of the "Commission de réflexion sur la Cour de cassation 2020-2030" to elaborate on reforms regarding the French Court of Cassation (France).

=== Research ===
Nußberger's research interests focus on German and European fundamental rights and International Human Rights in addition to Comparative Constitutional Law and the impact of International Law on the legal development of Central- and Eastern Europe.

== Other activities ==
- Association of German Jurists, Member of the Board
- Schader Foundation, Member of the Senate
- Max Planck Institute for Foreign and International Criminal Law, Member of the Board of Trustees
- Association of German Constitutional Law Professors, Member
- Gesellschaft für Rechtspolitik (GfR), Member of the Presidium
- International Academy of Comparative Law, Member
- Studienstiftung des Deutschen Volkes, Alumna

== Recognition ==
- 2010 Honorary Doctorate, Tbilisi State University
- 2015: Schader Award
- 2019: Honorary Doctorate, Lucian Blaga University of Sibiu, Romania
- 2019: Member of the North Rhine-Westphalian Academy of Sciences, Humanities and the Arts
- 2019: Laureate of the Arthur-Burkhardt-Award
- 2019: Laureate of the Honorary Certificat of the Ministry of Foreign Affairs of Japan
- 2019: Member of the French Legion of Honour
- 2020: Honorary Bencher at Lincoln's Inn
- 2022: Member of the Academia Europaea

== Publications ==
=== Monograph ===
- The European Court of Human Rights, Oxford 2020, ISBN 9780198849643
- Sozialstandards im Völkerrecht. Eine Studie zu Entwicklung und Bedeutung der Normsetzung der Vereinten Nationen, der Internationalen Arbeitsorganisation und des Europarats zu Fragen des Sozialschutzes (Social standards in public international law: a study of the development and significance of the standards set by the United Nations, the International Labour Organisation and the Council of Europe with regard to social protection), Berlin 2005 ISBN 3-428-12009-4
- Das Völkerrecht: Geschichte, Institutionen, Perspektiven,(Public International Law. History, Institutions, Outlook) Munich 2009, ISBN 978-3-406-56278-5.
- Das System Putin. Gelenkte Demokratie und politische Justiz in Russland (The Putin System: controlled democracy and political justice in Russia), (with Margareta Mommsen) Munich 2007, ISBN 3-406-54790-7.
- Verfassungskontrolle in der Sowjetunion und in Deutschland. Eine rechtsvergleichende Gegenüberstellung des Komitet Konstitucionnogo Nadzora und des Bundesverfassungsgerichts (Constitutional controls in the Soviet Union and in Germany: a comparative study of the confrontation between the Komitet Konstitucionnogo Nadzora and the Federal Constitutional Court of Germany), Baden-Baden 1994, ISBN 3-7890-3262-X.

=== Publisher ===
- Einführung in das russische Recht, (Introduction to Russian Law) Munich 2010, ISBN 978-3-406-48391-2.
- Bewusstes Erinnern und bewusstes Vergessen. Der juristische Umgang mit der Vergangenheit in den Ländern Mittel- und Osteuropas, (Conscious remembrance and conscious oblivion. The legal approach of handling the history in the countries of Central and Eastern Europe), (with Caroline von Gall), Tübingen 2011, ISBN 978-3-16-150862-2.
