= Nina Vajić =

Croatian lawyer and judge

Judge of the European Court of Human Rights in respect of Croatia
- In office 1 November 1998 – 1 January 2013
- Preceded by: New appointment
- Succeeded by: Ksenija Turković

Personal details
- Born: 22 February 1948 (age 78) Zagreb, PR Croatia, FPR Yugoslavia
- Education: University of Zagreb, Graduate Institute of International Studies
- Profession: Lawyer

Nina Vajić (born 22 February 1948) is a Croatian lawyer and a former Judge of the European Court of Human Rights in respect of Croatia.

== Early life ==
Vajić was born on 22 February 1948 in Zagreb, the capital and largest city of Croatia. She studied at the Faculty of Law of the University of Zagreb from 1966 to 1971, and then worked there as an Instructor until 1978, when she was promoted to Assistant and began a Master's in International Law at the Graduate Institute of International Studies (HEI) of the University of Geneva.

== Legal career ==
She was appointed assistant professor at the University of Zagreb in 1985 and associate professor in 1991, at which time she also became Director of the university's Institute of Public and Private International Law. In 1996 became Professor of Public International Law, but only held this post until 1998, when she was elected the first judge in respect of Croatia at the newly established permanent European Court of Human Rights. In 2013 she was succeeded by Ksenija Turković.

== See also ==
- European Court of Human Rights
- List of judges of the European Court of Human Rights
