= Ksenija Turković =

Croatian jurist and judge

Vice-President of the European Court of Human Rights
- In office 18 May 2020 – 1 January 2022

Section President (Section I) of the European Court of Human Rights
- In office 1 May 2019 – 1 January 2022

Judge of the European Court of Human Rights in respect of Croatia
- In office 2 January 2013 – 1 January 2022
- Preceded by: Nina Vajić
- Succeeded by: Davor Derenčinović

Personal details
- Born: 13 February 1964 (age 62) Zagreb, SR Croatia, SFR Yugoslavia
- Education: University of Zagreb, Yale University
- Profession: Professor at the University of Zagreb

Ksenija Turković (born 13 February 1964) is a Croatian jurist and was a judge at the European Court of Human Rights (ECHR).

== Biography ==
Turković graduated from the Faculty of Law in Zagreb in 1987 and became a lecturer at the same university. She holds both a Master of Laws and a Doctor of Juridical Science from Yale Law School.

Turković practiced law while working for American law firms between 1995 and 2000, and was a member of the New York State Bar Association between 1996 and 2008. She became a full professor at the University of Zagreb in 2008. She was the head of the team of experts which developed the new Criminal Code in Croatia between 2009 and 2011. She was the vice-president of two expert committees of the Council of Europe focused on the protection of children's rights.

On 2 October 2012, Turković was elected as a judge of the ECHR by the Parliamentary Assembly of the Council of Europe (PACE) out of three candidates succeeding Nina Vajić In May 2020, she became vice-president of the ECHR for one year. Her tenure as judge of the ECHR ended on 1 January 2022.

== Works ==
Turković is the author and contributor to several books focusing on law.
