= Wennerstrom =

Wennerstrom or Wennerström may refer to:

- Wennerstrom (surname)
- Hans-Erik Wennerström, fictional character in novel The Girl with the Dragon Tattoo
