= Mischo =

Mischo is a surname. Notable people with the surname include:

- Georges Mischo (born 1974), Luxembourgish politician and former sports teacher
- Jean Mischo (born 1938–2016), Luxembourgish European judge
- Luc Mischo (born 1974), Luxembourgish footballer
- R.J. Mischo (born 1960), American electric blues harmonicist, singer, songwriter, and record producer
