= Advocate general (European Union) =

Functionary of the European Court of Justice

In the European Union, the advocates general (French: avocats généraux, singular: avocat général) are high-ranking functionaries serving in the European Court of Justice (ECJ). Modelled after the French commissaire du gouvernement, the position of advocate general was created together with the European Court of Justice in 1951, when the Treaty of Paris was signed.

The advocate general participates in the court cases and may question the parties, after which they craft their opinions, though in the case when no new point of law is raised, it is not needed. It is only after their opinion that the Court of Justice starts to make its judgment. While the advocate general's opinion is not binding for the ECJ nor for the courts in the member states, their conclusions are often taken into consideration and are often indicative of the ruling by the Court of Justice in the case.

Since 2020, there are eleven advocates general appointed for six-year terms, five of whom are designated from the largest member states in the EU (Germany, France, Italy, Spain, and Poland) and the other six members are appointed between the other member states. The first advocate general, who is tasked with assigning the cases to her or himself or their fellow advocates general and has some powers related to judicial review of the General Court cases, is elected for a three-year term among these eleven people. Ad hoc advocates general may also be appointed for cases before the General Court among the judges working in the court, but this possibility is not used now.

== Legal basis ==
The signing of the Treaty of Paris established the European Coal and Steel Community, i.a. featuring a judicial body called the "Court of Justice". During negotiations that led to its signing, the French delegation resented the possibility of dissenting or concurring opinions on the cases. Therefore, Maurice Lagrange, part of the delegation who would later become the first advocate general appointed to the court, proposed that such views be presented by an advocate general, who would perform a similar function to that of the French commissaire du gouvernement (equivalent to the rapporteur public since 2009). The commissaire is tasked with offering legal advice to the Conseil d'État, the highest administrative court. This vision was implemented in the Protocol on the Statute of the Court of Justice as signed in 1951 and has stayed virtually the same ever since.

=== Composition ===
Currently, according to the provisions in Article 19 of the Treaty of the European Union (TEU) and Article 252 of the Treaty on the Functioning of the European Union (TFEU), the European Court of Justice, apart from 27 judges (one for every member state), also has eleven advocates general. The European Council, acting unanimously, may increase this number if requested so by the ECJ.

When the Court of Justice was formed, it was decided to appoint two advocates general, one from Germany and the other from France. The United Kingdom and Italy joined in 1973, Spain followed in 1995 and Poland did so in 2013. Because the UK left the European Union in 2020, there are now five member states (the most populated ones) entitled to appoint their own advocates general. Other member states appoint advocates general on a rotational basis (one in 1981–1986, two in 1986–1995, four in 1995–2000, three in 2000–2015, five in 2015–2020 and six since 2020). Each advocate general serves a six-year term, may be reappointed and, barring disciplinary removal or resignation, is not removable during the term; however, given the rotational nature of the appointments from countries without a permanent member, these extensions are effectively limited to the five countries that may send their own advocates general. If the position is vacated before the end of the term, a replacement is appointed for the remainder of the term, usually from the same country. An advocate general may be removed prematurely if the Member State which appointed him or her withdraws from the EU.

Since 1974, the first advocate general has been elected from those serving in such capacity. Since 1979, they are in charge of distributing the cases among fellow advocates general. For three decades after its creation, the position was rotated between each of the advocates general, but Melchior Wathelet was the first person to have been elected more than two times and the first to have served consecutive terms. In November 2019, the rules of procedure were changed so that the terms were increased to three years. The first election under the new rules happened in October 2021, when Maciej Szpunar, who had already been serving in that position for three years, was elected to serve for another three years. The first advocate general, however, is not above the other advocates general and is in most regards in the same position as their ten other colleagues.

=== Criteria of appointment ===
Advocates general share the criteria of appointment with the judges (mentioned in articles 2–4 of the Statute of the ECJ and in Article 253 of TFEU). They are appointed by mutual accord of the national governments after consultations with a special panel (a so-called "Article 255 panel") that screens the candidates and issues non-binding opinions on their suitability for office; (Note: Though formally non-binding, the opinions have so far been heeded and, as Dumbrovsky et al. say, are de facto binding.) The advocates general should be eligible for service in the highest national courts or be lawyers "of recognised competence", and should exhibit independence. Just like the judges, the advocates general take an oath of office and are in general immune from legal persecution. They are barred from holding political or administrative offices and may only hold occupations other than that at the Court of Justice if the European Council decides to grant an exemption.

== Procedure and assignment ==
The procedure in cases before the ECJ is to assign the responsible judge-rapporteur and advocate general, which is done by the President of the ECJ and the first advocate general, respectively. In general, the first advocate general has full discretion over the way the cases are assigned, but several informal rules guide the process. For instance, arrangements in which certain advocates general specialise in one particular broad topic are often avoided so that the cases can be approached from different perspectives and thus give more material from which the Court of Justice may draw its conclusions. This rule is, however, not strictly followed, particularly if the advocate general has been treating that specific topic extensively. It is also customary for the first advocate general not to assign an advocate general to the case to which the member state, which the advocate general is from, is party. Deviations from that guideline may attract controversy.

Historically, every case had to receive an advocate general's opinion; however, since the Treaty of Nice came to life in 2003, a rule was introduced saying that if the case makes no new point of law (which in 2015, when the latest figures are available, happened in 43% of the cases, with earlier years' estimates ranging from 30% to 53%), the advocate general's opinion is not needed; in this case, the court consults the advocate general and, if they agree, only the court's judgment is issued. When the case comes to the Grand Chamber, however, it is always accompanied with such an opinion. The advocate general is obliged to submit his opinion so many times as oral hearings are requested, such that in one of the cases, Commission v. Belgium (Belgian Waste), three opinions were issued; situations when more than one hearing is made, however, happen rarely.

According to the Article 20 of the Statute of the ECJ, the designated advocate general is present during the interactions with the parties. All advocates general may additionally receive advance copies of the judgment and participate in the closed sessions when the ECJ delivers an opinion, but, unlike the judges, they do not participate in the deliberative process of the court.

== Opinions of the advocates general ==
An advocate general, according to Takis Tridimas, serves several purposes. The advocate general helps prepare the case for the Court of Justice. Moreover, their opinions provide the proposed solution and logical reasoning to reach the conclusion presented, all while providing research on the existing case law as well as on the legal points presented.

Contrary to the judgments of the ECJ, which tend to be terse and abstract, a legacy of the French judicial discourse, the opinion of the advocate general does not need to conform to these criteria, and may in fact take any form the advocate general wishes. Historically, particularly until the 1980s, the opinions of the advocates general closely followed the judicial interpretations of the ECJ, but since then, the rulings have become somewhat less reverential towards them.

The opinions may be written in the native language of the Advocate General (any of the 24 official languages of the European Union), though in order to reduce the workload of the translation service, they are now increasingly drafted in one of the five so-called "pivot languages", that is: French, English, German, Spanish and Italian, and the advocates general are particularly encouraged to write in the first two of them. Advocate General's submissions, if needed, are then translated into French, the working language of the ECJ. The judgment of the ECJ is only drafted after receiving advocate general's opinion, though some preparations are possible if the judge rapporteur and his référendaires (clerks) understand the language of the procedure.

The Court of Justice is not bound by the opinions of the Advocates General and need not even address them. In fact, in 2004–2005, only 39% of judgments cited the opinion of the advocate general (the percentage was around 46% in 2017). However, the advocate general's opinions are considered influential. Quantitative studies seem to support the notion. The one from 2017 found that, among the 109 judgments surveyed, 64% agreed in principle with the ruling, 9% disagreed and the rest only agreed in some points; moreover, in 69% of the cases, there were at most slight differences between the interpretations of the legal sources. Another study, which only analysed annulments, found that the ECJ was 67% more likely to strike down parts of an act or the whole act if the advocate general indicated their support for the action, compared to the situations where the opposite was true, though the paper cautioned against making causal inferences.

== List of advocates general ==
Note: Current advocates general are bolded; the expected end of their terms is mentioned in italics.

Country	First and last name	Years of service		
Country	First and last name	Start	End	As First AG
France	Maurice Lagrange	1952	1964	
Germany	Karl Roemer	1953	1973	
France	Joseph Gand	1964	1970	
France	Alain Louis Dutheillet de Lamothe	1970	1972	
France	Henri Mayras	1972	1981	1975–1976
Italy	Alberto Trabucchi	1973	1976	1974–1975
United Kingdom	Jean-Pierre Warner	1973	1981	1976–1977 1979–1980
Germany	Gerhard Reischl	1973	1984	1977–1978 1980–1981
Italy	Francesco Capotorti	1976	1982	1978–1979 1981–1982
United Kingdom	Gordon Slynn	1981	1988	1983–1984
France	Simone Rozès	1981	1984	1982–1983
Netherlands	Pieter verLoren van Themaat	1981	1986	1984–1985
Italy	Giuseppe Federico Mancini	1982	1988	1985–1986
Germany	Carl Otto Lenz	1984	1997	1986–1987 1992–1993
France	Marco Darmon	1984	1994	1987–1988 1993–1994
Luxembourg	Jean Mischo	1986	1991	1988–1989
Portugal	José Luís da Cruz Vilaça	1986	1988	
Belgium	Walter van Gerven	1988	1994	1989–1990
United Kingdom	Francis Geoffrey Jacobs	1988	2006	1990–1991 1994–1995
Italy	Giuseppe Tesauro	1988	1998	1991–1992 1995–1996
Denmark	Claus Christian Gulmann	1991	1994	
Greece	Georges Cosmas	1994	2000	1997–1998
Denmark	Michael Bendik Elmer	1994	1997	
France	Philippe Léger	1994	2006	1998–1999
Italy	Antonio Mario La Pergola	1995	1999	1996–1997
Ireland	Nial Fennelly	1995	2000	1999–2000
Spain	Dámaso Ruiz-Jarabo Colomer	1995	2009	2000–2001
Germany	Siegbert Alber	1997	2003	2001–2002
Luxembourg	Jean Mischo	1997	2003	2002–2003
Italy	Antonio Saggio	1998	2000	
Italy	Antonio Tizzano	2000	2006	2003–2004
Netherlands	Ad Geelhoed	2000	2006	2004–2005
Austria	Christine Stix-Hackl	2000	2006	2005–2006
**Germany**	**Juliane Kokott**	**2003**	**2027**	2006–2007
Portugal	Miguel Poiares Maduro	2003	2009	2007–2008
United Kingdom	Eleanor Sharpston	2006	2020	2008–2009
Italy	Paolo Mengozzi	2006	2018	2009–2010
France	Yves Bot	2006	2019	2010–2011
Slovakia	Ján Mazák	2006	2012	2011–2012
Slovenia	Verica Trstenjak	2006	2012	
Finland	Niilo Jääskinen	2009	2015	2012–2013
Spain	Pedro Cruz Villalón	2009	2015	2013–2014
Belgium	Melchior Wathelet	2012	2018	2014–2018
Sweden	Nils Wahl	2012	2018	
**Poland**	**Maciej Szpunar**	**2013**	**2030**	**2018–2027**
Czech Republic	Michal Bobek	2015	2021	
Denmark	Henrik Saugmandsgaard Øe	2015	2021	
**Spain**	**Manuel Campos Sánchez-Bordona**	**2015**	**2027**	
Bulgaria	Evgeni Tanchev	2016	2021	
Ireland	Gerard Hogan	2018	2021	
Italy	Giovanni Pitruzzella	2018	2024	
Estonia	Priit Pikamäe	2019	2025	
**Greece**	**Athanasios Rantos**	**2020**	**2027**	
**France**	**Jean Richard de la Tour**	**2020**	**2030**	
Ireland	Anthony Collins	2021	2024	
**Latvia**	**Laila Medina**	**2021**	**2027**	
**Cyprus**	**Nicholas Emiliou**	**2021**	**2027**	
**Croatia**	**Tamara Ćapeta**	**2021**	**2027**	
**Italy**	**Andrea Biondi**	**2024**	**2030**	
**Lithuania**	**Rimvydas Norkus**	**2024**	**2030**	
**Luxembourg**	**Dean Spielmann**	**2024**	**2030**	

== General Court ==
In the General Court, unlike the European Court of Justice, there are no specifically designated advocates general, and those serving in the ECJ may not be used for General Court's purposes. However, according to Article 3 of the Rules of Procedure of the General Court, those judges who are not the president, the vice-president or the presidents of chambers of the General Court may be asked to serve as advocates general for a particular case, with the procedure, functions and duties similar to those as in ECJ. These judges, just like in the higher chamber of the Court of Justice of the European Union, may not take part in the judgment of the case (Article 49 of the Statute of the Court of Justice) but may participate in the inquiry of the case and in the questioning of parties.

The General Court made virtually no use of this rule after it was introduced. There are four cases for the period between 1990 and 1992 in which it has assigned a judge as an Advocate General. Only after the Statute Reform of 2024, which granted the General Court jursdictions to hear certain requests for preliminary rulings, it started to assign judges as Advocate Generals again.

Despite the fact that none of the advocates general of the ECJ issue opinions in the cases in front of the General Court, the first advocate general may trigger a special review procedure under Article 62 of the Statute of the ECJ (Réexamen in French) by filing an appropriate request within a month's time since the General Court's ruling in case they believe that the ruling of the General Court has a high risk of "the unity of consistency of Union law being affected". As of October 2021, the procedure has been used 16 times, and 8 cases proceeded to the review stage.
