= Paulo Pinto de Albuquerque =

Portuguese judge

Judge of the European Court of Human Rights in respect of Portugal
- In office 1 April 2011 – 31 March 2020
- Succeeded by: Ana Maria Guerra Martins

Personal details
- Born: 5 October 1966 (age 59) Beira, Mozambique

Paulo Pinto de Albuquerque (born 5 October 1966) is a Portuguese judge born in Beira, Mozambique and was the judge of the European Court of Human Rights in respect of Portugal from April 2011 to March 2020.

== Education ==
- Law Degree, Faculty of Law, State University of Lisbon, 1989
- Master of Law, Faculty of Law, Catholic University of Lisbon, 1994
- Doctorate of Law, Faculty of Law, Catholic University of Lisbon, 2003
- Habilitation (tenure), Faculty of Law, Catholic University of Lisbon, 2011

== Academic career ==
- Assistant Professor, Faculty of Law, Catholic University of Lisbon, 2004-2008
- Invited Professor on criminal law and procedure at the High Military Studies Institute of the Ministry of Defence of Portugal, 2007-2009
- Associate Professor, Faculty of Law, Catholic University of Lisbon, 2008-2010
- Associate Professor with tenure, Faculty of Law, Catholic University of Lisbon, 2011-2015
- Full Professor with tenure (professor catedratico), Faculty of Law, Catholic University of Lisbon, since 2015
- Visiting Professor, Illinois College of Law, United States of America, 2006-2007
- Visiting Professor, Jiao Tong University, Shanghai, China, 2006
- Adjunct Professor, Illinois College of Law, United States of America, 2009-2010
- Visiting Professor, Paris II-Assas University, since 2017
- Visiting Professor, Kharkiv University, Ukraine, since 2020
- Visiting Professor, Florence University, Italy, since 2021

For more than fifteen years, Pinto de Albuquerque has collaborated academically with the Italian legal scholar Bruna Capparelli in the fields of criminal procedure and human rights. Their cooperation includes joint participation in international conferences, co-authored scholarly publications, and editorial projects. Pinto de Albuquerque wrote the preface to Capparelli’s monograph Litispendência e ne bis in idem penal - Teoria geral (2023). He also contributed to the collective volumes Os direitos humanos em uma perspectiva europeia: Votos divergentes e concorrentes (2014-2020) (Human Rights in a European Perspective, Concurring and Dissenting Opinions (2016-2020)(2024), coordinated and edited by Bruna Capparelli and colleagues, which include her introductory essays and editorial work.

== Other professional experience ==
- Expert of the GRECO appointed by the Council of Europe, 2009-2010
- Expert of the European Commission study “Crime Repression Costs in Context”, 2007-2009
- Expert of the Portuguese Parliament for draft legislation on domestic violence (2009) and the fight against corruption (2010)
- Member of Amnesty International-Portugal since 1989 and member of the National Administration Board of Amnesty International-Portugal from April 2008 to his election as a judge at the European Court of Human Rights in January 2011.

== Juridical career ==
- Judge in various civil and criminal courts, 1992-2004
- Member of the Taskforce for Criminal Procedure Reform of the Ministry of Justice of Germany, 1999
- Member of the Taskforce for Penal Reform of the Ministry of Justice of Portugal, 2005-2007
- Lawyer, since 2006

== Judge at the European Court of Human Rights ==
- Judge at the European Court of Human Rights, elected with an absolute majority (on the first ballot) by the Parliamentary Assembly of the Council of Europe on 25 January 2011. Sworn in on 1 April 2011. Mandate expired on 31 March 2020.
- Focal Point of the ECHR network of international, supreme and constitutional courts outside of Europe, appointed by the President of the ECHR. In this capacity, he established institutional relations with the African Court on Human and Peoples' Rights, the Constitutional Court and the Supreme Court of Appeal of South Africa, the Constitutional Court and the Supreme Court of Angola, the Superior Court of Brazil, the Federal Supreme Court of Brazil, the Supreme Court of China, the Supreme Court of India, the Supreme Court of Israel, the Supreme Court of Japan, the Constitutional Court of Jordan, the Constitutional Court of South Korea and the Supreme Court of Mozambique, from January 2016 to March 2020.
- Vice-president of section IV of the ECHR, from September 2018 to April 2019.
- President of the ECHR Committee on the Rules of the Court, from October 2018 to March 2020.
- Ad Hoc Judge before the ECHR appointed by the Republic of Lithuania, since 2016.
- Member of the ECHR Grand Chamber panel (composed by five judges) which selects the cases that are reviewed by the Grand Chamber, from June to December 2012 and again from June to December 2016.
- Founder and President of the Criminal Law Group of the ECHR, from January 2014 to March 2020.
- He seated in two cases where Amnesty International was either the applicant (CASE OF BIG BROTHER WATCH AND OTHERS v. THE UNITED KINGDOM), or a third party ( CASE OF HIRSI JAMAA AND OTHERS v. ITALY).

== Honors ==
- Doctor of Law Honoris Causa, Yaroslav Mudrii University of Kharkiv, Ukraine, September 2021.
- Commendation by the Japanese Government for promoting the cooperation agreement between the Supreme Court of Japan and the European Court of Human Rights, Japanese Consulate, Strasbourg, March 2020.
- Medal of Honour of the Portuguese Lawyers’ Bar for the defence of human rights and constitutional freedoms during a 30-year long professional career as judge, lawyer and law professor, Lisbon, January 2020.
- Doctor of Law Honoris Causa, Edge Hill University, Omskirk, United Kingdom, December 2019.

== Works ==
1. Os direitos humanos em uma perspectiva européia : votos divergentes e concorrente (2014-2020) (Human Rights in a European Perspective, Concurring and Dissenting Opinions (2016-2020), with prefaces from STF judge Gilmar Ferreira Mendes, organization and introduction by Professor Doctor Bruna Capparelli et al. and comments by 60 Italian University Professors and Magistrates, Tirant Lo Blanch Coleção Direito e Processo Penal, vol. 2, 2024, 663 pages: https://editorial.tirant.com/free_ebooks/E000020005819.pdf

2. Os direitos humanos em uma perspectiva européia : votos divergentes e concorrente (2014-2020) (Human Rights in a European Perspective, Concurring and Dissenting Opinions (2016-2020), with prefaces from STF judge Gilmar Ferreira Mendes, organization and introduction by Professor Doctor Bruna Capparelli et al. and comments by 60 Italian University Professors and Magistrates, Tirant Lo Blanch Coleção Direito e Processo Penal, vol. 1, 2024, 512 pages: https://editorial.tirant.com/free_ebooks/E000020005806.pdf

3. Окрема думка. Шлях до справедливост-, with preface of President of the Constitutional Court of Ukraine Oleksandr Tupytskyi, Kharkiv: Pravo, 2020, 558 pages: https://pravo-izdat.com.ua/naukovo-praktichna-literatura/okrema_dumka_shljah_do_spravedlivosti

4. Convenção Europeia dos Direitos Humanos - Seleção de opiniões, with preface of President of Brazilian Supreme Court José Dias Toffoli, São Paulo: Revista dos Tribunais, 2019, 448 pages: https://www.livrariart.com.br/convencao-europeia-dos-direitos-humanos-9788553216642/p

5. Em Defesa dos Direitos Fundamentais, with preface of Lawyers Bar Guilherme Figueiredo, Lisboa: Universidade Católica Editora, 2019, 342 pages:http://www.uceditora.ucp.pt/site/custom/template/ucptpl_uce.asp?SSPAGEID=1190&lang=1&artigoID=4838

6. Особое мнение. В поисках истины, Пауло Пинто де Альбукерке; с предисловием и при участии Д. И. Дедова; Dissenting opinion. In search of truth, with preface of ECHR Judge Dmitry Dedov, Moscovo: Развитие правовых систем, Development of Legal Systems Publishing House, 2018, 496 pages

7. I Diritti Umani in una Prospettiva Europea, Opinioni concorrenti e dissenzienti (2011-2015) with preface of Paola Bilancia and introduction of Davide Galliani, both professors of Milano University, Milano : Giappichelli Editore, 2016, 395 pages: https://www.giappichelli.it/i-diritti-umani-in-una-prospettiva-europea

8. Hablemos de Derechos Humanos. La doctrina del TEDH y su aplicación en España desde los votos particulares del Juez Paulo Pinto de Albuquerque, em co-autoria com o juiz do Tribunal Supremo da Catalunha Carlos Hugo Preciado Domènech, com prefácio do juiz do Tribunal Constitucional espanhol Fernando Valdés dal-Ré, Valencia: Tirant lo Blanch, 2020, 824 pages: https://editorial.tirant.com/es/autorList/paulo-pinto-de-albuquerque-492629

9. Droits de l'Homme. Les opinions separées vues par la doctrine, with preface of Judge of the French Constitutional Council Nicole Maestracci and introduction of Judge of the Court of Cassation Hugues Fulchiron, Paris: Lexis Nexis, 2020, 800 pages: https://enseignant.lexisnexis.fr/10413-adroits-de-l-homme/

10. Judge Pinto de Albuquerque and the Progressive Development of International Human Rights Law, with a preface by the President of the European Court of Human Rights Professor Doctor Linos-Alexandre Sicilianos, organization and introduction by Professor Doctor Triestino Mariniello, Leiden: Brill, 2021, 954 pages: https://brill.com/view/title/58201?language=en

11. I Diritti Umani in una Prospettiva Europea, Opinioni concorrenti e dissenzienti (2016-2020) (Human Rights in a European Perspective, Concurring and Dissenting Opinions (2016-2020), with prefaces from ECHR judges Raffaele Sabato and Gilberto Felici, organization and introduction by Professor Doctor Andrea Saccucci and comments by 60 Italian University Professors and Magistrates, Genova : Editoriale Scientifica, 2021, 1316 pages: https://www.editorialescientifica.com/shop/autori/saccucci-a/i-diritti-umani-in-una-prospettiva-europea-detail.html

12. İçtihatlarla İnsan Hakları: Yargıç Pinto de Albuquerque'nin Seçilmiş Şerhlerinin ve İlgili AİHM Kararlarının İncelemeleri kitabı (Human Rights in Case Law: Reviews of Selected Opinions of Judge Pinto de Albuquerque and Related ECtHR Judgments), by Pinto de Albuquerque, Adem Sözüer, Pinar Ölcer, Eren Sözüer (eds.), 3 volumes, Istanbul: Onikilevha, 2021: https://www.onikilevha.com.tr/yayin/2098/ictihatlarla-insan-haklari-yargic-pinto-de-albuquerquenin-secilmis-serhlerinin-ve-ilgili-aihm-kararlarinin-incelemeleri-3-cilt

EDITED BOOKS

1. Paulo Albuquerque and Krystof Wojtyczek (eds.), Judicial Power in a Globalized World - Liber Amicorum Vincent De Gaetano, Berlin: Springer, 2019, 685 pages: https://link.springer.com/book/10.1007/978-3-030-20744-1

2. Emilio Dolcini, Elvio Fassone, Davide Galliani, Paulo Albuquerque and Andrea Pugiotto (eds.), Il diritto alla speranza. L’ergastolo nel diritto penale costituzionale, Milano: Giappicheli Editore, 2019, 512 pages: https://www.giappichelli.it/il-diritto-alla-speranza

3. Iulia Motoc, Paulo Albuquerque and Krystof Wojtyczek (eds.), New Developments in Constitutional Law, Essays in honour of Andras Sajo, The Hague: Eleven, 2018, 548 pages:https://www.ipgbook.com/new-developments-in-constitutional-law-products-9789462367586.php?page_id=21

4. João Otávio Noronha and Paulo Pinto de Albuquerque (eds.), Comentários sobre a Convenção Americana sobre Direitos Humanos (commentary of the American Convention on Human Rights), São Paulo: Tirant lo Blanch Brasil, 1810 pages: https://editorial.tirant.com/br/libro/comentarios-a-convencao-americana-sobre-direitos-humanos-joao-otavio-de-noronha-9786587684932

5. Paulo Pinto de Albuquerque (ed.), Comentário da Convenção Europeia dos Direitos Humanos e dos Protocolos Adicionais (Commentary of the European Convention on Human Rights and its Additional Protocols), Lisboa: Universidade Católica Editora, I, II and III volumes, 2019: http://www.uceditora.ucp.pt/site/custom/template/ucptpl_uce.asp?SSPAGEID=2969&lang=1&artigoID=9861

6. Paulo Pinto de Albuquerque (ed.), Comentário da Carta Africana dos Direitos Humanos e dos Povos e do Protocolo Adicional (Commentary of the African Convention on Human and Peoples’ Rights and its Additional Protocol), with prefaces by the Presidents of the Republic of Angola, Cabo Verde, Guiné-Bissau, Mozambique and São Tomé e Príncipe, Lisboa: UCE, 2020, 1301 pages: https://www.uceditora.ucp.pt/pt/comentarios-de-leis/2063-comentario-da-carta-africana-dos-direitos-humanos.html

7. Robert Spano, Iulia Motoc, Paulo Pinto de Albuquerque, Branko Lubarda, Marialena Tsirli (eds.), Procès équitable : perspectives régionales et internationals, Fair Trial : Regional and International Perspectives, Liber Amicorum Linos-Alexandre Sicilianos, Bruxelles: Anthemis, 2020, 772 pages: https://www.anthemis.be/en/shop/product/libsos-proces-equitable-perspectives-regionales-et-internationales-fair-trial-regional-and-international-perspectives-8482#attr=7086,3027,12271
