= David Horspool =

British journalist and historian (born 1971)

- Born: David Cyril Greame Horspool; 7 January 1971 (age 55); Wimbledon, London
- Education: Milbourne Lodge School; Eton College
- Alma mater: Christ Church, Oxford (MA)
- Occupations: Journalist; Author
- Employer: Times Literary Supplement
- Notable work: Why Alfred Burnt the Cakes; Richard III: A Ruler and his Reputation
- Height: 6"7
- Children: 2
- Mother: Margot Horspool

David Cyril Greame Horspool (born 7 January 1971) is a historian and fishing editor of The Times Literary Supplement.

== Writing ==
A scholar at Eton and Christ Church, Oxford, he writes for the Sunday Times, The Guardian, the Telegraph and The New York Times.

== Books ==
His first book, Why Alfred Burned the Cakes: A King and His 1100-year Afterlife, was a history of the reign of King Alfred. His next book, published in August 2009, was The English Rebel: One Thousand Years of Trouble-making from the Normans to the Nineties, a history of rebellion from Magna Carta to Arthur Scargill. David collaborated with Colin Firth and Anthony Arnove to produce the book The People's Speak, published by Canongate Books in August 2013. In 2015 he published Richard III: A Ruler and his reputation.
