= Johann Andreas Kauchlitz Colizzi =

Dutch musician, composer and etcher

Johann Andreas Kauchlitz Colizzi (about 1742 – 15 August 1808) was a Dutch musician, composer and etcher. He was also known as Johannes Colizzi.

== Bohemian and German years ==
Kauchlitz Colizzi was born in Chrudim, a town in eastern Bohemia, a part of the current Czech Republic. There is little data on the family in which he grew up. Only the name of his sister Ludmilla is known. Nothing is known about his education.

As an adult Johann Andreas taught his students to play the harpsichord and pianoforte. He also composed and gave singing lessons. His first published composition, a collection of songs with harpsichord accompaniment, appeared in 1766 in Braunschweig. Colizzi also made himself a meritorious etcher.

== Leiden period ==
On 15 June 1766 he obtained the appointment as an Italian language teacher at Leiden University, in Leiden. The Leiden art society Kunstgenootschap 'Kunst Wordt Door Arbeid Verkreegen' published his bundle with songs and dances on the occasion of the wedding of prince-stadtholder William V of Orange and princess Wilhelmina of Prussia. His orchestral works were written in the Leiden years. Among these works are the 'Ouverture Slavonne' and the 'Quattro Concerti Barbari'. In 1774 his Dissertatio Philosophica De Sono was published based on a manuscript that he had completed six years earlier. The book was followed by several other music theory works of his hand.

== The Hague period ==
In April and May 1777 Colizzi moved because of his appointment as harpsichordist at the stadtholderly Music Chapel in The Hague and music teacher of, among others, the future Dutch King William I and his mother princess Wilhelmina.

In the years 1762-1787 hymns of the Amsterdam reverend Rutger Schutte (1708-1784) were published. Colizzi was asked to write melodies in Italian style for the fourth volume.

After the Music Chapel was disbanded, because of the flight of the prince-stadtholder in 1795, Colizzi remained in The Hague. From 1797 dates the composition for singing voice with keyboard accompaniment on the occasion of the silver wedding anniversary of the Danish envoy, baron Herman Schubart (1756-1832) and his wife, celebrated in The Hague.

== Marriage ==
He married in Leiden on 11 May 1772 as the music teacher Jan Collizzi with Cornelia Maria van Dinter, one of the daughters of the Leiden physician Hermanus van Dinter. When the young couple had their last will drawn up by a notary in April 1774, they lived on the Nieuwe Rijn, near the seventeenth-century bridge the Visbrug. The marriage bore no children, possibly due to the death of Cornelia Maria in February 1775.

== Death ==
Colizzi died in The Hague on 15 August 1808. He was buried in the cemetery Eik en Duinen (now Oud Eik en Duinen). An auction catalog of the estate was published shortly after his death by The Hague bookseller Scheurleer. The estate included dozens of compositions and various etched cards.
