= Nicholas Emiliou =

Cypriot diplomat and jurist

Judge of the European Court of Human Rights in respect of Cyprus
- Incumbent
- Assumed office 27 April 2026
- Preceded by: Georgios Serghides

Advocate General of the European Court of Justice
- In office 7 October 2021 – 26 April 2026

Permanent Representative of Cyprus to the European Union
- In office 2017–2021

Permanent Representative of Cyprus to the United Nations
- In office 2012–2017

Permanent Secretary of the Ministry of Foreign Affairs of Cyprus
- In office 2008–2012

Permanent Representative of Cyprus to the European Union
- In office 2004–2008

Permanent Representative of Cyprus to the Council of Europe
- In office 2002–2004

Ambassador of Cyprus to Ireland
- In office 1999–2002

Personal details
- Born: June 14, 1963 (age 63) Famagusta, Cyprus
- Education: London School of Economics (LL.M.); University College London (Ph.D.)
- Profession: Diplomat, jurist

Nicholas Emiliou (born 14 June 1963) is a Cypriot diplomat and jurist. Since 2026, he has served as a judge at the European Court of Human Rights in respect of Cyprus. Previously he has worked as Permanent Representative of Cyprus to the European Union from 2017 to 2021 and as an Advocate General at the European Court of Justice from 2021 to 2026.

== Education and university Career ==
He received an LL.M. (European Law) from the London School of Economics and Political Science in 1987 and a Ph.D. (Law) from University College London in 1991. He held various academic jobs in the United Kingdom from 1988 to 1997, at University College London, the University of Southampton, Queen Mary University of London and the University of Durham. During this time as a Fellow of the UCL Centre for European Law, he worked closely with his European law colleagues, Professor Francis Snyder, David O'Keeffe and Margot Horspool. He also published many books and articles.

== Diplomatic career ==
Ambassador Emiliou joined the Ministry of Foreign Affairs of Cyprus in 1994 as advisor to the Minister of Foreign Affairs. In 1997 he was appointed as Minister Plenipotentiary at the EU Division of the Ministry of Foreign Affairs in Nicosia. In 1998, he became Deputy Permanent Delegate of Cyprus to the European Union, and in 1999, became Ambassador Plenipotentiary and Extraordinary of the Republic of Cyprus in Ireland. In 2000, he was Promoted to the rank of the Ambassador of Cyprus. From 2002 to 2004, he was Permanent Representative of Cyprus to the Council of Europe in Strasbourg. From 2004 to 2008, he was Permanent Representative of Cyprus to the European Union and from 2008 to 2012, he was Permanent Secretary, that is, the senior permanent official of the Ministry of Foreign Affairs. In 2012, he was appointed Permanent Representative of Cyprus to the United Nations, which he left in 2017 to return to Brussels as Permanent Representative of Cyprus to the European Union.

== Judicial career ==
On 21 April 2021, Emiliou was appointed by the representatives of the governments of the EU member states to become an Advocate General at the European Court of Justice from 7 October 2021 to 6 October 2027.

On 27 January 2026, Emiliou was elected as a judge at the European Court of Human Rights (ECtHR) by the Parliamentary Assembly of the Council of Europe. His term of office at the ECtHR began on 27 April 2026.
