= Chrudim Military Airfield =

Chrudim Military Airfield
- Chrudim, Pardubice Region in Czech Republic
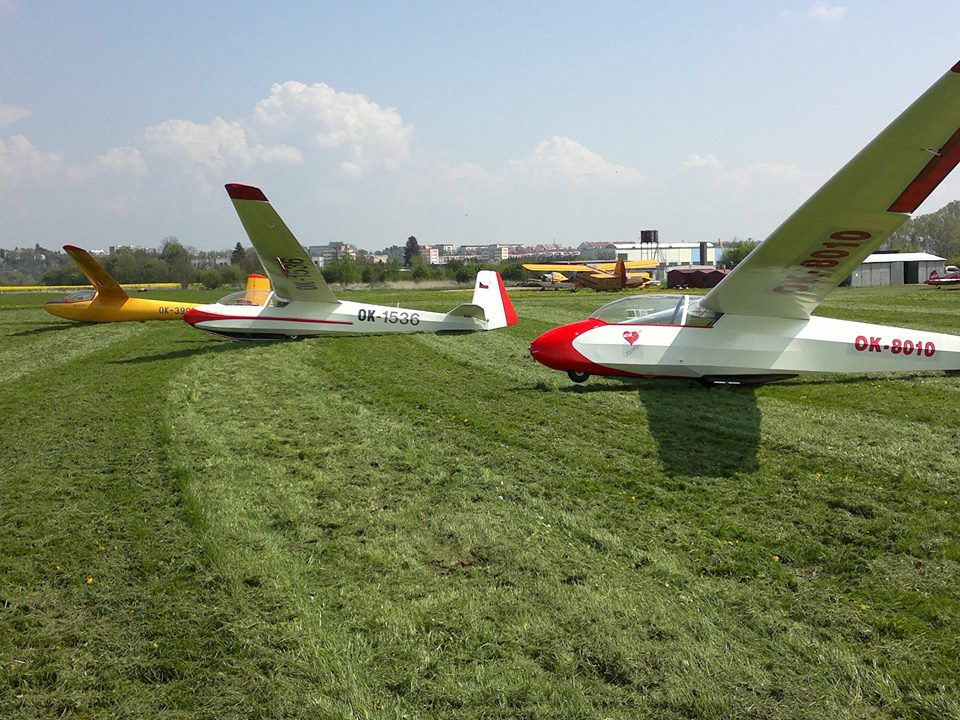
- The glider fleet of the Chrudim Aeroclub at the Chrudim airport.

Site information
- Owner: Ministry of Defense
- Operator: Czechoslovak Air Force

Location
- Coordinates: 49°56′06″N 15°46′51″E

Site history
- Built: 1938; 88 years ago
- In use: 1938–1992

Garrison information
- Occupants: No. 73 & No. 74 Light Bomber Squadrons CAF of 6th Aviation Regiment

Chrudim Military Airfield (Czech: Vojenské letiště Chrudim), also known as Pardubice Airfield (ICAO: LKCR) was a Czechoslovak Air Force base located in the town of Chrudim, Pardubice Region of the Czech Republic. Today, it is civil airfield operated by the Chrudim Aeroclub.

== History ==
On 15 December, 1937, following several negotiations with the city council, it was decided that an Air Force squadron would be based in Chrudim. After preliminary works were completed on 23 December, 1937, the municipality concluded a contract with the Construction Directorate in Hradec Králové for the squadron. A week later, the contract was approved by the district council, and the Chrudim municipality undertook the construction of the barracks, providing all land necessary for the construction. An already existing road was modified to lead to the barracks complex, and buildings were built accordingly to the needs of the military administration. Electrical, sewerage, and a water supply network was also installed, insuring protection against natural disasters. It would be maintained until the airport was used by the military. The total construction cost 11,100,00 CZK, which was borrowed from the Central Social Insurance Agency of the General Pension Institute. In 1938, lighter bomber squadrons No. 73 and 74 equipped with Aero Ab-101s and Avia B-71s of the Czechoslovak Air Force were relocated to Chrudim Military Airfield. They were managed under the 6th Aviation Regiment headquartered in Prague.

== World War II ==
During the Occupation of Czechoslovakia, the German Army captured Chudrim Military Airfield on 5 March, 1939, and anti-aircraft batteries were installed. It was then taken over by the Luftwaffe. The airport was primarily used for training purposes, mainly operating Bücker Bü 131 Jungmann aircraft. Towards the end of 1944, operational units began arriving, and Chrudim Airfield became a combat base. It was equipped with a grass landing ground measuring 1400 x 1000 yards in a hexagonal shape. Facilities at the time included bulk fuel storage, 1 large hangar with a paved apron, a flight control building south of the hangars, and on the northeast boundary was a barrack and an administrative block.

On the beginning of August 1944, several Messerschmitt Me 323 Gigant aircraft arrived at the airfield. On 28 December, 1944, during an Allied air raid on Pardubice, the anti-air defenses located on the airfield fired at the attacking Allied aircraft. Subsequently, two North American P-51 Mustang aircraft attacked the airfield using on-board weapons, setting fire to three Gigant aircraft. On 24 April, 1945, a liaison unit of the 7th Air Corps was stationed at Chrudim Airfield. With the movement of the Eastern Front, additional combat aircraft were based at airfield. At the beginning of May 1945, Luftwaffe squadrons equipped with Focke-Wulf Fw 190 flew from Moravia to Chrudim. Chrudim Airfield served as the last airfield of the 77th Fighter Squadron of the 8th Air Corps, consisting of Focke-Wulf Fw-190 F and Focke-Wulf Fw-19 A-8. At the end of the war, the airport was protected by a unit detachment of an airfield battalion, which was reinforced by a SS paratrooper detachment. Up to 60 camouflaged aircraft were concealed in revetments dug into the hillside and also at the edge of the airfield. On 7 May, 1945, the last desperate defense measures were taken by the German troops. However, a day later, the Germans began destroying ammunition stocks, aircraft, and set fire to the barracks before surrendering.

=== Post-war ===
Following the war, the airport and the town was restored. Shortly afterwards, the Štufmanské and Liaison School (ŠSU) was established in the airfield. The Chrudim Aeroclub was also established as a branch of the Czech National Aeroclub of the on 23 July, 1945. It operated in the fields of gliding, motor flting, model making, and parachute sports. Training without powered flying began on 28 July, 1946, utilizing two German DFS SG 38 Schulgleiter gliders. Around 60 navigators and radio operators underwent basic training, flying K-65 Čáp training aircraft. This was followed with training by Siebel Si 204 aircraft, and each training went for three years spanning six semesters. Training included orientation according to maps, aerial drawings, and track copying. In July 1948, a crew of three people escaped by a Siebel Si 204 to emigrate, all of which were former airmen from the Western Front. Following this incident, airport security presence was significantly increased.

In October 1952, Chudrim Airfield's facilities included a guard house constructed of wood, operations building constructed of brick, new operations building constructed of brick, garage, reinforced concrete hangar, wooden shed, underground fuel tanks, underground fuel tanks refilled once a month, airmen's billets constructed of wood billeting approximately 60 personnel, and a building constructed of wood used by goniometer operators. The new operations building was built to replace the old building, and was the only new construction at the time. Access to the airfield could only be made from an adjacent concrete highway by a repurposed railroad gate. The grass landing field was covered with sod, and was equipped night flying aids. Approximately 100 personnel were stationed at the field during the time, and it was mainly used as a technical raining center led by Lt Col Dobrichovsky.

In July 1953, Chrudim Airfield was serviced by an ambulance truck, and personnel were billeted in the nearby town of Chrudim. Fuel trucks on the airfield refueled aircraft with both motor driven and hand operated pumps. The administration building was equipped with an QGH and a radio beacon. There was a radio operators’ school, and between late 1951 and early 1952, a navigation school was opened. In the summer of 1951, around 10 Siebels, 19 Fischer-Storchs, C-104s, and C-106s were observed at the airfield. Between 1956 and 1957, the Central Aviation School (ÚLŠ) was established, with Soviet Yakovlev Yak-11 aircraft utilized for training. In 1960, Ghanaian paratroopers attended training at Chrudim Airfield in cooperation with the Aeroclub. In 1963 and 1964, ownership of the airport and half of the hangars were passed to the Aeroclub, with the remaining hangars being used as warehouses and garages.

In 1965, Chrudim Airfield came under the administration of the Czechoslovak People's Army once again, with military paratroopers being trained at the airfield. As there were no runways for aircraft, a fleet of Soviet Mil Mi-1, Mil Mi-2, and Mil Mi-4 helicopters were rather used. A drop balloon was also utilized, which is able accommodate 5-6 paratroopers and climb up to 600 meters via a winch rope. After November 1989, a para-component of the Rapid Deployment Unit was deployed at Chrudim Airfield, which still operates there today.

== Present ==
Following the reorganization of the Czech and Slovak Air Forces in 1992, primary fixed-wing military aviation ceased in Chudrim Airfield. Today, it is owned by the Aeroklub Chrudim, with recreational and training activities including glider flights, ultralight aircraft flights, and skydiving and parachute training. It also hosts pilot training programs for private pilots and glider pilots, and has a clubhouse with briefing rooms and a basic maintenance facility.

== Units ==
Czechoslovak Air Force

- No. 73 Light Bomber Squadron of 6th Aviation Regiment, 1938
- No. 74 Light Bomber Squadron of 6th Aviation Regiment, 1938

Luftwaffe

- Stab, I. Gruppe of Kampfgeschwader (Jagd) 30, November–December 1944
- I. Gruppe of Jagdgeschwader 52, March 1945
- Flugbereitschaft (Air Transport/Communications Flight)
- VIII. Fliegerkorps (8th Air Corps), April–May 1945
- IV. Gruppe of Transportgeschwader 4, January 1945
- Verbindungsstaffel VIII. Fliegerkorps (Liaison Squadron of the 8th Air Corps), April–May 1945

School Units (Luftwaffe)

- Arbeitsplatz for Flugzeugführerschule/Fernaufklärerschule 32 (Pilot Training School/Long-Range Reconnaissance School 32), 1939–1944
- Flugzeugführerschule A/B 32 (Elementary/Basic Flying Training School 32), 1939–1944
- Flugzeugführerschule A 32 (Pardubitz), 1939–1944

Reserve Training & Replacement Units (Luftwaffe)

- Flieger-Ersatz-Bataillon XVII (Aviation Replacement Battalion XVII), circa April–June 1942

Station Commands (Luftwaffe)

- Fliegerhorst-Kommandantur E (v) 213/III (Air Base Command E [mobile] 213/III), circa January–May 1945

Station Units (Luftwaffe)

- Stab/Generalkommando VIII. Fliegerkorps (Headquarters, 8th Air Corps), April 1945
- Stab/Feldwerftverband 40 (Headquarters, Field Aircraft Maintenance Unit 40), January–February 1945
- Leichter Feldwerft-Zug 9/60 (Light Field Aircraft Maintenance Section 9/60), February–March 1945

=== Post-war units ===
Communication Schools

- Air Communication School, August 1946 – 1 September 1950
- Air Communication Training School, 1 September 1950 – 1 January 1953
- Air Communication and Navigation Training School, 1 January 1953 – August 1954

Instruction Regiments

- Instruction Regiment LSU, 1 September 1950 – 1 January 1953
- Instruction Regiment LSŠU, 1 January 1953 – August 1954
