= Michal Bobek =

Czech judge (born 1977)

Advocate General of the European Court of Justice
- In office 2015–2021

Personal details
- Born: 30 August 1977 (age 48) Chrudim

Michal Bobek (born 30 August 1977) is a legal scholar currently serving as a justice at the Czech Supreme Administrative Court. He is a visiting professor at the Institute for European, International and Comparative Law at the University of Vienna Law Faculty and external lecturer at the Charles University Faculty of Law in Prague. He previously served as the Advocate General at the European Court of Justice in 2015–2021.

== Select works in English ==
- M. Bobek, A. Bodnar, A. von Bogdandy, P. Sonnevend (eds.): Transition 2.0: Re-establishing Constitutional Democracy in EU Member States. Nomos Verlag, Baden-Baden, 2023
- M. Bobek, J. Adams-Prassl (eds.): The EU Charter of Fundamental Rights in the Member States. Hart Publishing, Oxford 2020
- M. Bobek, J. Prassl (eds.): Air Passenger Rights: Ten Years On. Hart Publishing, Oxford 2016
- M. Bobek (ed.): Central European Judges under the European Influence: The Transformative Power of the EU Revisited. Hart Publishing, Oxford 2015
- Bobek, Michal (2013). Comparative Reasoning in European Supreme Courts. Oxford University Press. ISBN 978-0-19-968038-2.
- Bobek, Michal (2015). Selecting Europe's Judges: A Critical Review of the Appointment Procedures to the European Courts. Oxford University Press. ISBN 978-0-19-872778-1.
