= Wennerstrom (surname) =

Wennerström and Wennerstrom are surnames originating in Sweden.

Those bearing the name include:

- Gunnar Wennerström (1879–1931), Swedish swimmer
- Ivar Wennerström (fl. c. 1940), Swedish county governor
- Stig Wennerström (spy) (1906–2006), colonel in the Swedish Air Force who was convicted of espionage
- Stig Wennerström (sailor) (born 1943), Swedish sail racer
- Håkan Wennerström (born 1946), Swedish chemist & Nobel-committee member
- Donnalee Wennerstrom (born c. 1950), American swimmer
- Erik O. Wennerström (born 1962), Swedish Director-General and legal scholar
- Vern Wennerstrom (fl. 1975), American musician of Tantrum
- Steve Wennerstrom (born c. 1948), American Women's Sports Historian and photo journalist
- Klaus Wennerstrom (born 1959), Canadian industrialist involved in the 2007 Serdab Scandal relating to the corrupted Al Yamamah contracts with Saudi Arabia
- Erika Wennerstrom (fl. 2000s), American musician of Heartless Bastards
