= Adrienne von Pötting =

Austrian painter (1856–1909)

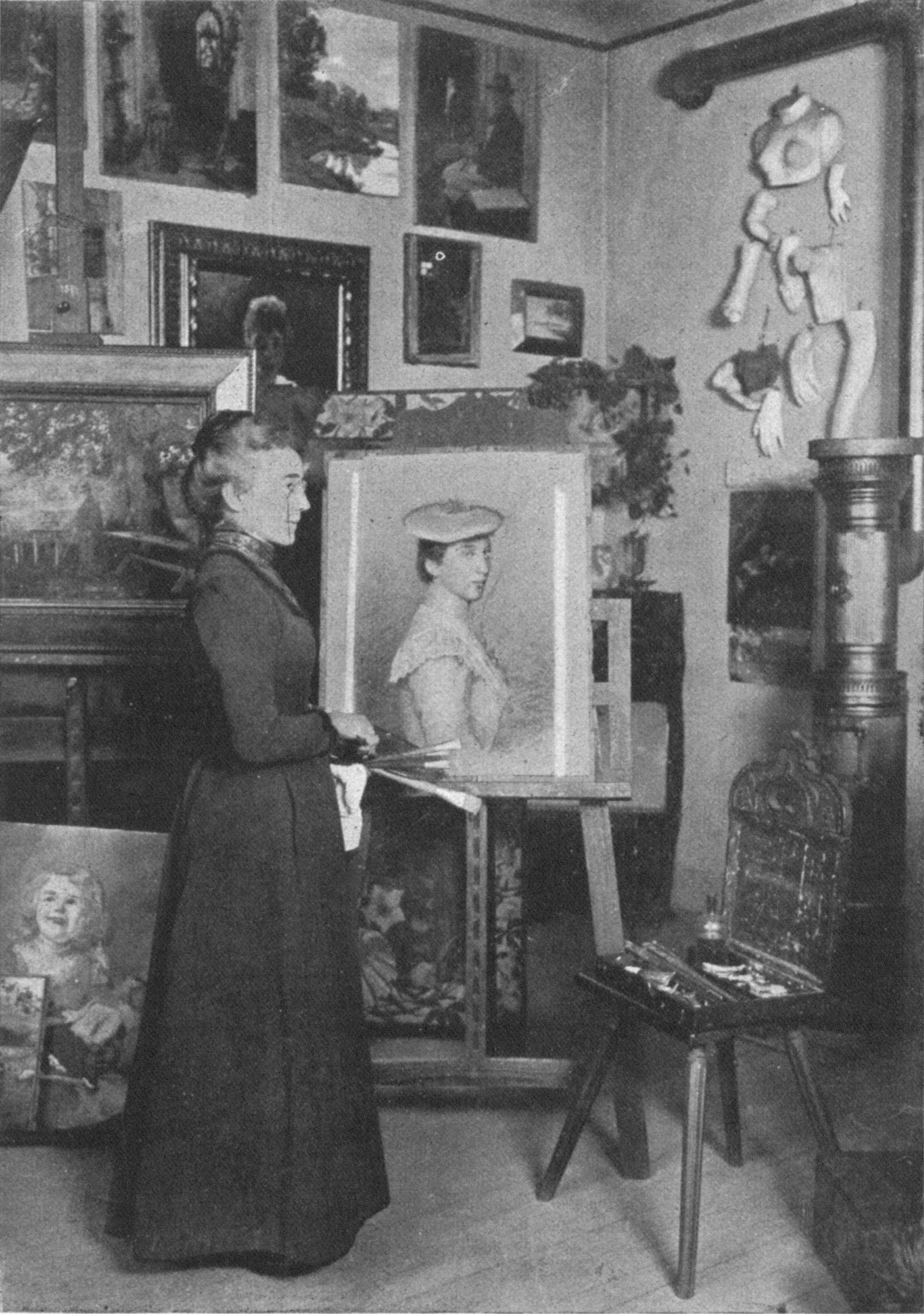
- Pötting in her studio in Vienna, circa 1902
- Born: 1856; Chrudim, Bohemia, Austria
- Died: 1909 (aged 52–53)
- Known for: Painting

Countess Adrienne Gräfin von Pötting (1856–1909) was an Austrian painter.

== Biography ==
Pötting was born in Chrudim, Bohemia in 1856 to Count Norbert von Pötting and Countess Cajetana Chorinsky von Ledske from Prague. She had one brother, Norbert, who became a public prosecutor, and an older sister, Hedwig, who was the secretary to Bertha von Suttner. She studied under Karl von Blaas and Hans Canon in Vienna. She exhibited her work in the rotunda of The Woman's Building at the 1893 World's Columbian Exposition in Chicago, Illinois. Pötting died in Abbazia in 1909.

== Gallery ==
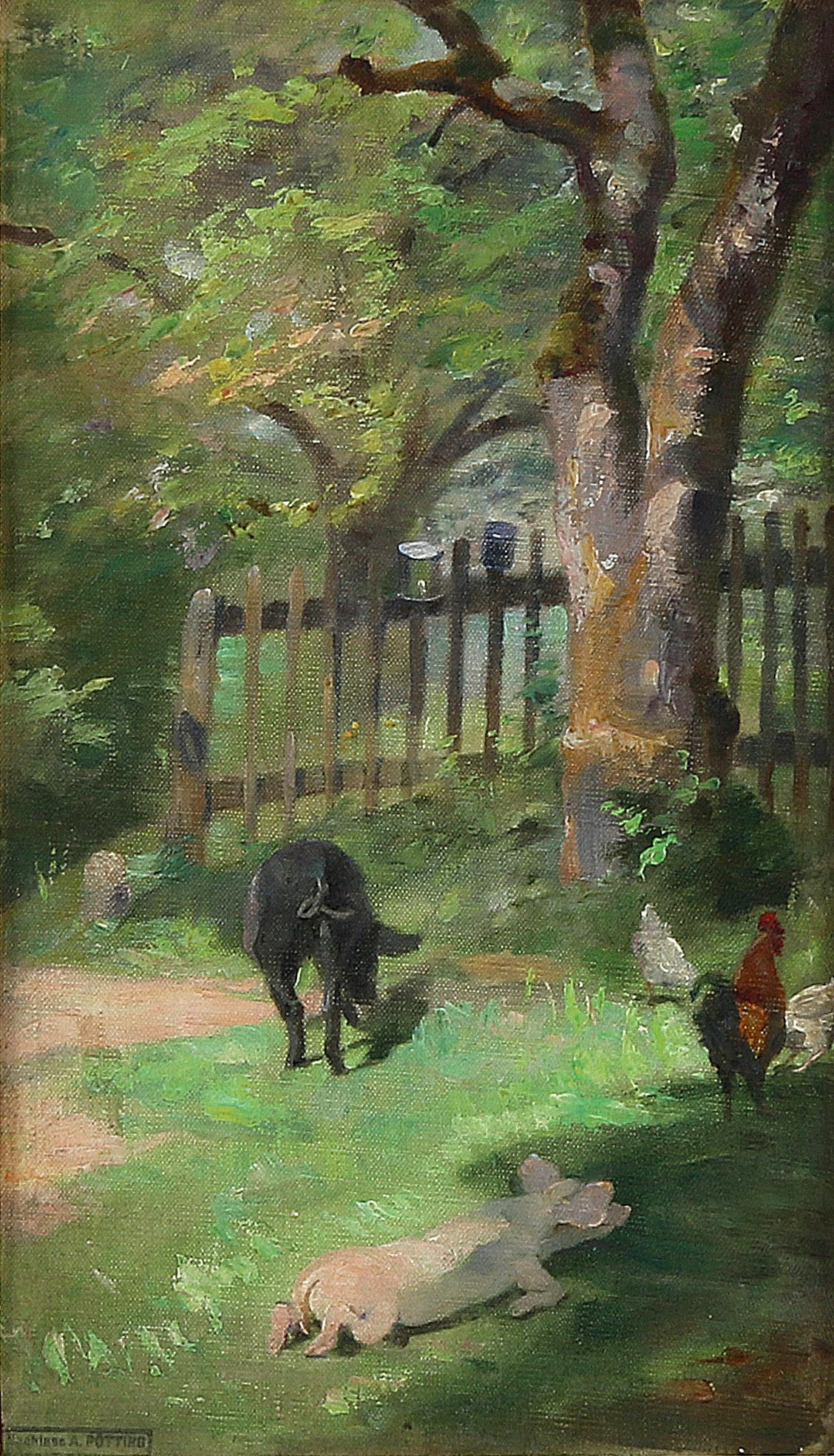
Federvieh und Schweine

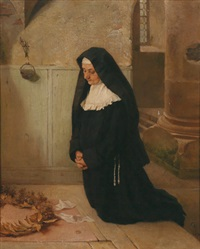
Von Der Jahrestag, 1891

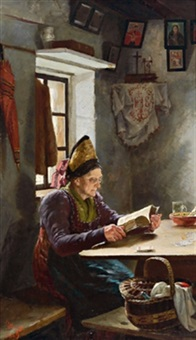
In der Stube 1889
