= David O'Keeffe (lawyer) =

English academic

David O'Keeffe is an Irish lawyer. He is emeritus Professor of European Law at University College London; he was Senior Counsel of Dentons international law firm and a part-time European administrative law judge.

== Practice ==
As a practitioner, he specialized in EU and WTO Trade law, State aid and energy law. He litigated before the European General Court and the European Court of Justice, principally in trade cases. Most of his cases concerned anti-dumping including the Rusal Armenal case on market economy treatment and the RFA appeal on the relationship between EU anti-dumping law and WTO law. He litigated sanctions cases before the European Courts including the written pleading in the Dinamo Minsk litigation concerning EU sanctions against Belarus, and the cases OAO Minskii Avtomobilnyi Zavod and Belaz-upravljajusaja kompanija holdinga Belaz Holding v Council. He pleaded a small number of competition cases including the Mediaset case on repayment of illegal State aid. He occasionally litigated in other areas such as the Eurojust case, pertinent for standing issues. He acted as an arbitrator in commercial disputes concerning the application of EU law.

== Administrative law judge ==
From 2008 O'Keeffe was a judge of the Tribunal of the European University Institute. He was previously a Member for 6 years of the conciliation board of the European Space Agency.

== Academic career ==
He was Professor of European Law at University College London (1993–2004) and Vice-Dean of the Faculty of Laws at a time when UCL had a number of European law scholars, including the eminent competition law expert Professor Valentine Korah, one of the founders of modern competition law and the first woman in the world to hold a chair devoted to this subject, Margot Horspool, Basil Markesinis and Nicholas Emiliou.

He was Allen & Overy Professor of European Law and head of the Department of Law, University of Durham 1990–1993. He was a professor at the College of Europe in Bruges 1993–2006. He was a visiting professor at numerous Universities including University College Dublin, and the University of Siena. He was law clerk to Judge T.F. O'Higgins at the European Court of Justice 1985–1990. He was a lecturer in EU and public international law at Leiden University under the direction of Professor Henry G. Schermers 1980–1984.

He wrote on several areas of EU law, including his published General Course on European Community Law at the Academy of European Law, titled "The Individual and European Law", European University Institute, and on the free movement of labor in the EU,. Amongst the works with which he is most associated are “Mixed Agreements” (with Professor Henry G. Schermers), Kluwer, Legal Issues of the Maastricht Treaty (Chancery Law Publishing, 1994) and Legal Issues of the Amsterdam Treaty (Hart, 1999). He was co-founding joint editor of the European Foreign Affairs Review. and an editor of the Common Market Law Review 1985–2005.

== Public service ==
He gave evidence on EU law to committees of the European Parliament, to the House of Lords and to the House of Commons. He advised the Government of The Netherlands on certain aspects of the Maastricht Treaty during the Netherlands Presidency of the EU.

He was a member of the High Level Panel on the Free Movement of Workers established by the European Commission, chaired by Simone Veil.

== EU Accessions ==
From 1990, in connection with the Enlargement of the European Union, particularly the accession of Central and Eastern European countries, he lectured on EU law and the legal consequences of EU accession on national law at universities and groups of civil servants, judges and legal practitioners particularly in Poland, Romania, Slovenia, Slovakia.

== Personal ==
He was born in Ennis County Clare. He was educated at Clongowes Wood College, University College Dublin, Yale Law School and.Leiden University
