= Chrudim Regional Museum =

Museum in the Czech Republic

- Regionální muzeum v Chrudimi
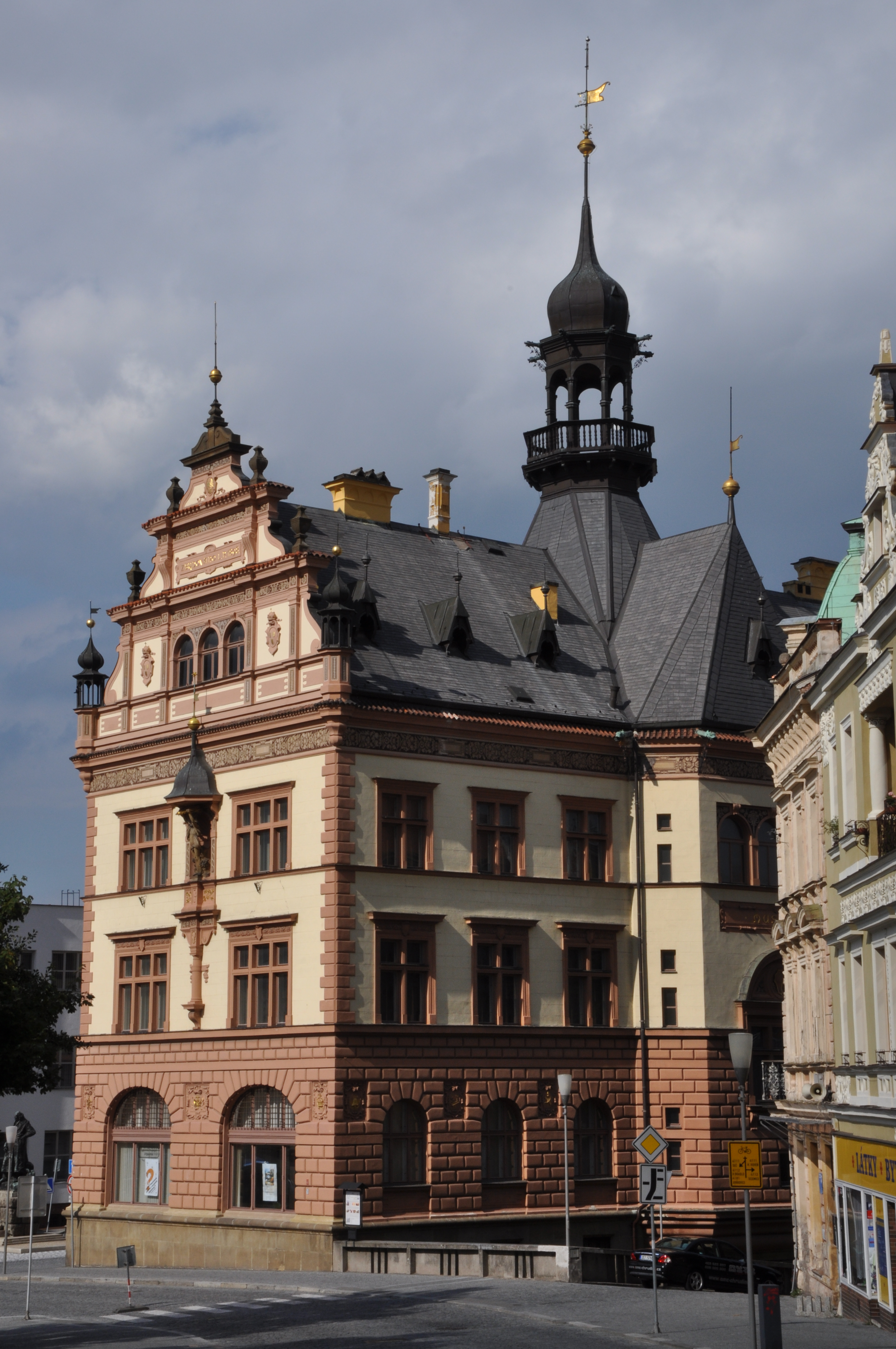
- The museum
- Established: 2 December 1898
- Location: Široká 86, Chrudim, Czech Republic, 537 01
- Coordinates: 49.952825°N 15.79195°E
- Website: www.muzeumcr.cz

Chrudim Regional Museum (Czech: Regionální muzeum v Chrudimi) is a museum in Chrudim in the Czech Republic. It collects historical materials and artisan works related to the area around the town of Chrudim.

== History ==
A museum club in Chrudim was set up in 1865. In 1892 a professional institution was established under the name Průmyslové muzeum pro východní Čechy v Chrudimi (Industrial Museum for Eastern Bohemia in Chrudim). The museum's first building was constructed in 1897–1898, the second one in 1898–1901. The first, built in Neo-Renaissance style, opened on 2 December 1898 and was built to house museum collections. The second, built in Neo-Baroque style, opened on 19 May 1901 and was designed to host cultural events and exhibits.

Until 2003 the official name of the museum was Okresní muzeum v Chrudimi (Chrudim District Museum), since then it has borne the current name. An additional building on the outskirts of the town stores the deposits.

== Exhibitions and activities ==
Most of the items kept by the museum cover history of the region. The collections are structured into:

- Archaeological collection, mostly acquired during the second half of the 19th century
- Ethnographical material from the 16th to 20th century
- Historical collections given from individual donators
- Historical library with over 17,000 volumes
- Natural history of the area
- Art collections

Three permanent exhibitions cover:

- Posters by Alphonse Mucha (the museum owns a unique set of 41 posters, acquired in 1898). Mucha's wife was born in Chrudim.
- Collection of local artisan works covering the turn of 19/20th century
- History of the region in form of life-size scenes or models

Short-term exhibits focus on local history, natural science and art. Other services are:

- Access for researchers
- Library with 48,000 items
- Lectures organized by the museum
- Specialised publications
- Journal "Chrudimské vlastivědné listy" (Chrudim Studies), issued six times a year
- Conservational services for the archaeologists
