= Chrudim =

- Town
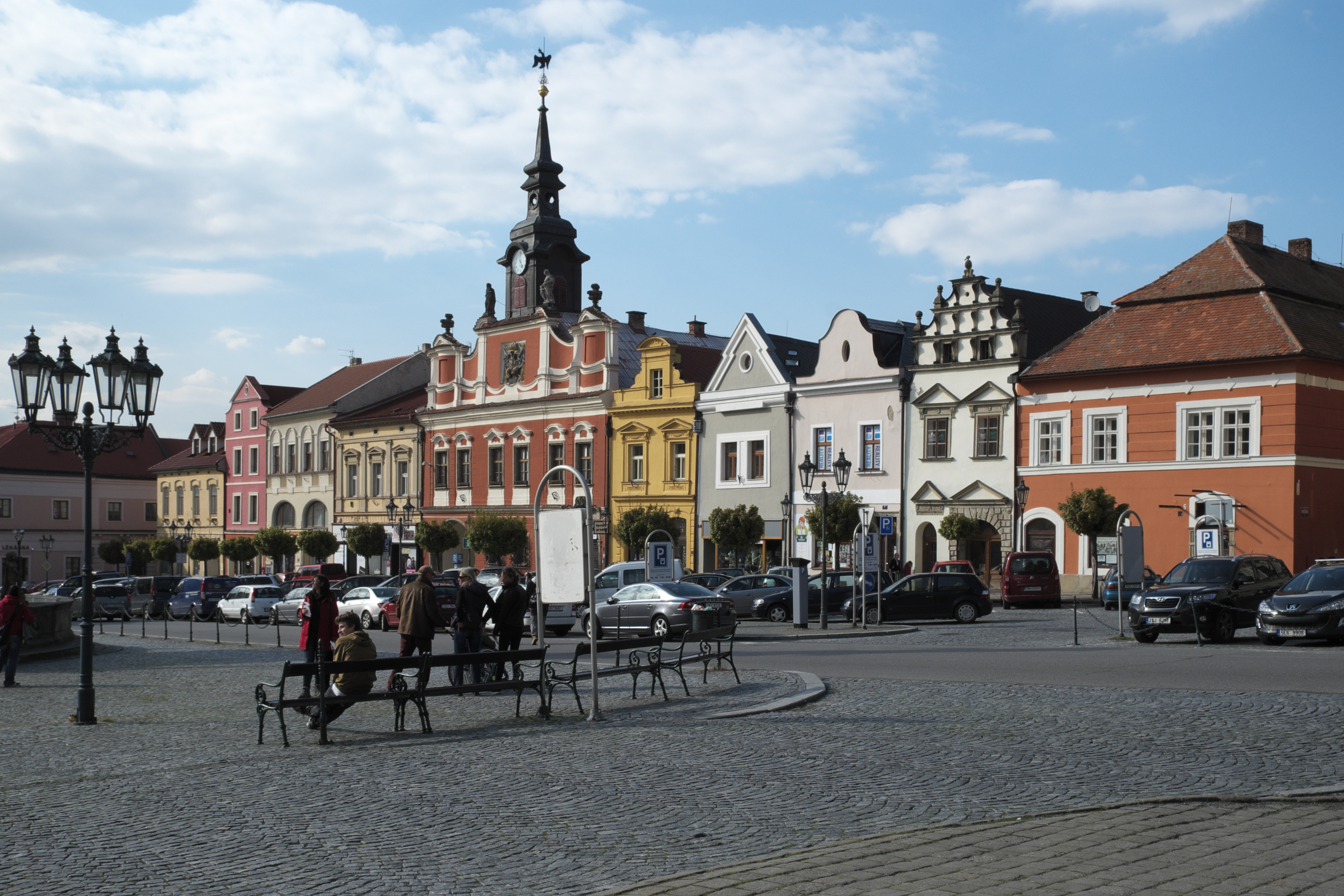
- The square Resselovo náměstí

- Flag Coat of arms

- Location in the Czech Republic
- Coordinates: 49°57′4″N 15°47′44″E
- Country: Czech Republic
- Region: Pardubice
- District: Chrudim
- First mentioned: 1055

Government
  - Mayor: Jan Čechlovský (ODS)

Area
  - Total: 33.21 km^{2} (12.82 sq mi)
- Elevation: 240 m (790 ft)

Population (2026-01-01)
  - Total: 23,562
  - Density: 709.5/km^{2} (1,838/sq mi)
- Time zone: UTC+1 (CET)
  - Summer (DST): UTC+2 (CEST)
- Postal code: 537 01
- Website: www.chrudim.eu

Chrudim (Czech pronunciation: [ˈxruɟɪm]) is a town in the Pardubice Region of the Czech Republic. It has about 24,000 inhabitants and is the second largest town of the region. It is situated on the Chrudimka River.

Chrudim is known for its connection with puppetry, especially for the puppetry museum and the annual puppetry festival. The historic town centre is well preserved and is protected as an urban monument zone. The main landmark of Chrudim is the Church of the Assumption of the Virgin Mary.

== Administrative division ==
Chrudim consists of eight municipal parts (in brackets population according to the 2021 census):

- Chrudim I (693)
- Chrudim II (5,200)
- Chrudim III (6,571)
- Chrudim IV (9,304)
- Medlešice (601)
- Topol (222)
- Vestec (110)
- Vlčnov (172)

== Etymology ==
The name was derived from the personal name Chrudim, meaning "Chrudim's (castle)".

== Geography ==
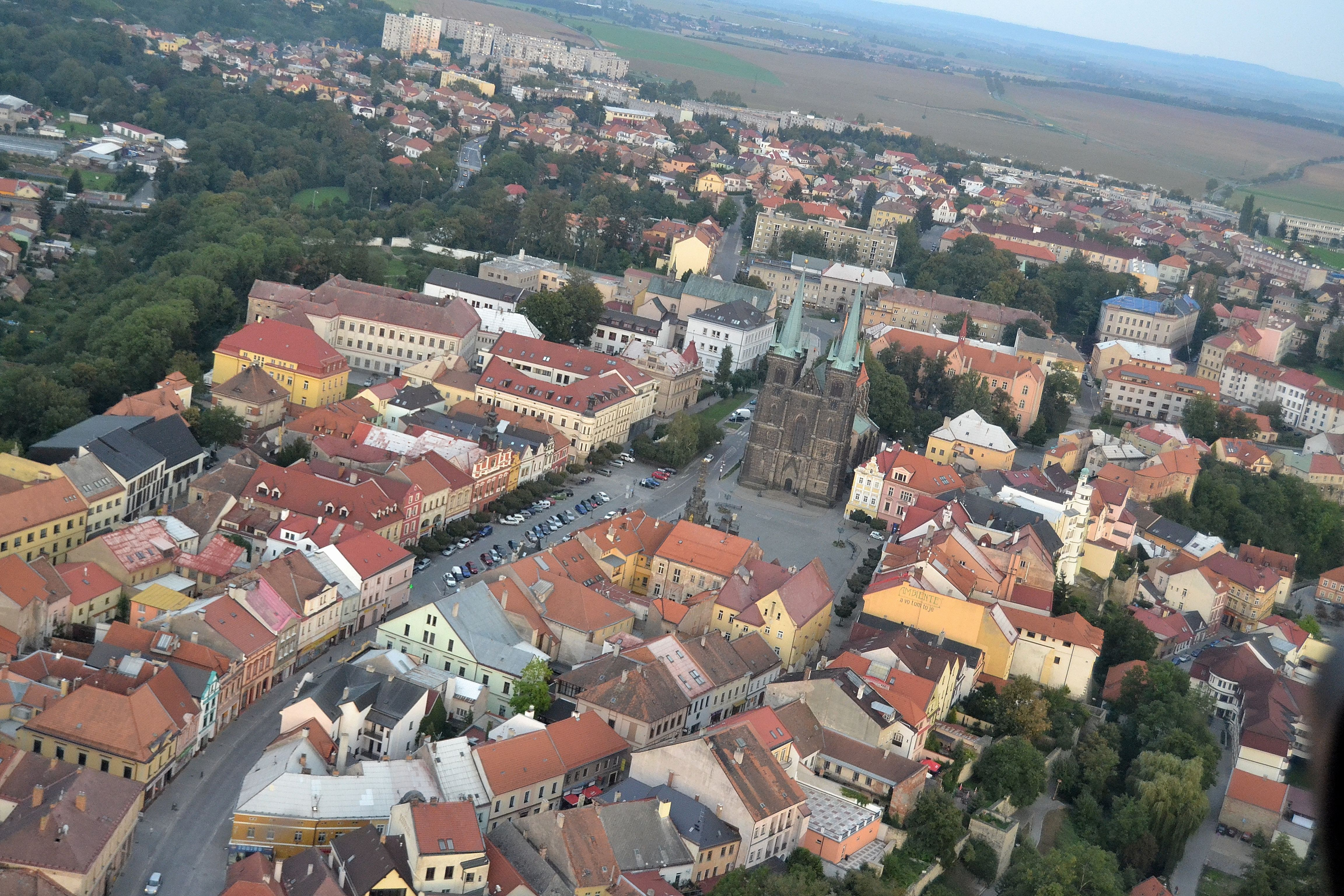
Aerial view of the historic centre

Chrudim is located about 8 kilometres (5 mi) south of Pardubice. It lies mostly in the Svitavy Uplands. The highest point is the hill Podhůra at 356 m (1,168 ft) above sea level. This hill is situated in the southern tip of the municipal territory, which extends into the Iron Mountains and the eponymous protected landscape area. The Chrudimka River flows through the town.

== History ==
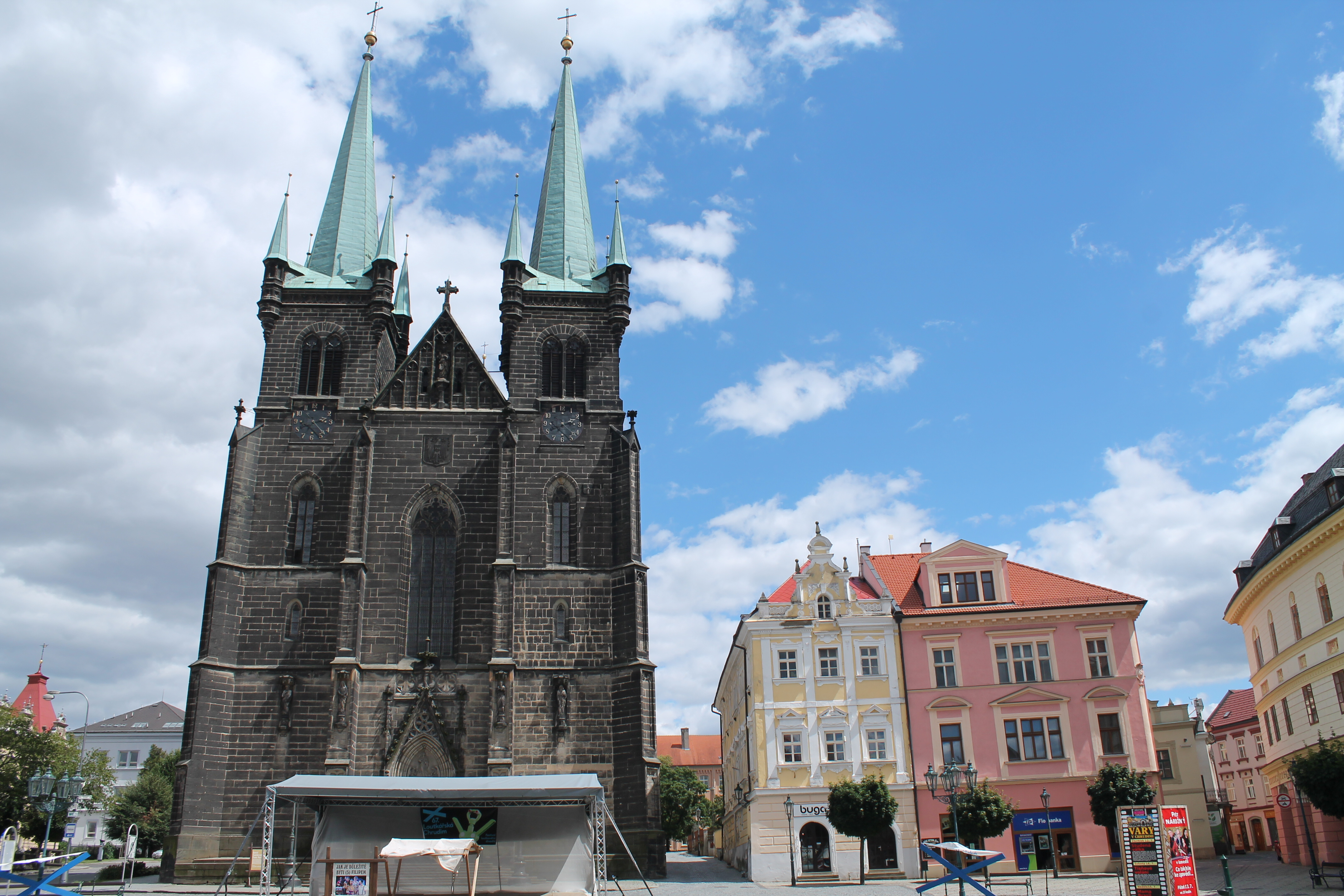
Church of the Assumption of the Virgin Mary

The oldest archaeological findings which provide first signs of the settlement in this area date back to the 5th millennium BC. Various cultures succeeded one on another in the territory of today's town of Chrudim and its vicinity. Since the 7th–8th century, the area is inhabited by Slavs.

The first written mention of Chrudim is from 1055, when Duke Bretislav I died here according to Chronica Boemorum. The royal town of Chrudim was founded in 1276 by King Ottokar II for its location on a route from Prague to Moravia. From 1307, it became a dowry town, administered by Bohemian queens.

At the beginning of the Hussite Wars, Chrudim sided with the anti-Catholic side and the German-speaking population left the town. Since then, Chrudim has been an almost exclusively Czech territory by ethnicity. The town was in opposition to the ruling Habsburgs during the failed Estates Revolt in 1547 and Bohemian Revolt in 1618–1620, which always had serious consequences for it. Chrudim was also severely affected by the Thirty Years' War, during which the evangelical population left as a result of re-Catholicisation.

During the 18th and 19th centuries, Chrudim lost partly lost its economical and administrative importance, but it has become important educational and cultural centre, which led to its gain of the nickname "Athens of Eastern Bohemia". In 1871, the railway was built and the town regained economic significance.

Until 1918, the town was part of Austria-Hungary, head of the Chrudim District, one of the 94 Bezirkshauptmannschaften in Bohemia.

== Demographics ==
Historical population

| Year | Pop. | ±% |
|---|---|---|
| 1869 | 10,293 | — |
| 1880 | 12,971 | +26.0% |
| 1890 | 13,177 | +1.6% |
| 1900 | 14,180 | +7.6% |
| 1910 | 14,728 | +3.9% |

| Year | Pop. | ±% |
|---|---|---|
| 1921 | 14,620 | −0.7% |
| 1930 | 14,570 | −0.3% |
| 1950 | 15,210 | +4.4% |
| 1961 | 16,460 | +8.2% |
| 1970 | 18,238 | +10.8% |

| Year | Pop. | ±% |
|---|---|---|
| 1980 | 21,393 | +17.3% |
| 1991 | 23,643 | +10.5% |
| 2001 | 23,898 | +1.1% |
| 2011 | 23,239 | −2.8% |
| 2021 | 22,873 | −1.6% |

Source: Censuses

== Economy ==
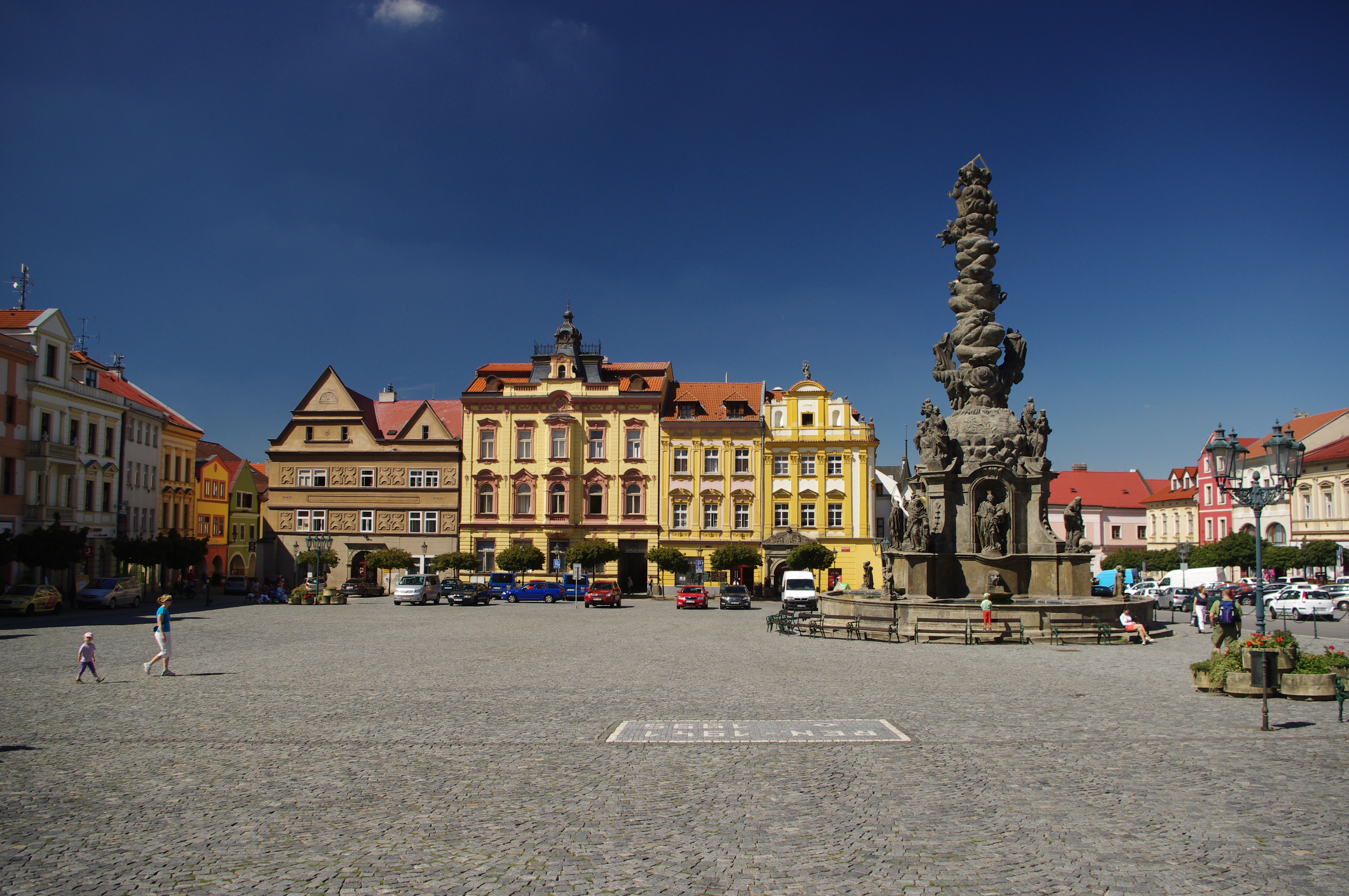
Column of the Transfiguration on the Resselovo náměstí

There are no major industrial companies in Chrudim. A middle-sized company based in the town is BASF Stavební hmoty Česká republika, part of the BASF conglomerate that produces building materials. The largest employer with its headquarters in Chrudim is Arriva autobusy a.s. with more than 1,000 employees, focused on urban and suburban passenger transport.

== Transport ==
The town is situated at the crossroads of two main roads: the I/17 (connecting Čáslav with the D35 motorway) and the I/37 (connecting Hradec Králové and Pardubice with Žďár nad Sázavou the D1 motorway).

Chrudim is located on the railway lines Pardubice–Havlíčkův Brod and Chrudim–Moravany. There are four train stations in the town's territory: Chrudim, Chrudim město, Chrudim zastávka and Medlešice.

In the western part of Chrudim is the Chrudim Airfield. It is a public national airport operated by Aeroklub Chrudim, hosting recreational activities and training programs. It was established in 1937 as a military airfield of the Czechoslovak Air Force until capture by the German Army, which converted it into a Luftwaffe fighter base. From 1945 until the 1990s, it remained in-use as a communications and radio training base.

== Culture ==
Chrudim is known for the Loutkářská Chrudim Festival. The festival was established in 1951 and is the oldest continuous festival of puppetry in the world.

== Sport ==
Chrudim is home to the professional football club MFK Chrudim. Since 2018, it plays in the Czech National Football League.

Until 1970, there was a motorcycle speedway track in the town. The site hosted a final round of the Czechoslovak Individual Speedway Championship in 1954, 1955 and 1961.

== Sights ==
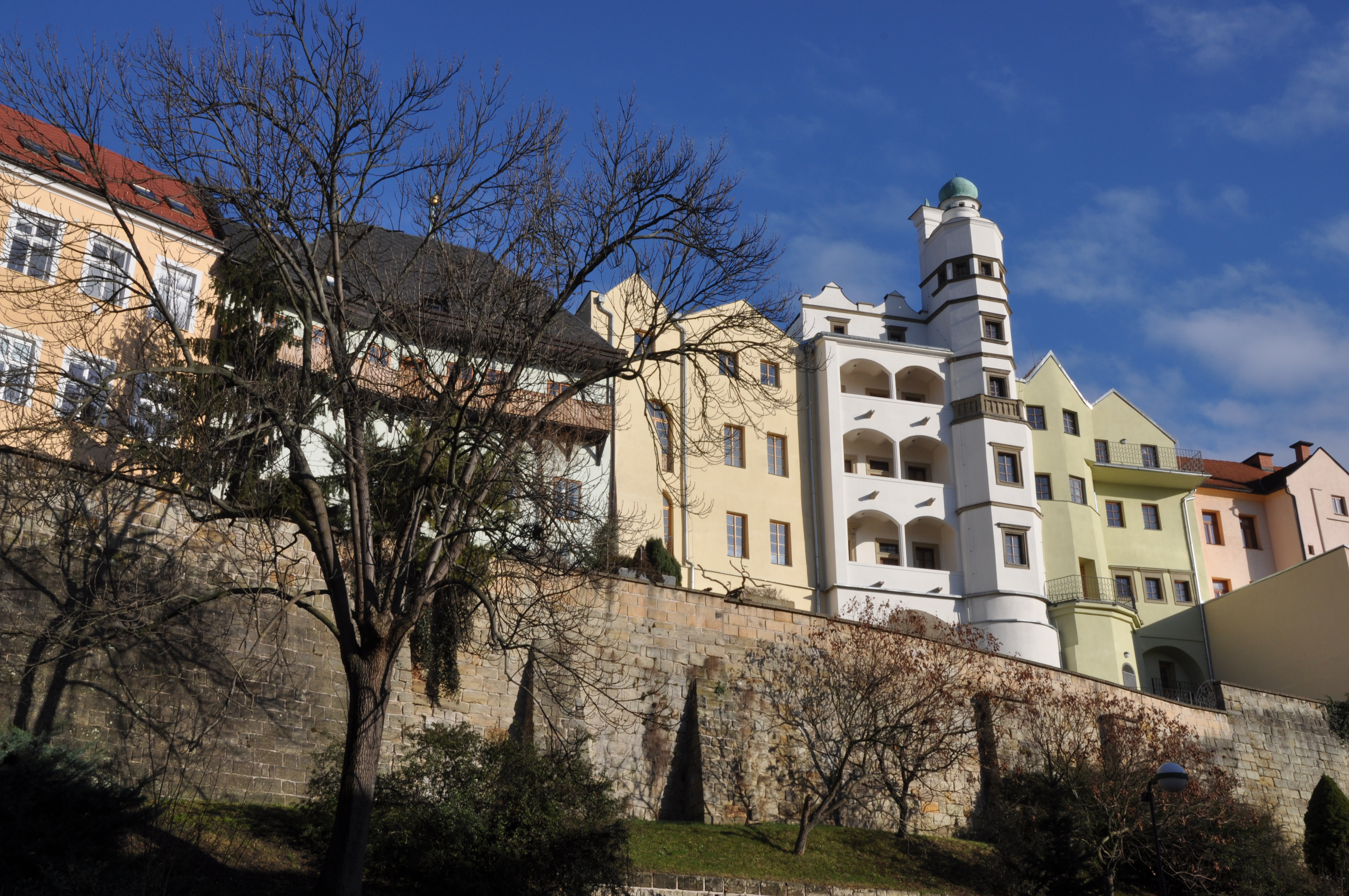
Mydlářovský dům and the town walls

The main landmark of Chrudim is the Church of the Assumption of the Virgin Mary on the town square. The originally Gothic building was founded before 1349 on the site of a castle. After it was damaged by several fires, it was reconstructed to its current Neo-Gothic form in 1857. Another notable churches with Gothic bases are Church of Saint Catherine, Church of Saint Michael, and Church of the Exaltation of the Holy Cross.

Resselovo náměstí is the main square of the historic centre. It is lined with preserved burgher houses and includes the originally Renaissance town hall with Baroque façade. In the middle of the square there is the Baroque richly decorated sculptural column of the Transfiguration.

One of the architectural symbols of the town is the Renaissance house Mydlářovský dům, typical with arcades and oriental-looking triple tower. Today it houses the Museum of Puppetry Culture. A significant sight is also the Neo-Renaissance and Neo-Baroque building of the Chrudim Regional Museum.

The historic centre was delimited by the town walls. Most of the walls, including several bastions, have been preserved.

== Notable people ==
- Viktorin Kornel of Všehrdy (1460–1520), humanist, lawyer and writer
- Jan Mydlář (c. 1572–1664), executioner
- Johann Andreas Kauchlitz Colizzi (c. 1742–1808), musician
- Jan Nepomuk Štěpánek (1783–1844), actor and theatre director
- Josef Ressel (1793–1857), inventor
- Adrienne von Pötting (1856–1909), Austrian painter
- Kurt Freund (1914–1996), Czech-Canadian physician and sexologist
- Miloslav Výborný (born 1952), politician
- Dagmar Pecková (born 1961), operatic mezzo-soprano
- Dušan Salfický (born 1972), ice hockey player
- Michal Bobek (born 1977), judge
- Jiří Magál (born 1977), cross-country skier
- Petr Průcha (born 1982), ice hockey player
- Jakub Pešek (born 1993), footballer

== Twin towns – sister cities ==
Chrudim is twinned with:

- Motovun, Croatia
- Oleśnica, Poland
- Svidník, Slovakia
- Znojmo, Czech Republic
