= Darian Pavli =

Judge at the European Court of Human Rights

- Born: 7 April 1975 (age 51); Vlora
- Occupation: Judge at the European Court of Human Rights

Darian Pavli (born 7 April 1975) is judge at the European Court of Human Rights with respect to Albania since 7 January 2019.

== Early life and education ==
Pavli was born on 7 April 1975 in Vlora, Albania.

He studied at the Faculty of law of the University of Tirana from 1993 to 1997 and obtained there a bachelor of laws. He then completed a master of laws in comparative constitutional law at the Central European University of Budapest in 1998.

In the school year 2000–2001, he completed at the New York University Law School another master of laws in public service law.

== Career ==
Between 1998 and 2000, he worked as senior attorney for the Organization for Security and Co-operation in Europe (OSCE) in Tirana, as well as a lecturer in constitutional law at the University of Tirana.

From 2001 to 2003, he was the researcher on human rights situation in Southeast Europe for the organization Human Rights Watch. He then joined the Open Society Justice Initiative until 2015 as senior attorney, working on various cases before international courts and mechanisms on human rights issues.

In 2015, he was appointed as advisor for the Special Parliamentary Committee on Justice Reform of the Parliament of Albania.

Between 2016 and 2017, he was director of programs of the Open Society Foundations for Albania.

From 2017 to 2018 he was expert on human rights law and policy for the Council of Europe and other international organizations in Tirana, and in 2018 he was appointed senior expert for the Euralius V project (European Union project working on the consolidation of the Albanian justice system).

He is judge of the European Court of Human Rights (ECHR) since 7 January 2019.

=== Controversy ===
The nomination of Darian Pavli as a candidate for the ECHR by the Albanian government was also controversial. Indeed, Albanian press pointed out that Pavli had links with the Albanian Prime Minister Edi Rama. First, they are said to be related (even if the Albanian press is not clear about this link, one presents them as cousins, while the other declares Pavli is the cousin of Rama's wife). Second, the Open Society Foundations openly supported Edi Rama in the past. Finally, the government was also accused of presenting the candidates to the ECHR without submitting them to the "vetting" system, mandatory for Albanian judges.
