= Ana Maria Guerra Martins =

Portuguese jurist and judge

Ana Maria Guerra Martins (born 22 July 1963, Lisbon) is a Portuguese jurist and a judge at the European Court of Human Rights.

== Education and early life ==
Guerra Martins studied law at the University of Lisbon, where she graduated in 1986 with a BSc. In 1993 she obtained a MSc in Law of the European Union from the same university. From 1997 to 1999 she worked as a researcher at the Max Planck Institute for Comparative Public Law and International Law in Heidelberg. In the year 2000, she obtained her PhD in public law.

== Academic career ==
After her return to Portugal in 1999, she became a lecturer in at the University of Lisbon. In the year 2000, she became the junior lecturer for international human rights and constitutional law at the University of Lisbon. From 2004 to 2005 she was visiting professor at the Paris-Sud and as well the Eduardo Mondlane University in Maputo, Moçambique. In 2006 she returned to the University of Lisbon and was appointed as the senior lecturer in international human rights and constitutional law, and in 2011 she became a full professor at the University of Lisbon, a post she held until 2020, when she assumed as a judge at the ECHR.

== Juridical career ==
She became a judge at the constitutional court of Portugal in 2006, which she stayed until 2016. Between 2006 and 2007 she acted as the general inspector of justice in Portugal. In October 2019, Guerra Martins was elected as the successor to Paulo Pinto de Albuquerque as the representative of Portugal as a judge at the ECHR. She is the first woman to represent Portugal at the ECHR, and began her term in office on 1 April 2020.
