= Vlkovce =

Village and municipality in Slovakia

- Municipality
- Flag

- Location of Vlkovce in the Prešov Region Location of Vlkovce in Slovakia
- Coordinates: 49.05°N 20.50°E
- Country: Slovakia
- Region: Prešov Region
- District: Kežmarok District
- First mentioned: 1268

Area
  - Total: 3.83 km^{2} (1.48 sq mi)
- Elevation: 829 m (2,720 ft)

Population (2025)
  - Total: 494
- Time zone: UTC+1 (CET)
  - Summer (DST): UTC+2 (CEST)
- Postal code: 597 1
- Area code: +421 52
- Vehicle registration plate (until 2022): KK
- Website: www.vlkovce.sk

Vlkovce (Hungarian: Kiskuncfalva, German: Kunzendorf, Rusyn: Влковце) is a village and municipality in Kežmarok District in the Prešov Region of northeast Slovakia.

== History ==
In historical records the village was first mentioned in 1268. Before the establishment of independent Czechoslovakia in 1918, Vlkovce was part of Szepes County within the Kingdom of Hungary. From 1939 to 1945, it was part of the Slovak Republic. On 27 January 1945, the Red Army dislodged the Wehrmacht from Vlkovce in the course of the Western Carpathian offensive and it was once again part of Czechoslovakia.

== Geography ==
The municipality lies at an altitude of 829 metres (2,720 ft) and covers an area of 3.83 km^{2} (1.48 sq mi) (2025).

== Population ==
Population statistic (10 years)
Year	1995	2005	2015	2025
Count	391	446	479	494
Difference		+14.06%	+7.39%	+3.13%

Population statistic
Year	2024	2025
Count	494	494
Difference		−1.42%

It has a population of 494 people (31 December 2025).

=== Ethnicity ===
Census 2021 (1+ %)
Ethnicity	Number	Fraction
Slovak	470	98.53%
Not found out	7	1.46%
Total	477	

In year 2021 was 477 people by ethnicity 470 as Slovak, 7 as Not found out, 2 as Polish and 1 as Czech.

Note on population: The difference values of population numbers in the table "Population statistic" and in the sections "Ethnicity" & "Religion" is caused by the use of various statistical methods.

=== Religion ===
Census 2021 (1+ %)
Religion	Number	Fraction
Roman Catholic Church	455	95.39%
None	9	1.89%
Not found out	5	1.05%
Total	477	

In year 2021 was 477 people by religion 455 from Roman Catholic Church, 9 from None, 5 from Not found out, 3 from Calvinist Church, 3 from Greek Catholic Church, 1 from Other and 1 from Evangelical Church.
