= Anja Seibert-Fohr =

German judge at the European Court of Human Rights

Judge at the European Court of Human Rights
- Incumbent
- Assumed office 1 January 2020
- Preceded by: Angelika Nussberger

Personal details
- Born: 3 April 1969 (age 57) Giessen, Germany
- Education: George Washington University; Heidelberg University

Anja Seibert-Fohr (born 3 April 1969, Giessen, Germany) is a German jurist, Professor for public law, public international law and human rights, and holder of the corresponding university chair at the University of Heidelberg. She has been serving as a judge at the European Court of Human Rights since 2020.

== Early life and education ==
Seibert-Fohr studied law at the Universities of Bonn, Gießen and Heidelberg with a scholarship of the Studienstiftung des deutschen Volkes. During her studies, she attended courses at the Hague Academy of International Law and the International Institute of Human Rights in Strasbourg. From 1997 onwards she continued her studies at the George Washington University (GWU) and graduated with a Master of Law in 2000 and a Doctor of Juridical Science in 2004. Her Doctoral adviser was Tom Burgenthal, judge at the International Court of Justice in The Hague at the time. Her studies at the GWU were supported by the German Academic Exchange Service (DAAD). She followed up on her studies at the Heidelberg University from where she obtained her habilitation in 2012.

== Professional career ==
Between 2002 and 2012, she was a lecturer in international law at the University of Heidelberg. Between 2008 and 2010, Seibert-Fohr and her research group contributed to a project to promote the judicial independence in Eastern Europe, Central Asia and the Caucasus in cooperation with the Organization for Security and Co-Operation in Europe (OSCE). Between 2010 and 2011 she was a member of the Scientific Founding Committee of the International Academy of the Nuremberg Principles. In 2012, she was elected into the United Nations Human Rights Committee, in which she served as a member between 2013 and 2018 and as its vice-president from 2015 to 2017. Seibert-Fohr was the holder of the chair for Public Law, International Law and Human Rights at the University of Göttingen from 2013 until 2016, when she was assigned Professor at the University of Heidelberg.

Since 2016, she was the professor at the University of Heidelberg, where she lectured on human rights. She contributed to numerous research studies on human rights and international law.

=== Judge at the ECHR ===
Seibert-Fohr was elected as a judge at the ECHR by the Parliamentary assembly of the Council of Europe (PACE) in June 2019 and on the 1 January 2020, she assumed her post. For the term of her post as judge at the ECHR, she was given leave from her post as a professor at the University of Heidelberg. She views Europe as larger than only the European Union and emphasizes that the Council of Europe of whose assembly she was elected, has 46 member states. She also sees the eastern expansion of the European Union as an important step for Europe as a whole and for Germany in specific. After her election she settled in to Strasbourg, the seat of the ECHR.

== Other activities ==
- Max Planck Institute for the Study of Crime, Security and Law, Member of the Board of Trustees
