= Takis Tridimas =

Greek legal scholar

Takis Tridimas (complete name Panagiotis Takis Tridimas, in Greek Παναγιωτης Τακης Τριδημας) is a professor of European Law in King's College London and a former professor in Queen Mary University of London. He is a member of the bar in Middle Temple. He has served as référendaire to Sir Francis Jacobs in the European Court of Justice.
