= Margot Horspool =

British jurist

Margaretha Dana Petronella "Margot" Horspool (born 1938) is a Dutch-British academic specialising in the law of the European Union. She is Emeritus Professor of European and Comparative Law at the University of Surrey and Professorial Fellow at the British Institute of International and Comparative Law. She has been a professor at the University of Notre Dame, London programme.

== Biography ==
Born a Dutch citizen, she trained as an interpreter and became an interpreter for the European Coal and Steel Community. She was one of the interpreters for the Van Gend en Loos case, a landmark case of the European Court of Justice. In 1964 she married Christopher Horspool, a British lawyer whom she had met while he was on a legal scholarship in Luxembourg. They had two sons, including David Horspool.

Her career took a new turn when she took a law degree at King's College London. She was appointed to a lectureship (later Senior Lectureship) at University College London. She became Director of European Legal Studies at University College succeeding Eleanor Sharpston, and worked closely with Basil Markesinis and David O'Keeffe. She co-authored European Union Law, published by Oxford University Press, that reached its eleventh edition in 2021. She wrote the first edition of this book alone in 1997 and has had several co-authors for its subsequent revised editions. She was appointed Professor of European and Comparative Law at the University of Surrey, and following her retirement was granted the title of Emeritus Professor and also became a Professorial Fellow at the British Institute of International and Comparative Law in London.

== Selected publications ==
- Horspool, Margot; Humphreys, Matthew; Wells-Greco, Michael (2021). European Union Law (11th ed.). Oxford University Press. ISBN 978-0198870586.

(originally published: as Horspool, Margot (1998). European Union law. London: Butterworths. ISBN 9780406893017.)
