= Jean Mischo =

Jean Mischo (born 1938, Luxembourg City, died 10 May 2016), was an Advocate General of the European Court of Justice.

Jean Mischo studied law and political sciences at the universities of Montpellier, Paris and Cambridge. He was a member of the Commission Legal Service, Principal Administrator in the private offices of two Members of the Commission, occupied various high-ranking posts in the Ministry of Foreign Affairs of the Grand Duchy and was Deputy Permanent Representative of the Grand Duchy of Luxembourg to the European Communities. After having been Advocate General at the Court of Justice from January 1986 to October 1991, where he distinguished himself in the Factortame case, Mischo returned to the Ministry of Foreign Affairs of the Grand Duchy of Luxembourg where he carried out the duties of Ambassador/Secretary General from 1 January 1993.

By decision of 29 May 1997 Jean Mischo was appointed Advocate General to the European Court of Justice for the period from 7 October 1997 to 6 October 2003..

== See also ==
- List of members of the European Court of Justice

== Sources ==
"Fact Sheet (Text n°9181), Short biography of Jean Mischo". ENA (European Navigator): Centre Virtuel de la Connaissance sur l'Europe (CVCE), Luxembourg.
