= Gilberto Felici =

European Court of Human Rights judge

Gilberto Felici is currently judge at the European Court of Human Rights with respect to San Marino since September 2018. He is born the 15 June 1972 in San Marino.

== Education ==
In 1991, he graduated as commercial accountant at the “Istituto Tecnico Molari” – Santarcangelo di Romagna (Italy).

In 1996, he obtained a bachelor's degree in law at the University of Urbino (Italy).

In 1998, he achieved eligibility for teaching in schools (University of San Marino, biennial).

== Career ==
From 1993 from 1995, he participated in the activities of Amnesty International.

In 1998 he became lawyer and notary. He was also lecturer assistant at the Institute of History and Philosophy of Law at the University of Law until 2001. From 1999 to 2003 he was Judicial auditor (uditore giudiziario) in civil, criminal, and procedural law at the Tribunal of Sam Marino. He then became First instance single Judge from 2003 to 2018.

From 2003 to 2018, he was also member of the European Commission against Racism and Intolerance (ECRI) at the Council of Europe.

In 2008 he was lecturer on Human Rights and International Law at the Sant’Anna-Istituto universitario high school in Pisa, and in 2010 he became a member of the Scientific Committee of Istituto Giuridico Sammarinese and lecturer for the University of San Marino.He then became deputy director of the School of Specialisation in Sammarinese Law organized by Istituto Giuridico Sammarinese and the University of Urbino in 2014.

He was elected judge at the European Court of Human Rights the 26th September 2018.
