= Latif Huseynov =

- Lətif Hüseynov

Judge of the European Court of Human Rights in respect of Azerbaijan
- Incumbent
- Assumed office 2017

President of the European Committee for the Prevention of Torture and Inhuman or Degrading Treatment or Punishment
- In office March 2011 – 2015
- Preceded by: Mauro Palma
- Succeeded by: Mykola Gnatovskyy

Personal details
- Born: 1 February 1964 (age 62) Aghdam, Azerbaijan
- Education: Shevchenko University

Latif Huseynov (Azerbaijani: Lətif Hüseynov; 1 February 1964) is an Azerbaijan judge, and currently the judge of the European Court of Human Rights in respect of Azerbaijan.

== Biography ==
Latif Huseynov was born in 1964 in Aghdam. In June 1986, he graduated from Kyiv State University, Faculty of International Law. On 14 October 1994 he defended his thesis for the degree of Candidate of Legal Sciences in Kyiv, and on 29 September 2000 - Doctor of Law.

In 2001, he was chairman of the Legal Policies and State Structuring Department of the Milli Majlis of the Republic of Azerbaijan. Huseynov has been a member of the Venice Committee of the Council of Europe since 2003. He was a member of the European Committee for the Prevention of Torture and Inhuman or Degrading Treatment or Punishment between 2004 and 2015, and President of the Committee from 2011 to 2015. Huseynov praised prison conditions in Azerbaijan, stating in 2011 that "the [prisons'] situation in Azerbaijan is better than that in an overwhelming majority of European countries". In 2018, a CPT investigation found torture and ill-treatment "widespread and systemic" in Azerbaijan.

In 2005, he was appointed ad hoc judge at the European Court of Human Rights. Since 2017, Latif Huseynov has been in the European Court of Human Rights as a fully-fledged judge.

He is fluent in English, French, Russian, German and Ukrainian.

== Pedagogical activity ==
Latif Huseynov served as a lecturer within Baku State University Law School in 1990–1996. In 1992-1995, he worked as a deputy dean at the same law school. In July 2002, he taught Public International Law (part-time) at the Faculty of International Relations and International Law at Baku State University. He has been giving lectures on fundamental rights at ADA University since 2019.

== Recent publications ==
- The Concept of “Humanitarian Intervention” in the Light of Positive International Law //Beynalxalq huquq ve Inteqrasiya Problemleri. Baku, 2005, No. 1, pp. 3–10 (in Russian).
- Methods of Implementation of International Supervision in the Field of Human Rights Protection //Theory and Practice of Contemporary International Law (Essays in honour of Prof. Levan Alexidze on the 80th birthday anniversary), Tbilisi, 2007, pp. 160–199 (in Russian).
