= Simone Rozès =

French judge (born 1920)

Simone Rozès (née Ludwig; born 29 March 1920) is a French judge. She was awarded the Grand Cross of the Legion of Honour.

From 1973 to 1979, she was the first director of Supervised Education. From 1976 to 1981, she was president of the Paris High Court. From 1984 to 1988, she was the first president of the Court of Cassation.

== Life ==
She was born Simone Ludwig in 1920. She married Gabriel Rozès (1920–2001).

She graduated in law in 1945, before obtaining a higher studies diploma (DES) in public law and political economy and a diploma from Sciences Po.

Between 1946 and 1949, she practiced as a lawyer in Paris. Then she was one of the first women to take the competitive examination for the magistrate. She was first assigned to the Bourges Court of Appeal as a substitute judge in 1949. From 1958 to 1962, she was head of the office of the Keeper of the Seals, at the Ministry of Justice.

From 1976 to 1981, she was president of the Paris high court. In 1981, she was elected as advocate general at the Court of Justice of the European Communities, now the Court of Justice of the European Union.

On 10 June 1981, she was appointed a member of the balance sheet commission. This commission, created by Prime Minister Pierre Mauroy, has had the mission of drawing up a picture of the French economy. However, on 27 July 1981, she resigned from this body, following the declarations of Minister of the Interior Gaston Defferre.

She was appointed the first president of the Court of Cassation on 1 February 1984. She retired on 30 June 1988. She has since been its first honorary president.

== Works ==
- Rozès, Simone; Lombard, Paul (1992). Le juge et l'avocat (in French). Paris: R. Laffont. ISBN 978-2-221-06988-2.
- Delon, Francis; Berche, Xavier (2012). Dictionnaire biographique des premiers présidents et procureurs généraux de la Cour d'appel de Paris, des présidents et des procureurs du Tribunal de première instance puis de grande instance de la Seine, puis de Paris, 1800-2011 (in French). Paris: Département de Paris, [Archives de Paris]. ISBN 978-2-86075-015-8.
