= Maciej Szpunar =

Polish lawyer (born 1971)

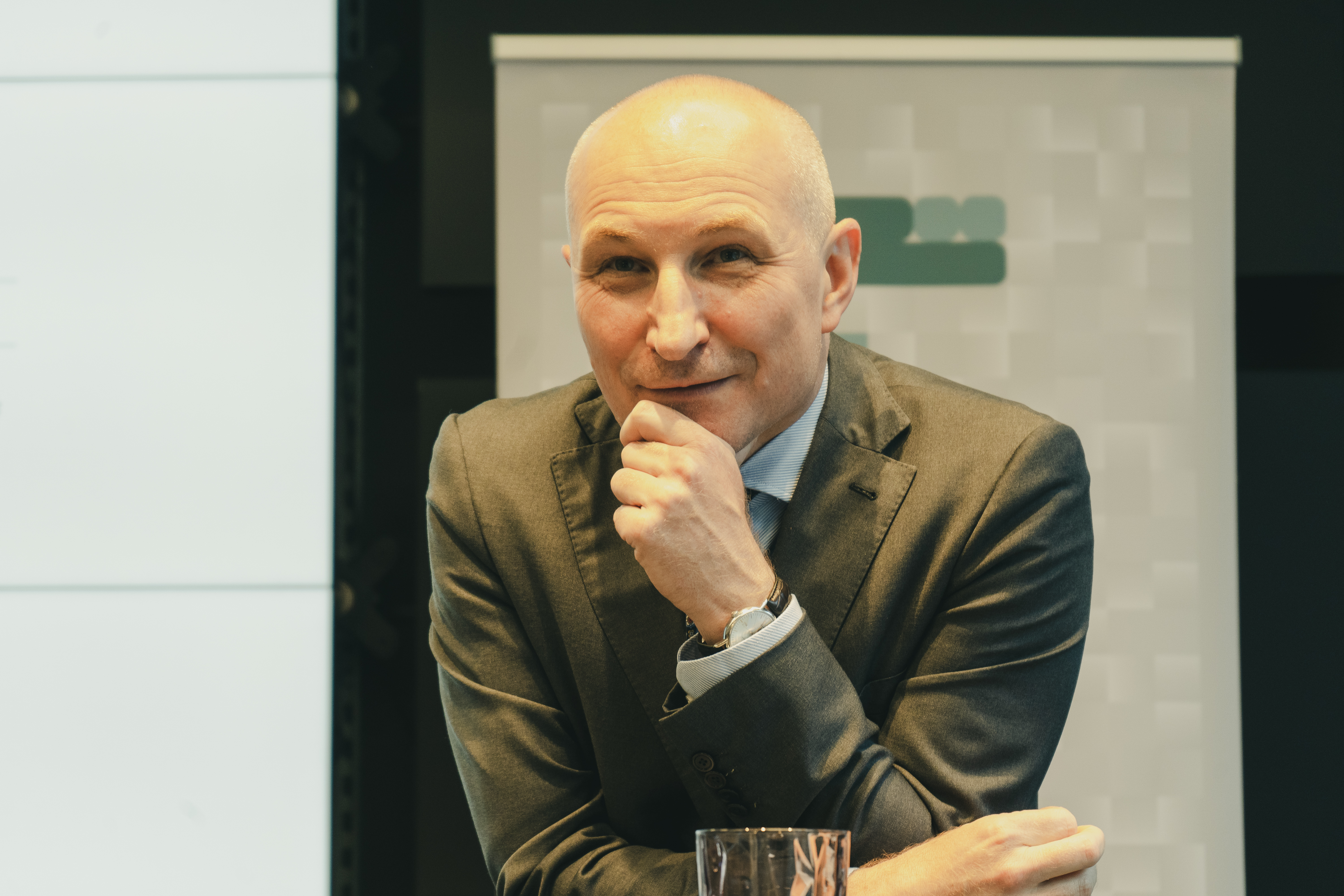
- Szpunar in 2022 in Brussels

First Advocate General of the European Court of Justice
- Incumbent
- Assumed office 11 October 2018
- Preceded by: Melchior Wathelet

Advocate General at the European Court of Justice
- Incumbent
- Assumed office 23 October 2013

Personal details
- Born: 24 May 1971 (age 55) Kraków, Poland
- Education: University of Silesia; College of Europe
- Profession: Lawyer

Panel discussion with Maciej Szpunar at Wikimania 2024 in Katowice, Poland

Maciej Aleksander Szpunar (born 24 May 1971) is a Polish lawyer, attorney at law and professor of legal sciences at the University of Silesia. Since 2013 he has served as an advocate general at the European Court of Justice and since 2018 as the first advocate general of the court. Previously Szpunar was undersecretary of state at the Office of the Committee for European Integration between 2008 and 2009 and undersecretary of state at the Ministry of Foreign Affairs between 2010 and 2013.

Szpunar studied law at the University of Silesia and at the College of Europe in Bruges, Belgium. He has worked as a legal scholar also at the Jesus College in Cambridge, University of Liège and European University Institute in Florence. Between 2001 and 2008 he practised law at the Katowice Bar.

In 2013, he was awarded the Officer's Cross of the Order of Polonia Restituta.

== See also ==
- List of members of the European Court of Justice
