= Erik O. Wennerström =

Swedish judge at the European Court of Human Rights

Judge of the European Court of Human Rights
- Incumbent
- Assumed office 1 April 2019

Personal details
- Born: August 25, 1962 (age 64) Västanfors, Sweden
- Education: Uppsala University (LL.M., LL.D.)

Erik O. Wennerström (born 25 August 1962) is a Swedish jurist, legal scholar and civil servant who has served as a judge of the European Court of Human Rights (ECHR) in respect of Sweden since 1 April 2019. Since 29 December 2024 he has been a Vice-President of the Court’s First Section.

== Biography ==
=== Early life and education ===
Wennerström was born in Västanfors, Sweden. He received a Master of Laws (LL.M.) from Uppsala University in 1988, and earned a Doctor of Laws (LL.D.) in 2007 with a dissertation on the rule of law and the European Union.

=== Career ===
From 1987 to 1990 Wennerström lectured in public law at Uppsala University. He then joined Swedish government service in 1990, including diplomatic training at the Ministry for Foreign Affairs, followed by postings to Sweden’s Permanent Mission in Geneva (1991–1994) and the Embassy in Kuala Lumpur (1994–1996). From 1996 to 2000 he worked at the European Commission on judicial cooperation in criminal matters. He later served at the Ministry of Justice as Director for International Relations and EU Affairs (2000–2004) and as Director and Head of International Law Enforcement Affairs (2005–2007). Between 2007 and 2012 he was Principal Legal Adviser on international law at the Ministry for Foreign Affairs.

Wennerström was Director-General of the Swedish National Council for Crime Prevention (Brottsförebyggande rådet, Brå) from 2012 until taking up his judgeship in 2019.

=== European Court of Human Rights ===
On 22 January 2019 the Parliamentary Assembly of the Council of Europe (PACE) elected Wennerström as the judge to the ECHR in respect of Sweden. He took office on 1 April 2019, and on 29 December 2024 became a Vice-President of Section.

=== Honours ===
Wennerström received the von Matern premium from Uppsala University in 2018 for his scholarly contributions on Europe and the rule of law.

== See also ==
- European Court of Human Rights
- Judiciary of Sweden
