= Deckmyn v Vandersteen =

European court ruling on copyright

- European Court of Justice

Submitted 8 April 2013 Decided 3 December 2014
- Full case name: Johan Deckmyn and Vrijheidsfonds VZW vs Helena Vandersteen, Christiane Vandersteen, Liliana Vandersteen, Isabelle Vandersteen, Rita Dupont, Amoras II CVOH and WPG Uitgevers België
- Case: C‑201/13
- CelexID: 62013CC0201
- ECLI: ECLI:EU:C:2014:2132
- Case type: Reference for a preliminary ruling
- Chamber: Full chamber
- Language of proceedings: Dutch
- Nationality of parties: Belgium
- Procedural history: Reference of the court of appeal of Brussels (Belgium)

Court composition
- Judge-Rapporteur; A. Prechal
- President; V. Skouris
- Judges: K. Lenaerts; R. Silva de Lapuerta; M. Ilešič; L. Bay Larsen; A. Borg Barthet; M. Safjan; A. Rosas; G. Arestis; D. Šváby; C. Vajda; S. Rodin
- Advocate General; P. Cruz Villalón

Instruments cited
- Information Society Directive

Keywords
- definition of parody in the Information Society Directive (Directive 2001/29/EC)

Original cover of Spike and Suzy (left) and the version of Deckmyn (right)

Johan Deckmyn and Vrijheidsfonds VZW vs Helena Vandersteen, Christiane Vandersteen, Liliana Vandersteen, Isabelle Vandersteen, Rita Dupont, Amoras II CVOH and WPG Uitgevers België is a preliminary ruling by the European Court of Justice. The reference concerned what conditions must be met for a derivative work to be considered a parody. Parodies are allowed under the Information Society Directive, in those countries that have indicated to apply the parody exception. The European Court of Justice indicated that the definition of the copyright exceptions was consistent throughout the EU (and given "an autonomous meaning" within the directive) and that to qualify the work must "evoke an existing work, while being noticeably different from it, and secondly, to constitute an expression of humour or mockery". The humour or mockery does not need to be directed towards the work itself, but it can also be mockery of something/someone else. When considering a parody-case the court should strike a fair balance between the rights of the rights holders of the original work, as the maker of the parody.

The ruling was requested by the court of appeal (Dutch: hof van beroep) of Brussels (Belgium) in a case of Vlaams Belang politician Johan Deckmyn who had copied a cover of Spike and Suzy (Dutch: Suske en Wiske), in which he had positioned Daniël Termont, the mayor of Ghent. The rights holders of the comic had sued Deckmyn for copyright infringement. Because the interpretation of EU law was involved in the case, the Belgian court made the reference.

== History ==
On 9 January 2011, during the New Year's reception of the city of Ghent, the Flemish nationalist political party Vlaams Belang handed out 2000 calendars with a cover largely copied from the cover of the 1961 Spike and Suzy comic De Wilde Weldoener (the Wild Benefactor). In the derivative image, money was distributed by Daniël Termont, the mayor of Ghent, whose image replaced that of Lambic, the original character. The persons collecting the money had dark-coloured skin and were wearing scarfs. Vlaams Belang politician Deckmyn said he wanted to highlight that in Ghent tax payer's money was mainly channelled to non-Ghent people, reducing the quality of life in the city as a whole. He indicated that "a child could see it was a parody" of the original Spike and Suzy cover.

The publisher of Spike and Suzy, WPG Uitgevers, said there had been no contact regarding the cover with them, and that no permission had been given; they dissociated themselves from the text and said that in their opinion the cover was "beyond parody": Willy Vandersteen, the author of the comic, had written in his will that his comics could never be used for political purposes.

== Belgian court cases ==
The civil division of the tribunal of first instance of Brussels ruled on 17 February in a preliminary injunction on the action that VanderSteen c.s. (the five heirs of Willy VanderSteen and the publishers) had started against Deckmyn and Vrijheidsfonds. The court held that the calendars infringed the Spike and Suzy copyright and that the parody exception did not apply. The vzw Vrijheidsfonds (the association collecting gifts for Vlaams Belang) and Deckmyn were not to distribute the calendars. Both defendants (Deckmyn, case 2011/AR/914 and Vrijheidsfonds, case 2011/AR/915) appealed the verdict to the court of appeal in Brussels. In its preliminary decision the 8th Chamber of the Court merged both cases, and ruled that the calendar depicted a discriminating message. It considered that the parody exception existed in Belgian law (copyright law of 1994, Article 22.1.6) and that the Infosoc directive allowed such a parody exception (Article 2.5.3.k) and had not explicitly left the definition of parody to national law. The concept of parody had furthermore not been explained by the European Court of Justice, and the court therefore decided to ask three questions of the European court:

1. Is the concept of "parody" an independent concept in European Union law?
2. If so, which of four suggested characteristics of parody have to be met to determine if a work is a parody?
3. Are there additional requirements?

The court stayed proceedings while awaiting the answer of the EU court.

== Court of Justice of the European Union ==
Besides the parties in the conflict, the European Commission and the Kingdom of Belgium also opined, either in writing or during the hearing on 7 January 2014. The Advocate General gave his opinion on 22 May 2014, while the court had not ruled as of July 2014.

=== Opinion of the Advocate General ===
The opinion of Advocate General of the European Court of Justice Pedro Cruz Villalón was delivered on 22 May 2014. He agreed with the court of appeal: regarding the first question, the term "parody" is an independent concept, as its definition was not explicitly left to the national law, although there may be a "wide margin of interpretation" left to individual countries. The Advocate General discussed the last two question together and argued that while exceptions to a general rule in EU law should generally be interpreted narrowly, in the exceptions under 2.5.3 a wide margin of interpretation was given to the individual member states and they should give in such a case due regard to evaluation of the fundamental rights of the European Union. He suggested that for a work to be considered a parody, it should evoke an existing work while being noticeably different from it and, secondly, constitute an expression of humour and mockery.

=== Court Ruling ===
The court's decision was published on 3 September 2014. The court largely followed the position of the Advocate-General: regarding the first question, the term "parody" is an independent concept, as its definition was not explicitly left to the national law. Its definition should thus be the same in all member states applying the directive. The court indicated that in order for a work to constitute a parody it is required to "evoke an existing work, while being noticeably different from it, and secondly, to constitute an expression of humour or mockery". The parody itself does not need to meet originality requirements for a work, although it must be noticeably different from the work it is based on. Lastly the court specified that courts should strike a fair balance between the rights holders of the original work, and the maker of the parody.

== Chronology of events ==
In the table below the events and the involved parties are placed in chronological order.

Date	Event	Other parties/effect
1961	Willy Vandersteen writes Spike and Suzy comic "De Wilde Weldoener"	
28 August 1990	Willy Vandersteen dies	his heirs obtain copyrights
9 January 2011	Vlaams Belang politician Deckmyn hands out a calendar containing a reworked cover of "De Wilde Weldoener"	the cover depicts Ghent mayor Daniël Termont
17 February 2011	The tribunal of first instance rules the calendars constitute copyright infringement	the case was started by Vandersteen et al. against Deckmyn and Vlaams Belang associated organisation Vrijheidsfonds VZW
15 April 2011	Deckmyn and Vrijheidsfonds appeal the decision to the Brussels court of appeal	
8 April 2013	The court of appeal asks the European Court of Justice (ECJ) for a preliminary ruling regarding the "parody exception"	When in doubt about the interpretation of EU law, the court is allowed to ask for such a ruling.
7 January 2014	The ECJ holds an oral hearing	The parties are heard; input is received also from the European Commission and Belgium (orally or in written form)
22 May 2014	ECJ Advocate-General gives his opinion on the case	The opinion serves as advice to the ECJ
3 September 2014	ECJ answers the questions referred for a preliminary ruling	The answers are binding on the requesting court, and constitute a "factual precedent" for other EU courts.
	Case is retracted or the court of appeal of Brussels rules	The verdict may be appealed only regarding points of law in cassation

== See also ==
- List of European Court of Justice rulings
- Campbell v. Acuff-Rose Music, Inc., 1995 U.S. Supreme Court decision on whether parody can be considered fair use
