= Chavez-Vilchez (C-133/15) =

2017 European Court of Justice decision

- European Court of Justice

Submitted 18 March 2015 Decided 10 May 2017
- Full case name: H.C. Chavez-Vilchez and Others v Raad van bestuur van de Sociale verzekeringsbank and Others.
- Case: C-133/15
- CelexID: 62015CJ0133
- ECLI: ECLI:EU:C:2017:354
- Case type: Reference for a preliminary ruling
- Chamber: Full chamber
- Nationality of parties: The Netherlands
- Procedural history: Centrale Raad van Beroep ECLI:NL:CRVB:2015:665

Court composition
- Judge-Rapporteur; Allan Rosas
- President; Koen Lenaerts
- Judges: A. Tizzano; R. Silva de Lapuerta; M. Ilešič; J.L. da Cruz Vilaça; E. Juhász; M. Berger; A. Prechal; E. Regan; C. Toader; M. Safjan; D. Šváby; E. Jarašiūnas; C.G. Fernlund
- Advocate General; Maciej Szpunar

Legislation affecting
- Interprets article 20 TFEU

H.C. Chavez-Vilchez and Others v Raad van bestuur van de Sociale verzekeringsbank and Others (2017) C-133/15 (known as the Chavez-Vilchez ruling) was a decision of the European Court of Justice (ECJ) upon a request for a preliminary ruling, referred to the ECJ by the (Dutch) Centrale Raad van Beroep. The questions submitted concerned the conditions under which a parent who is not a national of a Member State of the European Union can derive a right of residence from the fact that his/her child is a national of a Member State.

== Facts ==
The judgment discusses eight disputes in the main proceedings. One of them concerns Mrs. Chavez-Vilchez. She is a Venezuelan national who came to the Netherlands in 2007/2008 on a tourist visa. Her relationship with a Netherlands national led, on 30 March 2009, to the birth of a child who has Netherlands nationality. Ms Chavez-Vilchez had legal custody of her child. She was responsible for the care of her child and had stated that the father did not contribute to the child's support or upbringing.

The other seven cases were similar.

The Centrale Raad van Beroep had to decide whether these mothers/third-country nationals had the right of residence in the Netherlands.

== Questions referred ==
The Centrale Raad van Beroep referred to the Court the following questions for a preliminary ruling:

1. Must Article 20 TFEU be interpreted as precluding a Member State from depriving a third-country national who is responsible for the day-to-day and primary care of his/her minor child, who is a national of that Member State, of the right of residence in that Member State?
2. In answering that question, is it relevant that it is that parent on whom the child is entirely dependent, legally, financial and/or emotionally and, furthermore, that it cannot be excluded that the other parent, who is a national of the Member State, might in fact be able to care for the child?
3. In that case, should the parent/third-country national have to make a plausible case that the other parent is not able to assume responsibility for the care of the child, so that the child would be obliged to leave the territory of the European Union if the parent/third-country national is denied a right of residence?

== Judgment ==
In answer to the first two questions referred — examined together — the Court ruled:

- Article 20 TFEU must be interpreted as meaning that for the purposes of assessing whether a child who is a citizen of the European Union would be compelled to leave the territory of the European Union as a whole and thereby deprived of the genuine enjoyment of the substance of the rights conferred on him by that article if the child’s third-country national parent were refused a right of residence in the Member State concerned, the fact that the other parent, who is a Union citizen, is actually able and willing to assume sole responsibility for the primary day-to-day care of the child is a relevant factor, but it is not in itself a sufficient ground for a conclusion that there is not, between the third-country national parent and the child, such a relationship of dependency that the child would indeed be so compelled were there to be such a refusal of a right of residence.
- Such an assessment must take into account, in the best interests of the child concerned, all the specific circumstances, including the age of the child, the child’s physical and emotional development, the extent of his emotional ties both to the Union citizen parent and to the third-country national parent, and the risks which separation from the latter might entail for the child’s equilibrium.

In answer to the third question referred, the Court ruled:

- Article 20 TFEU must be interpreted as not precluding a Member State from providing that the right of residence in its territory of a third-country national, who is a parent of a minor child that is a national of that Member State and who is responsible for the primary day-to-day care of that child, is subject to the requirement that the third-country national must provide evidence to prove that a refusal of a right of residence to the third-country national parent would deprive the child of the genuine enjoyment of the substance of the rights pertaining to the child’s status as a Union citizen, by obliging the child to leave the territory of the European Union, as a whole.
- It is however for the competent authorities of the Member State concerned to undertake, on the basis of the evidence provided by the third-country national, the necessary enquiries in order to be able to assess, in the light of all the specific circumstances, whether a refusal would have such consequences.

== Significance ==
Can a third-country national who is the custodial parent of a minor child who is a Union citizen stay with his child if the child would otherwise have to leave the European Union?

After the Ruiz Zambrano judgment this was not automatically the case in the Netherlands. The Ruiz Zambrano judgment was interpreted restrictively. In many cases one of the parents was a Union citizen, and then that parent was supposed to take care of the child, even if they (that is, the Union citizen) were not able or willing to do so. The 'third-country national' (the parent who was not a citizen of the Union) could then still be denied the right of residence.

The Chavez-Vilchez judgment specified more explicitly the conditions under which a third-country national can derive a right of residence from Article 20 TFEU when he/she has the day-to-day care of a Union citizen. The interests of the child were paramount: when assessing the right of residence of the third-country national, all circumstances of the case must be taken into account, including the relationship of dependency on the child. (Note: In a ruling of 5 May 2022, the Court ruled that the relationship of dependency is already presumed when the third-country national lives together permanently with the other parent, who is a Union citizen, and they have joint custody of the child.) More specifically, it cannot be assumed without justification that the child/Union citizen can be cared for by the 'other parent' lawfully residing in the European Union.

== Other cases ==
The Chavez-Vilchez judgment has led to further preliminary questions from the Netherlands:

- On 15 September 2020, the District Court of The Hague asked preliminary questions in a case in which the dependent child/Union citizen was born in Thailand, has always lived in Thailand and has never been to the European Union. On 22 June 2023, the Court ruled —in essence— that the Chavez-Vilchez criteria are applicable even when the child has resided outside the territory of the EU since birth, provided that he or she is dependent on the parent/third-country national and will enter and reside in the Member State concerned together with that parent.
- On 24 November 2020, the District Court of The Hague —amongst other things— asked the preliminary question whether the Chavez-Vilchez right of residence is temporary (Note: In the Netherlands only a non-temporary right of residence can be promoted —after some time— to a permanent right of residence.) by its nature. On 7 September 2022, the Court answered that question in the negative. The Court recalled that the relationship of dependency on which the derived right of residence of a third-country national under Article 20 TFEU is based, will in principle not be of short duration, but may extend over a considerable period.

== See also ==
- Judgment of the Court (Grand Chamber) of 8 March 2011. Gerardo Ruiz Zambrano v Office national de l’emploi (ONEm), Case C-34/09, ECLI:EU:C:2011:124
- Judgment of the Court (Full Court) of 19 October 2004. Kunqian Catherine Zhu and Man Lavette Chen v Secretary of State for the Home Department, Case C-200/02, ECLI:EU:C:2004:639
