= Bodil Lindqvist v Åklagarkammaren i Jönköping =

- European Court of Justice

Submitted 1 March 2001 Decided 6 November 2003
- Full case name: Bodil Lindqvist v Åklagarkammaren i Jönköping
- Case: Case C-101/01
- CelexID: 62001CJ0101
- ECLI: ECLI:EU:C:2003:596
- Case type: Reference for a preliminary ruling
- Chamber: Full chamber
- Nationality of parties: Swedish
- Procedural history: Reference of the Göta hovrätt (Sweden)

Ruling
- Referring to various persons on an internet page and identifying them either by name or by other means constitutes processing of personal data by automatic means within the meaning of Community law.

Court composition
- Judge-Rapporteur; D.A.O. Edward
- President; P. Jann
- Judges: C.W.A. Timmermans; C. Gulmann; J.N. Cunha Rodrigues; A. Rosas; J.-P. Puissochet; F. Macken; S. von Bahr
- Advocate General; A. Tizzano

Legislation affecting
- Interprets Directive 95/46/EC

Keywords
- Directive 95/46/EC - Scope - Publication of personal data on the internet - Place of publication - Definition of transfer of personal data to third countries - Freedom of expression - Compatibility with Directive 95/46 of greater protection for personal data under the national legislation of a Member State

Bodil Lindqvist v Åklagarkammaren i Jönköping (2003) is a decision by the Court of Justice of the European Communities (European Court of Justice). It held that referring to various persons on an internet page and identifying them either by name or by other means constitutes processing of personal data by automatic means within the meaning of Community law.

It was the first time the Court ruled on the scope of Directive 95/46/EC (Data Protection Directive) and freedom of movement for such data on the internet. It was cited in Costeja (2014), a controversial ruling that held an internet search engine operator established in the European Union (EU) is responsible for the processing that it carries out of personal information that appears on web pages published by third parties, confirming a right of erasure widely regarded as a so-called right to be forgotten.

== See also ==
- Google Spain SL, Google Inc. v Agencia Española de Protección de Datos, Mario Costeja González (Costeja)

== Bibliography ==
Kuner, Cristopher (2013). Transborder Data Flows and Data Privacy Law. OUP. ISBN 0199674612.
