= Kadi v Council and Commission =

2008 European Court of Justice decision

Kadi and Al Barakaat International Foundation v Council and Commission
- European Court of Justice

Decided 3 September 2008
- Full case name: Yassin Abdullah Kadi and Al Barakaat International Foundation v Council of the European Union and Commission of the European Communities.
- Case: C-402/05
- ECLI: EU:C:2008:461
- Language of proceedings: English and Swedish

Court composition
- President; V. Skouris
- Judge Rapporteur; C.W.A. Timmermans
- Judges: A. Rosas; K. Lenaerts; J.N. Cunha Rodrigues; R. Silva de Lapuerta; K. Schiemann; J. Makarczyk; P. Kūris; P. Lindh; J.-C. Bonichot; T. von Danwitz; A. Arabadjiev
- Advocate General; M. Poiares Maduro

Keywords
- Conflict of laws

Kadi and Al Barakaat International Foundation v Council and Commission (2008) C-402/05 is a case concerning the hierarchy between international law and the general principles of EU law. It is also known as Kadi I to distinguish from a later related case, Kadi II (2013).

== Facts ==
UN Security Council Resolution 1267 (1999) froze the funds of those suspected of associating with Osama bin Laden. In keeping with the Common Foreign and Security Policy and upholding the member-states individual commitments to follow UNSC resolutions, the European Union gave effect to this resolution through multiple regulations.

Mr Kadi, a Saudi resident with assets in Sweden, and Al Barakaat, a charity for Somali refugees, claimed that the freezing of their assets was unlawful. The seizures occurred without any court hearing, right of redress or allegation of wrongdoing. Kadi argued within the Court of First Instance that the EC lacked competence to sanction individuals and had breached his fundamental rights to a fair hearing, respect for property, and effective judicial review.

The claimants were named in the resolution and the regulation. They claimed that the regulation should be annulled under TFEU Article 263 and was a breach of human rights.

== Judgment ==
=== Court of First Instance ===
The Court of First Instance held that the Regulation was valid. The court found that the power to sanction individuals was supplied by article 308 EC (352 TFEU) which allows the Council, "acting unanimously on a proposal from the Commission," to grant the Community the powers "necessary to attain... one of the objectives of the community". As far as fundamental rights were concerned, the Court found that a state, and also the EC, could not review a UNSC resolution within its own legal order.

The court determined that a Security Council resolution was binding on all UN members (UN Charter Article 25) and prevailed over all treaties (Article 103). Therefore, they must be carried out even if in conflict with EU treaties. Member states were parties to the UN Charter before the EU treaties and so TFEU Article 351(1) required fulfilment of the Charter obligations. That meant the resolution prevailed over EU law. The EU was not bound under international law, but it was bound in EU law, following from International Fruit Company (1972) Case 21-4/72, [1972] ECHR 1219. There was also no infringement of a jus cogens norm by the resolution.

The case was appealed to the ECJ. In his appeal, Kadi cited the ECtHR case Bosphorus Airlines v Ireland as a case where a Community regulation, adopted to give effect to a UNSC resolution, was reviewed in light of fundamental rights.

=== Advocate General Opinion ===
The relationship between international law and the Community legal order is governed by the Community legal order itself, and international law can permeate that legal order only under the conditions set by the constitutional principles of the Community.

— Advocate General Luís Miguel Poiares Pessoa Maduro

Before the ECJ issued its judgment, Advocate General Maduro issued an opinion on the case. He argued that the use of article 308 EC (352 TFEU) was unnecessary, as article 310 EC (217 TFEU) (allowing sanctions on third countries) also allowed sanctions on individuals from third countries, insofar as those sanctions affect the economic relationship between the EC and the third country. Maduro also argued that the EC should, in granting effect to the UNSC regulation, ensure that fundamental rights are followed within the EC legal order.

[T]he Court cannot, in deference to the views of those institutions, turn its back on the fundamental values that lie at the basis of the Community legal order and which it has the duty to protect.

— Advocate General Luís Miguel Poiares Pessoa Maduro

In the Opinion of Advocate General Maduro, EU law did not need to "unconditionally bow" to international law if a possible consequence was a violation of basic constitutional principles. In arguing this, he cited Van Gend en Loos, "in which the Court affirmed the autonomy of the Community legal order". He also stated that the top priority of the Court was "to preserve the constitutional framework created by the treaty," even when implementing binding international agreements.

=== Court of Justice ===
[T]he obligations imposed by an international agreement cannot have the effect of prejudicing the constitutional principles of the EC Treaty, which include the principle that all Community acts must respect fundamental rights, that respect constituting a condition of their lawfulness which it is for the Court to review in the framework of the complete system of legal remedies established by the Treaty.

— European Court of Justice

The ECJ's judgment held the original judgment of the Court of First Instance, that article 308 EC (352 TFEU) was necessary to grant competence to sanction individuals. Nonetheless, the Court of Justice determined that the regulation was invalid in EU law with regard to fundamental rights. The ECJ confirmed that its power to review the lawfulness of a regulation with regard to fundamental rights, whether or not that regulation was adopted to give effect to international law. The Court judged that both Kadi's rights to a fair hearing and respect for property had, in fact, been infringed. In order to follow the UN to the best of their ability, the Court gave the Commission a three month time frame to correct the infringements before the regulation would be annulled.

== Significance ==
In this case, the ECJ affirmed its right to review all Community acts with regard to fundamental rights, even if those acts are passed in conformity with an internationally-binding resolution. In this way, the ECJ gave itself the ability to "de facto review" the resolution itself. Additionally, by comparing the UN Charter to agreements under article 300(7) EC (218 TFEU), the court declined to place the UN Charter hierarchically above EC law.

These developments follow the court's jurisprudence of the autonomy of European law from national law, and by extension from intergovernmental agreements such as the UN.

A treaty can never enjoy primacy over provisions (including protection of fundamental human rights) that form part of the constitutional foundations of the union... Even if the UN Charter were binding on the EU, it would not take primacy over the constitutive treaties, or the constitutional foundations of the EU system.

— European Court of Justice

The CJEU judgment reflected a choice between absolute acceptance of international law and the preference for its own constitutional requirements on the assumption that international law may still be in a state of development: a view widely held in the aftermath of the war on terror and the 2003 invasion of Iraq. This contrasted to the US Supreme Court rule from Murray v The Schooner Charming Betsy, that an act of Congress ought never to be construed to violate the law of nations if other possible constructions are available or it was "fairly possible" to avoid conflicts.

== See also ==
- EU law
- United Kingdom constitutional law
