= Apostolides v Orams =

- European Court of Justice

Submitted 13 September 2007 Decided 28 April 2009
- Full case name: Meletios Apostolides v David Charles Orams and Linda Elizabeth Orams
- Case: C-420/07
- CelexID: 62007J0420
- Chamber: Grand Chamber
- Nationality of parties: Cyprus and United Kingdom
- Procedural history: Court of Appeal (England), Civil Division, judgment of 19 June 2007 (2153/2007; A2/2006/2114)

Ruling
- 1. The suspension of the application of the acquis communautaire in those areas of the Republic of Cyprus in which the Government of that Member State does not exercise effective control, provided for by Article 1(1) of Protocol No 10 on Cyprus to the Act concerning the conditions of accession [to the European Union] of the Czech Republic, the Republic of Estonia, the Republic of Cyprus, the Republic of Latvia, the Republic of Lithuania, the Republic of Hungary, the Republic of Malta, the Republic of Poland, the Republic of Slovenia and the Slovak Republic and the adjustments to the Treaties on which the European Union is founded, does not preclude the application of Council Regulation (EC) No 44/2001 of 22 December 2000 on jurisdiction and the recognition and enforcement of judgments in civil and commercial matters to a judgment which is given by a Cypriot court sitting in the area of the island effectively controlled by the Cypriot Government, but concerns land situated in areas not so controlled.; 2.Article 35(1) of Regulation No 44/2001 does not authorise the court of a Member State to refuse recognition or enforcement of a judgment given by the courts of another Member State concerning land situated in an area of the latter State over which its Government does not exercise effective control.: 3. The fact that a judgment given by the courts of a Member State, concerning land situated in an area of that State over which its Government does not exercise effective control, cannot, as a practical matter, be enforced where the land is situated does not constitute a ground for refusal of recognition or enforcement under Article 34(1) of Regulation No 44/2001 and it does not mean that such a judgment is unenforceable for the purposes of Article 38(1) of that regulation.; 4.The recognition or enforcement of a default judgment cannot be refused under Article 34(2) of Regulation No 44/2001 where the defendant was able to commence proceedings to challenge the default judgment and those proceedings enabled him to argue that he had not been served with the document which instituted the proceedings or with the equivalent document in sufficient time and in such a way as to enable him to arrange for his defence.

Court composition
- Judge-Rapporteur; Rosario Silva de Lapuerta
- President; Vassilios Skouris
- Judges: Peter Jann; Christiaan Timmermans; Allan Rosas; Koen Lenaerts; Marko Ilešič; Aindrias Ó Caoimh (barrister); Jiří Malenovský; Ján Klučka; Uno Lõhmus
- Advocate General; Juliane Kokott

Legislation affecting
- Interprets Regulation (EC) No 44/2001; Interprets Protocol No 10 on Cyprus of the 2003 Accession Treaty

Apostolides v Orams is a landmark legal case decided in the European Court of Justice on 28 April 2009. It concerned the right for Greek Cypriot refugees to reclaim land in northern Cyprus, displaced after the Turkish invasion of Cyprus in 1974. The case determined that although Cyprus does not exercise effective control in northern Cyprus, cases decided in its courts are applicable through European Union law.

== Background to the case ==
In 1974, Meletios Apostolides, an architect, was displaced with his family from his property in Lapithos as a result of the partition of Cyprus which followed a Greek Cypriot coup and the subsequent Turkish invasion of Cyprus.

In 2002, David Charles and Linda Elizabeth Orams, from Hove, Sussex, England, invested £160,000 of their retirement fund to acquire the land from a third party and to construct a villa on the premises. The third party claimed to have acquired the property from the Turkish Republic of Northern Cyprus (TRNC), a de facto state which, to this day, has not been recognised by any state except the Republic of Turkey. The Orams used the property in northern Cyprus for vacations and maintained a separate property in the UK.

In 2003, the de facto administration of northern Cyprus eased crossing restrictions along the ceasefire line giving the opportunity to displaced Cypriots to visit their old properties. Meletios Apostolides visited his property and confirmed the construction of the house occupied by the Orams.

== Legal proceeding in Cyprus ==
Meletios Apostolides took his case to the Nicosia District court, demanding that the Orams vacate his property. Northern Cyprus, although a de facto functioning entity, remains an unrecognised state internationally. Apostolides' case centred on the argument that although following the Turkish invasion the government of Cyprus had lost effective control over the northern part of the island, its laws still applied even if these were not easily enforceable.

In November 2004, the Nicosia District Court ordered the Orams to:

- demolish the villa, swimming pool and fencing which they had erected on what the court regarded as Mr Apostolides' land
- deliver immediately to Apostolides free possession of the land
- pay Mr Apostolides various sums by way of special damages and monthly rental charges (including interest) until the judgement was complied with
- refrain from continuing with the unlawful intervention on the land, whether personally or through their agents, and
- pay various sums in respect of the costs and expenses of the proceedings (with interest on those sums).

The Orams appealed this decision, which was heard at the supreme court of Cyprus. The appeal was dismissed.

== Legal proceeding in England and Wales ==
Due to the island's division, the judgement reached by the Cypriot court was not directly enforceable, hence Apostolides used EU regulations to have it registered and applied against the Orams' assets in the UK. The procedure for the enforcement of judgements between Member States of the European Union is provided by Regulation No 44/2001. The Orams were represented in the English courts by Cherie Blair, an action criticised by the then president of Cyprus Tassos Papadopoulos. He argued that due to its political nature, the wife of a Prime Minister should not be involved in such a case.

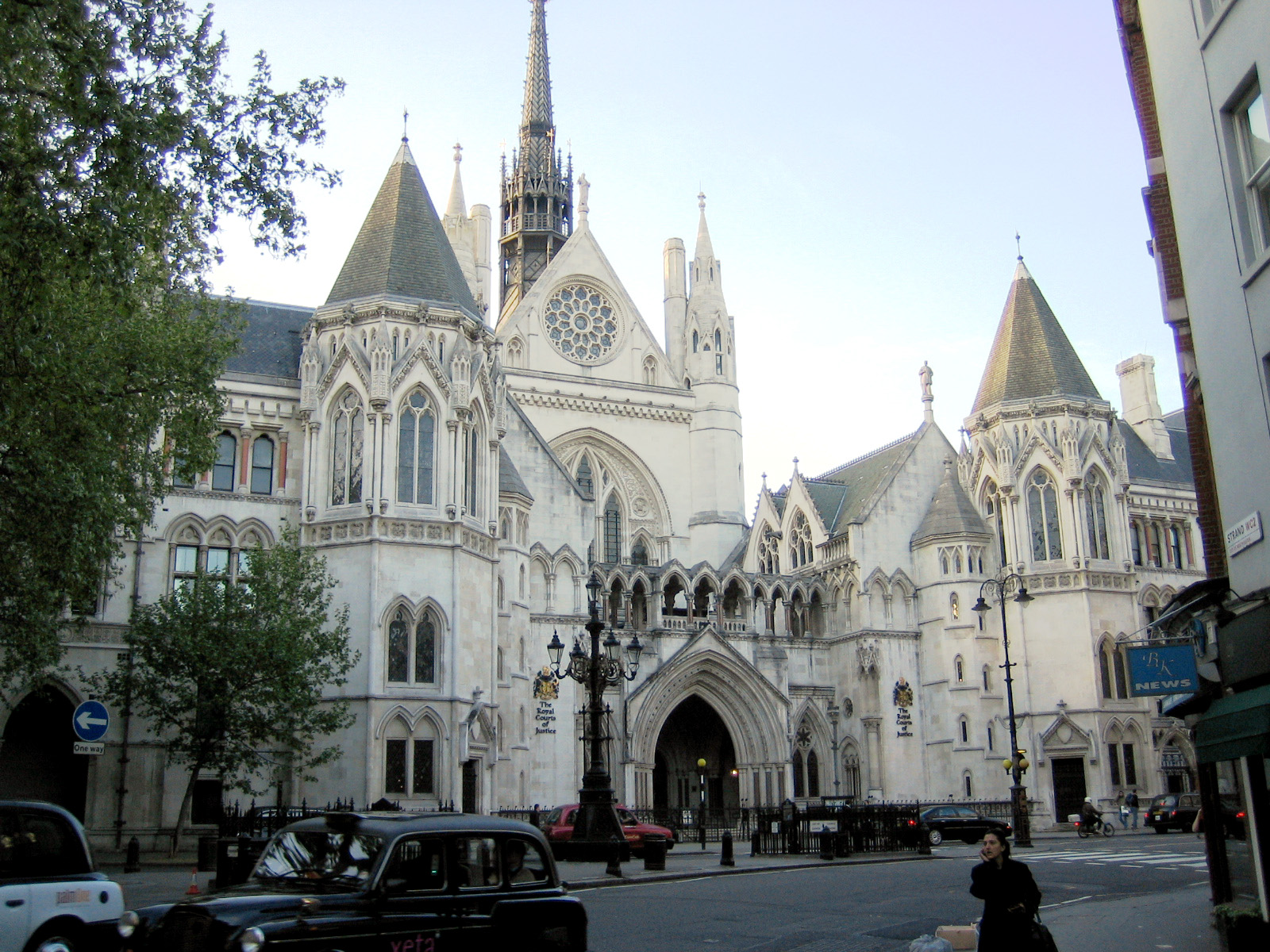
Royal Courts of Justice

In September 2006, the High Court of Justice ruled in favour of the Orams. Apostolides appealed the decision at the Court of Appeal which in turn referred the case to the European Court of Justice (ECJ), in Luxembourg.

The ECJ in turn ruled in favour of Apostolides (see next section below).

The case was then returned to the Court of Appeal in England which decided in favour of Meletios Apostolides on 19 January 2010. According to one of the judges of the Court of Appeal panel, under the current system, this decision is final and no further escalation is possible. However, the Orams tried to appeal to the Supreme Court of the United Kingdom.

On 26 March 2010, the U.K. Supreme Court refused permission for the Orams to take the case to appeal, effectively bringing it to a conclusion. The Cyprus Mail reported that the Orams' had abandoned the property rather than demolish it.

== Legal proceeding in the EU ==
The case C-420/07, Apostolides v Orams, was heard by the Grand Chamber of the European Court of Justice in Luxembourg. A panel of judges ruled on 28 April 2009 that British courts were able to enforce the judicial decisions made in Cyprus, which uphold the property rights of Cypriots forced out during the invasion.

== Implications ==
The case has been described as a landmark test case as it sets a precedent for other Cypriots (primarily Greek Cypriot refugees) to bring similar actions to court.

Both the British High Commission in Cyprus and the Foreign and Commonwealth Office have issued warnings regarding the purchase of property in northern Cyprus.

Following the final ruling by the Court of Appeal in England, Meletios Apostolides' lawyer Constantis Candounas stated that he was considering similar lawsuits against foreign tourists using hotels in the TRNC that were owned by Greek Cypriots previous to the partition of Cyprus.

== See also ==
- Northern Cyprus and the European Union
- Loizidou v. Turkey
- Human rights in Turkey
- Greek Cypriots, et al. v. TRNC and HSBC Bank USA
- Annan Plan
