= Grzegorz Dorobek case =

- European Court of Justice

Submitted 13 December 2011 Decided 2014 20 March
- Case: C-639/11
- CelexID: 31999L0007
- ECLI: ECLI:EU:C:2014:173
- Chamber: Fifth Chamber
- Nationality of parties: Polish

Court composition
- President; T. von Danwitz
- Judge Rapporteur; E. Juhász
- Judges: A. Rosas; D. Šváby; C. Vajda
- Advocate General; Niilo Jääskinen

Case C-639/11 is case judged by the European Court of Justice. It is often referred to as the Grzegorz Dorobek case after the first of 16 complainants whose grievances were accepted by the European Commission as grounds for the commission to bring the case against the Republic of Poland. It specifically deals with whether vehicles with a steering wheel on the right hand side (normal in countries where vehicles drive on the left hand side of the road) must be given a registration number by the authorities in Poland (a country where vehicles drive on the right hand side of the road). More generally it deals with the citizens' rights of free movement, which form the basis of the European Project. It also deals with the right of the European Commission to give instructions to member countries and the strength of grounds needed for member states to ignore the general rights and specific instructions.

== Events leading to the case ==
In January 2008, Grzegorz returned to Poland from the UK with a right hand drive Vauxhall Vectra. He submitted an application for registration of the vehicle to the district office in Końskich. The vehicle registry refused, citing the decree of the Minister of Infrastructure dated 31 December 2002 on the technical conditions of vehicles and of the scope of the necessary equipment.

== Court procedures in Poland ==
In March 2008 Grzegorz appealed to the Municipal Court of Appeal in Kielce basing his case on the law of the European Union. “Member States may not on grounds relating to the steering equipment:

- refuse, in respect of a type of vehicle, to grant EC type-approval or national type-approval, or
- prohibit the sale, registration, entry into service of vehicles”

As the Local Government Appeal Court upheld the decision, in February 2009 Grzegorz filed a case before the Regional Administrative Court against the decision of the Municipal Court of Appeals. In April 2009, the Regional Administrative Court in Kielce dismissed the case, judgment (file II SA / Ke 157/ 09) and upheld the decision of the Municipal Court of Appeals.

In July 2009, Grzegorz took his case to the Supreme Administrative Court in Warsaw but in January 2010, the court dismissed the complaint (file I OSK 1148–1109). And so the administrative proceedings in Poland ended.

== The case in the European Union ==
In October 2009, the European Commission sent a letter to the Government of the Republic of Poland regarding its breach of its obligations to comply with directives 70/311/EEC, 2007/46/EC and Article 28 of the Treaty establishing the European Community. The Polish government replied to the committee clarifying and reiterating its position on the registration of right hand drive vehicles.

In September 2010, the European Commission decided to send a reasoned opinion on the matter to the Polish authorities . The letter indicated that the commission would wait two months for a remedy of the deficiencies in Polish law after which it would refer the matter to the European Court of Justice in Luxembourg. A year later, the European Commission referred the case to the European Court of Justice in Luxembourg. "The Commission considers that if a motor vehicle meets EU type-approval, it can be safe to drive in all Member States, irrespective of the adjustment to the right or left-hand traffic. The Commission believes that the obstacles in registering a car with the steering wheel on the right side violate the provisions of Directive 70/311/EEC, the Framework Directive 2007/46/EC and Article 34 of the Treaty on the Functioning of the European Union." On 8 June 2012 the President of the Court of Justice of the European Union granted leave to intervene to the Republic of Lithuania. On 7 November 2013 the Court of Justice of the European Union issued an opinion on C-639/11.

The verdict delivered on 20 March 2014. The court decided that the Republic of Poland (also the Republic of Lithuania whose case was added) are breaking EU law by refusing to register right hand drive vehicles. The court refused to accept the Polish interpretation of the wording of European Union road vehicle regulations, also refused to accept the Polish argument that right hand drive vehicles would significantly affect road safety and found that the statistical analysis presented by the Polish Government did not meet the standards required for use in a court of law.

== After the Judgement of the European Court of Justice ==
After the judgement of the European Court of Justice, Mr. Dorobek took his case to the Polish Supreme Administration Court. The court refused to reverse the decision of the lower courts on the grounds that the verdict of the European Court of Justice is case law which was not available to the lower court when they decided against him. The court did however allow some costs and opened the way for Mr Dorobek to recommence the process from square one.

Initially the Polish Government gave indications to the Commission that they would comply with the court's judgement by the end of 2014.

Having not complied, in February 2015 the Polish Government informed the Commission that it would not simply allow right hand drive vehicles to be dealt with in the same way as left hand drive vehicles; additional checks would be added to the annual roadworthiness tests. This led to a three-month standstill to allow the Commission and other EU National Governments time to object if they wished to.

Once the period for challenges had passed the Polish Government published the new regulations on 2 July 2015. The additional checks define that the vehicle must have headlights which dip to the right, rear fog lights on the left side, an external mirror on the left side of the vehicle which allows a 2.5M field of view at a distance of 10M to the rear of the mirror and a speedometer in km/h (possibly in addition to mp/h)

The ministerial order to allow registration of right hand drive vehicles was published on 31 July 2015, and came into operation 14 days later on 15 August 2015.

== See also ==
- European Court of Justice
- The European Commission
