= GS Media v Sanoma =

2016 European Court of Justice case

- European Court of Justice

Submitted 7 April 2015 Decided : 8 September 2016
- Full case name: GS Media BV v Sanoma Media Netherlands BV, Playboy Enterprises International Inc., Britt Geertruida Dekker
- Case: 160/15
- CelexID: 62015CN0160
- ECLI: ECLI:EU:C:2016:644
- Chamber: Second chamber
- Language of proceedings: Dutch
- Nationality of parties: Netherlands
- Procedural history: Reference of the Supreme Court (Hoge Raad) of the Netherlands

Court composition
- Judge-Rapporteur; M. Ilešič
- President; C. Toader
- Judges: A. Rosas; A. Prechal; E. Jarašiūnas
- Advocate General; M. Wathelet

GS Media BV v Sanoma Media Netherlands BV and Others (C-160/15) is a case decided by the European Court of Justice. The case regards a request for a Preliminary ruling by the Supreme Court of the Netherlands on whether hyperlinking to a public third-party website that contains work(s) published without the consent of the rightholder constitutes a "communication to the public" within the meaning of article 3 of the Copyright Directive.

The case was decided on 8 September 2016, following the opinion of the Advocate General of 7 April 2016. The Court decided that linking to freely available material placed on the internet without consent of the rights holder(s) constitutes a communication to the public (and thus possibly copyright infringement) if the person placing those links knew this consent was not given. If the link is placed "for profit" to infringing content, the linker is presumed to know about the lack of consent and thus presumed to make a communication to the public.

== Facts ==
Geenstijl.nl (owned by GS Media) is a Dutch blog that publishes news, revelations and journalism. It reports having about 230,000 visitors a day and is one of the better read Dutch blogs.

In October 2011 Geenstijl received a message from an anonymous source about photographs of Britt Dekker on the Australian website FileFactory, which were to be published in the December 2011 Dutch edition of Playboy Magazine, published by Sanoma. Before Geenstijl published the link to the photographs, Sanoma requested Geenstijl not to do so. Geenstijl however published a post about the photographs including a hyperlink to the FileFactory from where the photographs could be found. The link on FileFactory went to a webpage, from where a zip file containing the photographs could be downloaded.

Sanoma requested GS Media to delete the hyperlink in the article and summoned FileFactory to delete the file of its servers. FileFactory complied with this request the same day.

After Geenstijl received another summons, the blog published an article on it in which it included a hyperlink to Imageshack where some of the photographs still were hosted. The third and last time a hyperlink to the photographs were posted by Geenstijl was in November 2011.

== First Instance and Appeal decisions ==
The Amsterdam District Court concluded that the hyperlinks published by Geenstijl constituted a "communication to the public" in the sense of article 3 of the Infosoc Directive. as the link allowed a "new public" to reach the photographs. The Court held that it was of particular interest that Geenstijl benefitted from the influx of visitors, and the court took in to account the repeated requests to delete the hyperlinks by Sanoma. The District Court finally held that there was a breach of copyright law and awarded damages.

The Court of Appeal partially overturned this decision and held that as the internet is an openly accessible network, the person that publishes the work on the internet is (in this case: the person placing the photographs on FileFactory) the one that communicates it to the public. The Court compared a hyperlink to a footnote in a book. Sanoma did not agree and argued that these specific files were not accessible to the public unless someone was handed the key to the "digital safe". Geenstijl argued anyone with the link could download the files and the location of the files could be indexed by search engines. The court agreed with the position of Geenstijl on this argument, but held that while no copyright infringement had taken place, Geenstijl had committed a tort by placing the links.

== At the Supreme Court of the Netherlands ==
At the Supreme Court of the Netherlands the main question is whether there is a "communication to the public" in the case of a hyperlink to a website where the work is published without consent of the rightholder, taking into account that the work had never been published before.

The Supreme court relies on the previous decisions on hyperlinking in the ECJ cases Svensson and BestWater. The Svensson case related to a case where the work was published with consent of the rightholder, before the hyperlinking happened. The criterion set out by the European Court of Justice constituted that it was of importance that the rightholder of the work had foreseen this extent of the audience at the time of the time of giving consent to communicating the work to that audience. In the case of Svensson that could be any internet user as it had no restrictive measures in place for its work to be found on the internet.

In the BestWater case a YouTube clip (placed on YouTube by the rights holder) was embedded without consent. There was no communication to a new public, because the access to the original video was not restricted. The case discussed whether embedding could still amount to communication to a new public, because the video was shown on another website. The European Court of Justice held that embedding videos that are freely available does not constitute an infringement under article 3.

According to the Supreme Court it is necessary, in line with jurisprudence of the European Court of Justice, that for a "communication to the public" the following criteria are satisfied:

- A sizeable, not originally by the rightholder targeted, audience can be reached (a communication)
- This is a new audience, that has not been reached by a previous communication to the public (to the public)

The Supreme Court concluded that there is not enough material in the Svensson and BestWater cases to answer the current question of GS Media v. Playboy. It has to consider whether with the hyperlinking a new audience has been reached. The courts held that hyperlinking to a source that is already open for anyone would not constitute a communication to a new audience, however in the Svensson case this had been done by the rights holder. It notes from a practical view that there is much content available on the internet without consent of the rightholder, therefore it is hard to find out whether a hyperlink is aimed at a work with consent of the rightholder or not.

For the reasons mentioned above the Supreme Court decided to ask prejudicial questions to the European Court of Justice.

== Questions referred the European Court of Justice ==
The questions that were asked by the Dutch Supreme Court are:

- 1(a) If anyone other than the copyright holder refers by means of a hyperlink on a website controlled by him to a website which is managed by a third party and is accessible to the general internet public, on which the work has been made available without the consent of the rightholder, does that constitute a ‘communication to the public’ within the meaning of Article 3(1) of Directive 2001/29?
- 1(b) Does it make any difference if the work was also not previously communicated, with the rightholder's consent, to the public in some other way?
- 1(c) Is it important whether the 'hyperlinker' is or ought to be aware of the lack of consent by the rightholder for the placement of the work on the third party's website mentioned in 1(a) above and, as the case may be, of the fact that the work has also not previously been communicated, with the rightholder's consent, to the public in some other way?
- 2(a) If the answer to question 1(a) is in the negative: in that case, is there, or could there be deemed to be, a communication to the public if the website to which the hyperlink refers, and thus the work, is indeed findable for the general internet public, but not easily so, with the result that the publication of the hyperlink greatly facilitates the finding of the work?
- 2(b) In answering question 2(a), is it important whether the ‘hyperlinker’ is or ought to be aware of the fact that the website to which the hyperlink refers is not easily findable by the general internet public?
- 3. Are there other circumstances which should be taken into account when answering the question whether there is deemed to be a communication to the public if, by means of a hyperlink, access is provided to a work which has not previously been communicated to the public with the consent of the rightholder?
