= Chen v Home Secretary =

Decision of the European Court of Justice

- European Court of Justice

Decided 19 October 2004
- Full case name: Man Lavette Chen and Kunqian Catherine Zhu v Secretary of State for the Home Department
- Case: C-200/02
- CelexID: 62002CJ0200
- ECLI: ECLI:EU:C:2004:639
- Chamber: Full court
- Nationality of parties: Ireland; China

Ruling
- In circumstances like those of the main proceedings, Article 18 EC and Council Directive 90/364/EEC of 28 June 1990 on the right of residence confer on a young minor who is a national of a Member State, is covered by appropriate sickness insurance and is in the care of a parent who is a third-country national having sufficient resources for that minor not to become a burden on the public finances of the host Member State, a right to reside for an indefinite period in that State. In such circumstances, those same provisions allow a parent who is that minor's primary carer to reside with the child in the host Member State.

Court composition
- Judge Rapporteur; José Narciso da Cunha Rodrigues
- Advocate General; Antonio Tizzano

Chen v Home Secretary was a decision of the European Court of Justice which decided that a minor who is a national of a European Union member state has the right to reside in the European Union with his or her third-country national parents, provided the minor and parents have health insurance and will not become a burden on the public finances of the member state of residence.

This case led to the Twenty-seventh Amendment of the Constitution of Ireland, which limited the constitutional right to Irish citizenship of individuals born on the island of Ireland to the children of Irish citizens and some others whose parents are not Irish citizens but who meet the prescribed criteria.

== Facts ==
Kunqian Catherine Zhu was born on 16 September 2000 in Belfast to Chinese parents who were living in Wales (part of the United Kingdom) and working for a Chinese firm there. The child's mother, Man Lavette Chen, had selected Northern Ireland as a birthplace for her daughter so that she could gain Irish nationality. As Catherine's parents were only temporary migrants in the UK, she was not eligible for British citizenship simply by virtue of birth in the United Kingdom, as the United Kingdom abolished automatic jus soli in 1983.

However, by being born in Belfast, Catherine was entitled to Irish citizenship because at that time, anyone born on the island of Ireland had the automatic, unrestricted right to Irish citizenship. Thus, Chen obtained Irish citizenship for Catherine with the intention of using Catherine's status as a European Union citizen to move the family permanently to Cardiff, Wales. However, British authorities rejected the family's application for permits to reside permanently in the United Kingdom. On appeal, adjudicator Michael Shrimpton of the Immigration Appellate Authority referred the decision to the European Court of Justice, which ruled that, as a citizen of the European Union, Catherine Zhu had a right under Article 18 of the EC Treaty to reside anywhere in the EU, and that denying residency to her parents at a time when she is unable to look after herself would conflict with this basic right.

Advocate General Tizzano stated that it was not an abuse of EU rights to take advantage of the Irish citizenship rules because it is for the Member States and not the EU to decide whether to confer citizenship on a person.

== Judgment ==
The court ruled:

Article 1(2)(b) of Directive 90/364, which guarantees ‘dependent’ relatives in the ascending line of the holder of the right of residence the right to install themselves with the holder of the right of residence, regardless of their nationality, cannot confer a right of residence on a national of a non-member country in Mrs Chen’s situation either by reason of the emotional bonds between mother and child or on the ground that the mother’s right to enter and reside in the United Kingdom is dependent on her child’s right of residence.

According to the case-law of the Court, the status of ‘dependent’ member of the family of a holder of a right of residence is the result of a factual situation characterised by the fact that material support for the family member is provided by the holder of the right of residence.

In circumstances such as those of the main proceedings, the position is exactly the opposite in that the holder of the right of residence is dependent on the national of a non-member country who is her carer and wishes to accompany her. In those circumstances, Mrs Chen cannot claim to be a ‘dependent’ relative of Catherine in the ascending line within the meaning of Directive 90/364 with a view to having the benefit of a right of residence in the United Kingdom.

On the other hand, a refusal to allow the parent, whether a national of a Member State or a national of a non-member country, who is the carer of a child to whom Article 18 EC and Directive 90/364 grant a right of residence, to reside with that child in the host Member State would deprive the child’s right of residence of any useful effect. It is clear that enjoyment by a young child of a right of residence necessarily implies that the child is entitled to be accompanied by the person who is his or her primary carer and accordingly that the carer must be in a position to reside with the child in the host Member State for the duration of such residence.

== See also ==
- Articles 2 and 3 of the Constitution of Ireland
- British nationality law
- British nationality law and the Republic of Ireland
- Chavez-Vilchez (C-133/15)
- Citizenship of the European Union
- Common Travel Area
- Irish nationality law
- United States v. Wong Kim Ark
