= List of members of the European Court of Justice =

The following is a list of all past and present members of the European Court of Justice in the official order of precedence:

As of 13 July 2026:

Year	Member State	Members of the European Court of Justice	President	Judge	Adv. Gen.
1952–1958	Italy	Massimo Pilotti	1952–1958		
1952–1958	Netherlands	Jos Serrarens		1952–1958	
1952–1963	Germany	Otto Riese		1952–1963	
1952–1967	Belgium	Louis Delvaux		1952–1967	
1952–1962	France	Jacques Rueff		1952–1962	
1952–1967	Luxembourg	Charles Léon Hammes	1964–1967	1952–1964	
1952–1958	Netherlands	Adrianus van Kleffens		1952–1958	
1952–1964	France	Maurice Lagrange			1952–1964
1953–1973	Germany	Karl Roemer			1953–1973
1958–1964	Italy	Rino Rossi		1958–1964	
1958–1979	Netherlands	Andreas Matthias Donner	1958–1964	1964–1979	
1958–1961	Italy	Nicola Catalano		1958–1961	
1962–1976	Italy	Alberto Trabucchi		1962–1972	1973–1976
1962–1976	France	Robert Lecourt	1967–1976	1962–1967	
1963–1970	Germany	Walter Strauss		1963–1970	
1964–1976	Italy	Riccardo Monaco		1964–1976	
1964–1970	France	Joseph Gand			1964–1970
1967–1984	Belgium	Josse Mertens de Wilmars	1980–1984	1967–1980	
1967–1985	Luxembourg	Pierre Pescatore		1967–1985	
1970–1980	Germany	Hans Kutscher	1976–1980	1970–1976	
1970–1972	France	Alain Louis Dutheillet de Lamothe			1970–1972
1972–1981	France	Henri Mayras			1972–1981
1973–1974	Ireland	Cearbhall Ó Dálaigh		1973–1974	
1973–1979	Denmark	Max Sørensen		1973–1979	
1973–1988	United Kingdom	Alexander Mackenzie Stuart	1984–1988	1973–1984	
1973–1981	United Kingdom	Jean-Pierre Warner			1973–1981
1973–1981	Germany	Gerhard Reischl			1973–1981
1975–1985	Ireland	Aindrias Ó Caoimh		1975–1985	
1976–1982	Italy	Francesco Capotorti		1976–1976	1976–1982
1976–1988	Italy	Giacinto Bosco		1976–1988	
1976–1982	France	Adolphe Touffait		1976–1982	
1979–1990	Netherlands	Thijmen Koopmans		1979–1990	
1979–1994	Denmark	Ole Due	1988–1994	1979–1988	
1980–1988	Germany	Ulrich Everling		1980–1988	
1981–1982	Greece	Alexandros Chloros		1981–1982	
1981–1992	United Kingdom	Gordon Slynn		1988–1992	1981–1988
1981–1984	France	Simone Rozès			1981–1984
1981–1986	Netherlands	Pieter verLoren van Themaat			1981–1986
1981–1982; 1988–1994	France	Fernand Grévisse		1981–1982; 1988–1994	
1982–1988	Germany	Kai Bahlmann		1982–1988	
1982–1999	Italy	Giuseppe Federico Mancini		1988–1999	1982–1988
1982–1988	France	Yves Galmot		1982–1988	
1983–1997	Greece	Constantinos Kakouris		1983–1997	
1984–1997	Germany	Carl Otto Lenz			1984–1997
1984–1994	France	Marco Darmon			1984–1994
1984–1995	Belgium	René Joliet		1984–1995	
1985–1991	Ireland	Thomas Francis O'Higgins		1985–1991	
1985–1996	Luxembourg	Fernand Schockweiler		1985–1996	
1986–1991; 1997–2003	Luxembourg	Jean Mischo			1986–1991; 1997–2003
1986–2000	Portugal	José Carlos de Carvalho Moitinho de Almeida		1986–2000	
1986–1988; 2012–2018	Portugal	José Luís da Cruz Vilaça		2012–2018	1986–1988
1986–2003	Spain	Gil Carlos Rodriguez Iglesias	1994–2003	1986–1994	
1988–1994	Spain	Manuel Diez de Velasco		1988–1994	
1988–1994	Germany	Manfred Zuleeg		1988–1994	
1988–1994	Belgium	Walter van Gerven			1988–1994
1988–2006	United Kingdom	Francis G. Jacobs			1988–2006
1988–1998	Italy	Giuseppe Tesauro			1988–1998
1990–2000	Netherlands	Paul Joan George Kapteyn		1990–2000	
1991–2006	Denmark	Claus Christian Gulmann		1994–2006	1991–1994
1991–1999	Ireland	John L. Murray		1991–1999	
1992–2004	United Kingdom	David Edward		1992–2004	
1994–2006	Italy	Antonio Mario La Pergola		1994–1994; 1999–2006	1995–1999
1994–2000	Greece	Georges Cosmas			1994–2000
1994–2000	Germany	Günter Hirsch		1994–2000	
1994–1997	Denmark	Michael Bendik Elmer			1994–1997
1994–2006	France	Jean-Pierre Puissochet		1994–2006	
1994–2006	France	Philippe Léger			1994–2006
1995–2000	Sweden	Hans Ragnemalm		1995–2000	
1995–2002	Finland	Leif Sevón		1995–2002	
1995–2000	Ireland	Nial Fennelly			1995–2000
1995–2003; 2012–2018	Belgium	Melchior Wathelet		1995–2003	2012–2018
1995–2009	Austria	Peter Jann		1995–2009	
1995–2009	Spain	Dámaso Ruiz-Jarabo Colomer			1995–2009
1996–2007	Luxembourg	Romain Schintgen		1996–2008	
1997–1999	Greece	Krateros Ioannou		1997–1999	
1997–2003	Germany	Siegbert Alber			1997–2003
1998–2000	Italy	Antonio Saggio			1998–2000
1999–2015	Greece	Vassilios Skouris	2003–2015	1999–2003	
1999–2004	Ireland	Fidelma O’Kelly Macken		1999–2004	
2000–2006	Germany	Ninon Colneric		2000–2006	
2000–2006	Sweden	Stig von Bahr		2000–2006	
2000–2018	Italy	Antonio Tizzano		2006–2018	2000–2006
2000–2012	Portugal	José Narciso da Cunha Rodrigues		2000–2012	
2000–2010	Netherlands	Christiaan Timmermans		2000–2010	
2000–2006	Netherlands	Ad Geelhoed			2000–2006
2000–2006	Austria	Christine Stix-Hackl			2000–2006
2002–2019	Finland	Allan Rosas		2002–2019	
2003–2021	Spain	Rosario Silva de Lapuerta		2003–2021	
2003–present	Belgium	Koen Lenaerts	2015–present	2003–2015	
2003–present	Germany	Juliane Kokott			2003–present
2003–2009	Portugal	Luís Miguel Poiares Pessoa Maduro			2003–2009
2004–2012	United Kingdom	Hermann Theodor Schiemann		2004–2012	
2004–2009	Poland	Jerzy Makarczyk		2004–2009	
2004–2010	Lithuania	Pranas Kūris		2004–2010	
2004–2021	Hungary	Endre Juhász		2004–2021	
2004–2014	Cyprus	George Arestis		2004–2014	
2004–2018	Malta	Anthony Borg Barthet		2004–2018	
2004–2024	Slovenia	Marko Ilešič		2004–2024	
2004–2020	Czech Republic	Jiří Malenovský		2004–2020	
2004–2009	Slovakia	Ján Klučka		2004–2009	
2004–2013	Estonia	Uno Lõhmus		2004–2013	
2004–2019	Latvia	Egils Levits		2004–2019	
2004–2015	Ireland	Aindrias Ó Caoimh		2004–2015	
2006–2024	Denmark	Lars Bay Larsen		2006–2024	
2006–2020	United Kingdom	Eleanor Sharpston			2006–2020
2006–2018	Italy	Paolo Mengozzi			2006–2018
2006–2011	Sweden	Pernilla Lindh		2006–2011	
2006–2024	France	Jean-Claude Bonichot		2006–2024	
2006–present	Germany	Thomas von Danwitz		2006–present	
2006–2019	France	Yves Bot			2006–2019
2006–2012	Slovakia	Ján Mazák			2006–2012
2006–2012	Slovenia	Verica Trstenjak			2006–2012
2007–2025	Bulgaria	Alexander Arabadjiev		2007–2025	
2007–2021	Romania	Camelia Toader		2007–2021	
2008–2013	Luxembourg	Jean-Jacques Kasel		2008–2013	
2009–2024	Poland	Marek Safjan		2009–2024	
2009–2021	Slovakia	Daniel Šváby		2009–2021	
2009–2019	Austria	Maria Berger		2009–2019	
2009–2015; 2019–present	Finland	Niilo Jääskinen		2019–present	2009–2015
2009–2015	Spain	Pedro Cruz Villalón			2009–2015
2010–2024	Netherlands	Sacha Prechal		2010–2024	
2010–2018	Lithuania	Egidijus Jarašiūnas		2010–2018	
2011–2019	Sweden	Carl Gustav Fernlund		2011–2019	
2012–2020	United Kingdom	Christopher Vajda		2012–2020	
2012–2024	Sweden	Nils Wahl		2019–2024	2012–2019
2013–present	Croatia	Siniša Rodin		2013–present	
2013–present	Luxembourg	François Biltgen		2013–present	
2013–present	Estonia	Küllike Jürimäe		2013–present	
2013–present	Poland	Maciej Szpunar			2013–present
2014–present	Cyprus	Constantinos Lycourgos		2014–present	
2015–2021	Czech Republic	Michal Bobek			2015–2021
2015–present	Spain	Manuel Campos Sánchez Bordona			2015–present
2015–present	Ireland	Eugene Regan		2015–present	
2015–2021	Denmark	Henrik Saugmandsgaard Øe			2015–2021
2015–2021	Greece	Michail Vilaras		2015–2021	
2016–2021	Bulgaria	Evgeni Tanchev			2016–2021
2018–2024	Malta	Peter George Xuereb		2018–2024	
2018–present	Portugal	Nuno José Cardoso da Silva Piçarra		2018–present	
2018–2024	Italy	Lucia Serena Rossi		2018–2024	
2018–2021	Ireland	Gerard Hogan			2018–2021
2018–2023	Italy	Giovanni Pitruzzella			2018–2023
2018–present	Lithuania	Irmantas Jarukaitis		2018–present	
2019–2024	Estonia	Priit Pikamäe			2019–2024
2019–present	Austria	Andreas Kumin		2019–present	
2020–present	France	Jean Richard de la Tour			2020–present
2020–present	Greece	Athanasios Rantos			2020–present
2020–present	Latvia	Ineta Ziemele		2020–present	
2020–present	Czech Republic	Jan Passer		2020–present	
2021–present	Greece	Dimitrios Gratsias		2021–present	
2021–present	Spain	Maria Lourdes Arastey Sahún		2021–present	
2021–2024	Ireland	Anthony Collins			2021–2024
2021–present	Slovakia	Miroslav Gavalec		2021–present	
2021–2026	Cyprus	Nicholas Emiliou			2021–2026
2021–present	Hungary	Zoltán Csehi		2021–present	
2021–present	Romania	Octavia Spineanu-Matei		2021–present	
2021–present	Croatia	Tamara Ćapeta			2021–present
2021–present	Latvia	Laila Medina			2021–present
2024–present	Netherlands	Bernardus Smulders		2024–present	
2024–present	Luxembourg	Dean Spielmann			2024–present
2024–present	Italy	Massimo Condinanzi		2024–present	
2024–present	Sweden	Fredrik Schalin		2024–present	
2024–present	Italy	Andrea Biondi			2024–present
2024–present	France	Stéphane Gervasoni		2024–present	
2024–present	Denmark	Niels Fenger		2024–present	
2024–present	Malta	Ramona Frendo		2024–present	
2024–present	Lithuania	Rimvydas Norkus			2024–present
2025–present	Slovenia	Marko Bošnjak		2025–present	
2025–present	Bulgaria	Alexander Kornezov		2025–present	
2026–present	Cyprus	Stéphanie Laulhé Shaelou			2026–present

== Sources ==
- Current members, European Court of Justice.
- Former members, European Court of Justice.
