= Webb v EMO Air Cargo (UK) Ltd (No 2) =

- Court: European Court of Justice
- Citations: (1994) C-32/93, [1994] ECR I-3567, [1995] ICR 1021

Keywords
- Pregnancy discrimination

Webb v EMO Air Cargo (UK) Ltd (No 2) (1994) is a UK labour law and EU labour law case, concerning discrimination against a pregnant woman. It held that no comparator (for instance to a sick man) is necessary to establish discrimination against a pregnant woman. It was unusual in that Carol Louise Webb, the applicant, was represented throughout by a community law centre, the Hillingdon Legal Resource Centre (HLRC), later renamed the Hillingdon Law Centre, the only time that a British law centre case went to the European Court of Justice. The law centre's in-house barrister Michael Shrimpton argued the case before the Industrial Tribunal at London North in February 1988. He was also junior counsel to the late John Melville Williams QC in the Employment Appeal Tribunal and, by then in private practice, appeared at the compensation hearing in 1999. The case was one of the longest-running in British legal history.

== Facts ==
EMO Air Cargo had an employee called Mrs Stewart who had taken maternity leave. Miss Webb was hired to replace Mrs Stewart, though it was envisaged that she would stay on working after Mrs Stewart came back. Then, however, it transpired that Miss Webb was also pregnant and due to give birth at around the same time as Mrs Stewart. Miss Webb was dismissed. She claimed this was sex discrimination under SDA 1975 s 1(1). The employer argued she was unable to carry out the tasks for which she was recruited.

The Court of Appeal held that a sick man, who was the appropriate comparator, would have been treated similarly. The House of Lords referred to the ECJ.

== Judgment ==
=== European Court of Justice ===
The ECJ referred to the Dekker case and reaffirmed that pregnancy discrimination was sex discrimination. There is no need for a comparison with a man who is ill. This followed from article 2(1) and article 5(1) of Directives 76/207/EEC and 92/85/EC. The ECJ's ruling was mutatis mutandis along the lines of the argument put before the Industrial Tribunal and prepared entirely in-house by Hillingdon law centre.

=== House of Lords ===
The House of Lords applied the decision of the ECJ. Lord Keith had said, ‘The relevant circumstance for purposes of the comparison required by section 5(3) to be made is expected unavailability at the material time… [though the] precise reason for the unavailability is not a relevant circumstance, and in particular it is not relevant that the reason is a condition which is capable of affecting only women or, for that matter, only men’. However, now Lord Keith said when the answer had returned from the ECJ the following.

... in a case where a woman is engaged for an indefinite period, the fact that the reason why she will be temporarily unavailable for work at a time when to her knowledge her services will be particularly required is pregnancy is a circumstance relevant to her case, being a circumstance which could not be present in the case of the hypothetical man.

== See also ==
- UK labour law
- EU labour law
