= Kelly v Trinity College Dublin =

Irish Supreme Court case

- Coat of arms of Ireland
- Court: Supreme Court of Ireland
- Full case name: Patrick Kelly v The Visitors of the College of the Holy and Undivided Trinity of Queen Elizabeth near Dublin
- Decided: December 14, 2007
- Citations: Kelly v TCD [2007] IESC 61 (14 December 2007), Supreme Court (Ireland)

Case history
- Appealed from: High Court

Court membership
- Judges sitting: Fennelly J., Macken J., Finnegan J.

Case opinions
- The Irish Supreme Court reviewed and restated the law on objective bias in Ireland
- Decision by: Fennelly, J.
- Concurrence: Macken J.; Finnegan J

Keywords
- Bias; Supreme Court; Disciplinary Tribunal

Kelly v Trinity College Dublin [2007] IESC 61; [2007] 12 JIC 1411; is an Irish Supreme Court case in which the Court held that former employments or associations are insufficient, in the absence of other evidence, to disqualify a person from participating in disciplinary or similar tribunals related to that former employment.

== Background ==
Kelly (a student of Trinity College Dublin at the time) made a complaint of bullying against a member of staff. Following internal investigations which rejected his complaint, Kelly appealed to the Visitors to Trinity College Dublin ("Visitors" are part of the oversight structure of Trinity College Dublin). The Visitors decided that they had no jurisdiction to consider the complaint.

Kelly sought to apply for the judicial review of this decision of the Visitors on the basis of the "composition of the Visitors and alleges bias". The application for judicial review was dismissed in the High Court (Abbot J) and was appealed directly to the Supreme Court pursuant to Order 58, Rule 13 of the Rules of the Superior Courts.

Amongst the grounds on which judicial review was sought was that one of the Visitors, Professor Sagarra, was disqualified from the role by reason of objective bias as she had previously been employed by the university and had become a Pro-Chancellor of the university in 1999. Kelly claimed on Professor Sagarra's appointment as Pro-Chancellor she had sworn that she would "uphold the best interests of the University" and so by reason of her career and background, Professor Sagarra would be naturally biased in favour of the university. In making the claim of objective bias, Kelly relied on the test set out by Keane CJ in

He relied on Orange Communications Ltd. v. Director of Telecoms (No. 2) [2000] IESC 79; [2000] 4 IR 159 in which Keane C.J. defined objective bias as the apprehension "that the decision will be set aside on the ground of objective bias where there is a reasonable apprehension or suspicion that the decision maker might have been biased, i.e. where it is found that, although there was no actual bias, there is an appearance of bias."

== Holding of the Supreme Court ==
Fennelly J delivered the sole written judgment, with whom the other judges agreed.

The Supreme Court held that Kelly had not established an arguable case of objective bias against the decision of Professor Sagarra in her role as a Visitor. Noting that "former employments or association" are not sufficient in and of themselves to disqualify someone from participating in a disciplinary or similar tribunal and that Professor Sagarra's position as Pro-Chancellor did not undermine her ability to bring a "fresh and independent mind" to the matters before the Visitors, the Supreme Court cautioned against attempting to list the factors that may or may not give rise to a risk of bias. Citing from the English Court of Appeal case, Locabail (U.K.) Ltd. v. Bayfield Properties Ltd [2000] 2 WLR 870; [2000] QB 451, the Supreme Court noted that "[e]verything will depend on the facts"

The Supreme Court therefore held that it would not be a justified step to disqualify an otherwise qualified person from performing an adjudicative role merely because of that person's previous profession, social links or background.

During the hearing Kelly also objected to the presence of Macken J on the Supreme Court bench for this case on the basis that Macken J was a graduate of Trinity College Dublin and had been a law lecturer there. This fact was raised by the judges prior to the hearing, but it was only after the hearing had commenced that Kelly raised an objection. The Supreme Court rejected this objection on the basis that past associations by themselves are not sufficient to establish objective bias and do not disqualify judges from performing their professional duties.

== Subsequent developments ==
This case was subsequently cited with approval in O'Reilly v Lee [2008] IESC 21, [2008] 4 IR 269 where the Supreme Court in this case to establish that the fact that the President of the High Court appoints certain persons to the Solicitors Disciplinary Tribunal does not, of itself, render the President of the High Court objectively biased. It was also cited with approval in R.V. (A Minor Suing by his Mother and Next Friend K.M.) v Secretary General of the Department of Education and Science, James Hayes, Nora Mary O'Riordan and Elaine Collins (Respondents) and The Board of Management of a School (Notice Party) [2019] IEHC 595 and O'Ceallaigh v An Bord Altranais [2011] IESC 50.
