= Christine Stix-Hackl =

Austrian jurist (1957–2018)

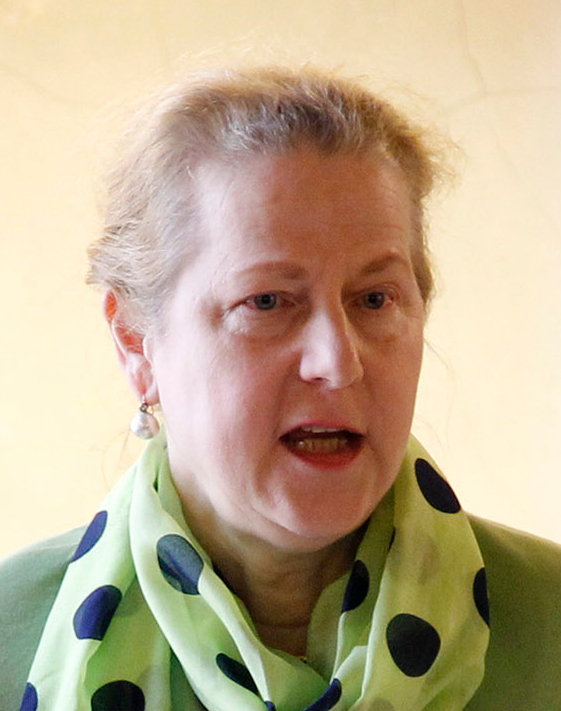
Christine Stix-Hackl in 2015

Christine Stix-Hackl (1957 – 24 October 2018), Austrian jurist, Advocate General at the European Court of Justice from 2000 to 2006. Christine Stix-Hackl has been the second woman in the history of the European Court of Justice to take the position as Premier Avocat général in 2005. She was the Austrian Ambassador in the Grand Duchy of Luxembourg between 2007 and 2012. Christine Stix-Hackl now presents her credentials Permanent Representative of Austria to the United Nations (Vienna), IAEA, UNIDO and CTBTO since June 2012.

== Biography ==
Doctor of Laws (PhD) (University of Vienna), postgraduate studies in European Law at the College of Europe, [Bruges]. She was a member of the Austrian Diplomatic Service (from 1982) and an expert on European Union matters, acting as Legal Adviser to the Ministry of Foreign Affairs (1985–88); Traineeship at the Legal Service of the European Commission (1989); Expert in the Legal Service of the European Commission, Brussels (1989) and in the Office of the Legal Adviser (1987-1988); "Legal Service – EU" in the Austrian Ministry of Foreign Affairs (1992–2000, Minister Plenipotentiary); participated in the negotiations on the European Economic Area and on the accession of the Republic of Austria to the European Union; Agent of the Republic of Austria at the Court of Justice of the European Communities from 1995; Head of the European Union-Legal Service in the Federal Ministry (1992-2000); Austrian Consul-General in Zurich (2000); Permanent Agent of the Republic of Austria in proceedings before the Court of Justice of the European Union; Head of the Austrian delegation in the EU Council Working Group on the Court of Justice and chair of the Working Group during first Austrian Presidency of the European Union (1995-2000);

Academic Activities : Teaching assignments, inter alia, at Vienna University, Vienna University of Economics and Business Administration, Austrian Federal Administrative Academy, University of St. Gallen (Switzerland) and University of Saarbrücken (Germany). Her publications on European Union topics are numerous. She died on 24 October 2018, aged 60.

== See also ==
- List of members of the European Court of Justice
