= Dámaso Ruiz-Jarabo Colomer =

Spanish jurist and judge

Dámaso Ruiz-Jarabo Colomer (20 June 1949 – 11 November 2009) was a Spanish jurist, judge at the Consejo General del Poder Judicial (General Council of the Judiciary) and the head of the Private Office of the President of the Consejo General del Poder Judicial. He also served as an ad hoc judge to the European Court of Human Rights and a judge at the Tribunal Supremo (Supreme Court) from 1996. He was an Advocate General at the European Court of Justice from January 1995 until his death in November 2009.

Ruiz-Jarabo was born in Madrid; he was unmarried with no children; he died in Luxembourg, aged 60.

== See also ==
- List of members of the European Court of Justice
