= Commission and Others v Kadi =

Case in the European Court of Justice

Commission and Others v Kadi (fully European Commission and Others v Yassin Abdullah Kadi, C-584/10 P, judgment ECLI:EU:C:2013:518) was a case in the European Court of Justice, an appeal from the earlier case Kadi v Commission (T-85/09) in the General Court. The Court of Justice, by dismissing the appeal, confirmed the General Court’s annulment of restrictive measures directed against Yassin Kadi. The case, known as Kadi II, was a sequel to the case Kadi I, in which Council regulations based on United Nations Security Council decisions were reviewed under EU human rights standards and consequently annulled.
