= Pierre Pescatore =

Luxembourgish professor and judge

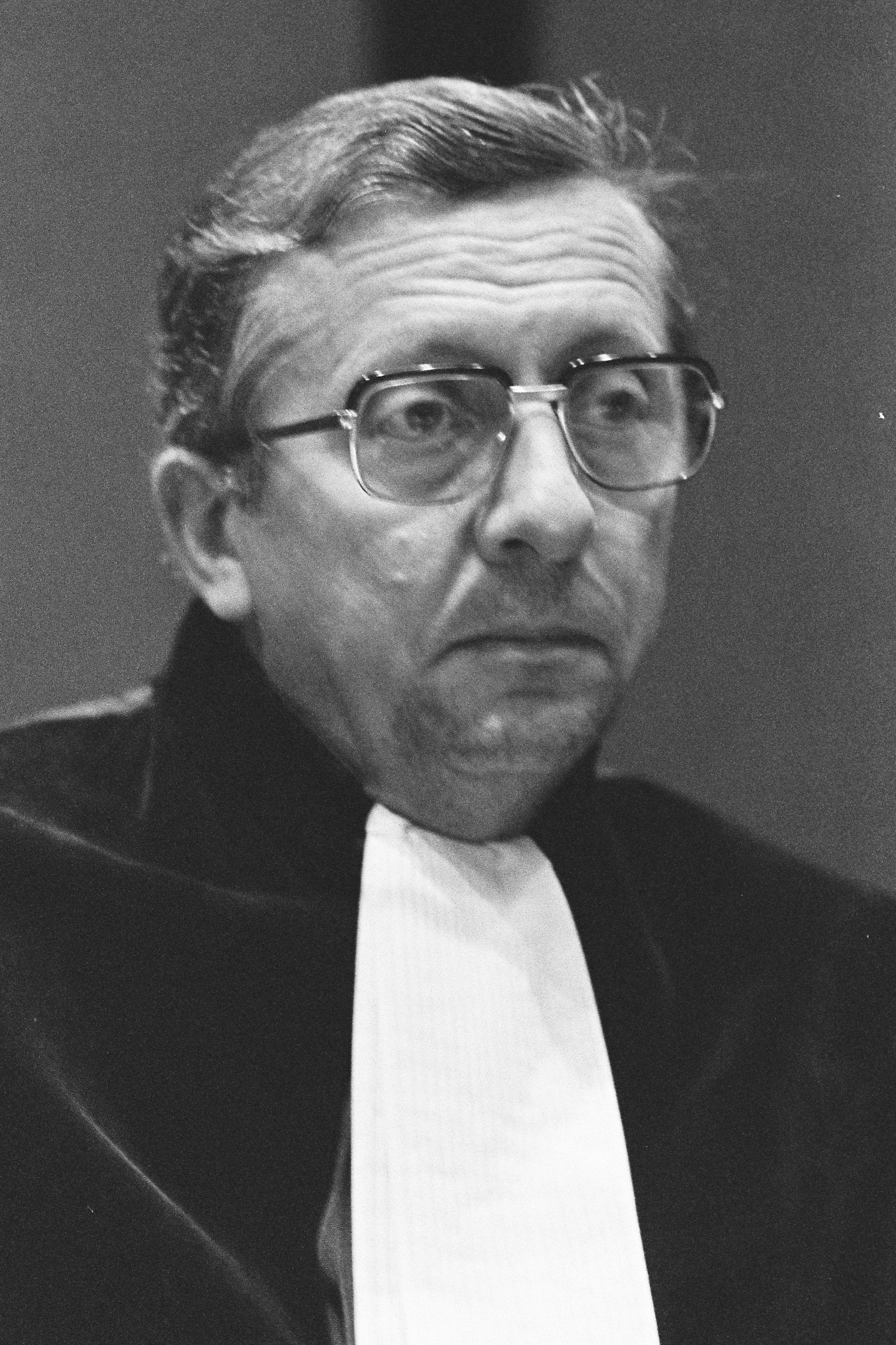
Pescatore in 1976

Pierre Pescatore (20 November 1919 – 2 February 2010) was a Luxembourgish professor and a judge at the European Court of Justice.

Pescatore was one of the representatives of Luxembourg's government at the negotiations of the Treaty of Rome, while he worked in the Ministry for Foreign Affairs from 1946 to 1967. He held various positions at different universities from 1951 onwards. Pescatore served as judge at the Court of Justice from 9 October 1967 to 7 October 1985.

== Publications ==
- The law of integration : emergence of a new phenomenon in international relations, based on the experience of the European Communities. Leiden : Sijthoff, 1974.
- Le droit de l'integration : emergence d'un phenomene nouveau dans les relations internationales selon l'experience des Communautes europeennes. Leiden : Sijthoff, 1972.
- L'Union Économique Belgo-Luxembourgeoise: expériences et perspectives d'avenir, Chronique de Politique Étrangère, 1965.

== See also ==
- List of members of the European Court of Justice

== Sources ==
- Former Members, European Court of Justice official website.
- Death of Pierre Pescatore, EU Law Blog.
