= Jerzy Makarczyk =

Polish lawyer (1938–2025)

Jerzy Michał Makarczyk (1938 – 30 July 2025) was a Polish lawyer.

Makarczyk represented Poland in the European Court of Human Rights (1999–2002). He was appointed a judge from Poland to the European Court of Justice on 11 May 2004 and served until 2009. He died on 30 July 2025.

== See also ==
- List of members of the European Court of Justice
