= Juliane Kokott =

German Advocate General

- Occupation: Advocate General

Juliane Kokott is the German Advocate General at the Court of Justice of the European Union (CJEU) and Professor at the University of St. Gallen.

== Education ==
Kokott studied law in Bonn and Geneva. Subsequent to her studies, she earned the academic title of Master of Laws (LL.M.) at the American University (AU) Washington, D.C., while being on a scholarship of the Fulbright Program. There she also worked as an Assistant to Thomas Buergenthal, Judge at the International Court of Justice (ICJ) and former president of the Inter-American Court of Human Rights. She worked as a judicial intern at the Landgericht Heidelberg and the Federal Constitutional Court of Germany (Bundesverfassungsgericht) in Karlsruhe, whilst also being employed at the Max Planck Institute for Comparative Public Law and International Law, Heidelberg. She concluded her doctorate (Dr. iur. utr.) at the University of Heidelberg with the dissertation titled "The Inter-American System for the Protection of Human Rights" ("Das interamerikanische System zum Schutz der Menschenrechte").

Kokott also earned a diploma from the Académie Internationale de Droit Constitutionnel in Tunis. As bearer of the Otto Hahn Medal of the Max Planck Society for junior scientists, she concluded another study visit at Harvard Law School and was awarded the academic degree of Doctor of Juridical Science (S.J.D.).

== Career ==
After her habilitation at the University of Heidelberg, Kokott taught at the Universities of Mannheim, Augsburg and Düsseldorf. From 2000 until her call to the ECJ, she headed the Institute for European Law, Public International Law and international business law at the University of St. Gallen, Switzerland with the correspondent professorship.

On 7 October 2003, Kokott succeeded Siegbert Alber as Advocate General at the Court of Justice of the European Union. She was the third woman in the history of the ECJ to hold this position. One of the roles of an Advocate General is to provide a legal opinion in regard to a case brought before the Court. In her opinions provided for the cases of pressetext Nachrichtenagentur GmbH v Republic of Austria (2006) and Uniplex (UK) v NHS Business Services Authority (2008), where issues had been raised about limitation periods for challenging public procurement decisions, Kokott put forward a "generally valid" distinction between challenges which called for a contract already concluded to be declared void, and challenges which called for a declaration that a contract had been unlawfully awarded and potentially sought compensation for the wronged tenderer(s). The former category required what she called "primary legal protection" and so a relatively short limitation period should apply, whereas the latter category, subject to "secondary legal protection", could accommodate a longer limitation period as long as the duration of the limitation period was clear.

== Other activities ==
- European Law Students' Association (ELSA) – Germany Chapter, Member of the Advisory Board
- Max Planck Institute for Tax Law and Public Finance, Member of the Board of Trustees
- American Society of International Law (ASIL), Member
- German Women Lawyers Association (DJB), Member

== Personal life ==
Kokott is married and mother to six children.

== Publications ==
- Juliane Kokott: Art. 4, 12a, 16, 17a, 87a, 87b, und 116, in: Sachs (ed.): Grundgesetz Kommentar, 1.-5. Edition, Munich: C.H. Beck 1996, 1999, 2002, 2007, 2008, ISBN 978-3-406-49233-4.
- Juliane Kokott et al.: Grundzüge des Völkerrechts , 3. Edition, Heidelberg: UTB 2003, ISBN 978-3-8252-1511-8.
- Juliane Kokott: Art. 281, 282, 296-299, 301-307, 311-314 EGV, in: Streinz (ed.), EUV/EGV – Vertrag über die Europäische Union und Vertrag zur Gründung der Europäischen Gemeinschaft - Kommentar, Munich: C.H. Beck 2003, ISBN 978-3-406-48457-5.
- Juliane Kokott / Hartmut Graßl et al.: Welt im Wandel: Energiewende zur Nachhaltigkeit - Wissenschaftlicher Beirat der Bundesregierung Globale Umweltveränderungen (WBGU) 2003.
- Juliane Kokott et al.: Grundzüge des Völkerrechts, 1.-3. Edition, Heidelberg: C.F. Müller Verlag 1988, 2000, 2003, ISBN 978-3-8252-1511-8.
- Juliane Kokott: Gleichheitssatz und Diskriminierungsverbote in der Rechtsprechung des Bundesverfassungsgerichts, in: Badura / Dreier (eds.), Festschrift 50 Jahre Bundesverfassungsgericht, Bd. 2: Klärung und Fortbildung des Verfassungsrechts, Tübingen: Mohr Siebeck 2001, pp. 127–162.
- Juliane Kokott: Beweislastverteilung und Prognoseentscheidungen bei der Inanspruchnahme von Grundrechten und internationalen Menschenrechten, Beiträge zum ausländischen öffentlichen Recht und Völkerrecht, Bd. 110, 445 p., Berlin/Heidelberg/New York: Springer Verlag 1993, ISBN 3-540-56762-3.
- Juliane Kokott: Das interamerikanische System zum Schutz der Menschenrechte - The Inter-American System for the Protection of Human Rights, Beiträge zum ausländischen öffentlichen Recht und Völkerrecht, Bd. 92, 166 p., Berlin/Heidelberg/New York: Springer Verlag 1986, ISBN 3-540-17092-8.

== See also ==
- List of members of the European Court of Justice
