= Niilo Jääskinen =

Finnish lawyer

Niilo Jääskinen (born 16 September 1958) is a Finnish lawyer and he served as an Advocate General at the European Court of Justice from October 2009 to October 2015 and as a judge as of October 2019.

== Career ==
In 1990, Jääskinen was appointed as head of the European Law Section of the Ministry of Justice in Finland. In 1995 he was appointed as Advisor and Clerk for European affairs of the Grand Committee of the Finnish Parliament. Between 2000 and 2009 and from October 2015 to October 2019 Jääskinen has served as Judge at the Supreme Administrative Court of Finland.

In 2009, he was appointed Advocate General of the European Court of Justice and in 2019 for the remaining two years of judge Allan Rosas' mandate. In October 2021 he started a new six years mandate.

Jääskinen played a key role in two important cases relating to water. In Case C-525/12, he gave his opinion on the term "water services" in the Water Framework Directive; in Case C-461/13, he gave his opinion on 23 October 2014 on the term "deterioration" in the Water Framework Directive. Both cases are of high relevance for the protection of water. In 2014, he gave his opinion on Google Spain v AEPD and Mario Costeja González.

== See also ==
- List of members of the European Court of Justice
