= Michael Shrimpton =

English barrister

Michael Shrimpton (born 9 March 1957) is an English former barrister and judge who is known for his conspiracy theories and hoaxes. He was convicted in 2014 for falsely reporting that Germany was planning a nuclear attack on the 2012 Summer Olympics.

== Professional career ==
Shrimpton studied at University College, Cardiff (now Cardiff University) and was called to the Bar by Gray's Inn in November 1983. He practised law as a barrister and sat as a part-time immigration judge.

In 1998, Shrimpton chaired the Rolls-Royce Action Committee and Crewe Motors, two failed attempts to buy the British car manufacturer Rolls-Royce Motors from Vickers; the sale was made to Volkswagen.

Shrimpton represented the five defendants in Thoburn v Sunderland City Council, the "Metric Martyrs" case of 2001–2002. The barrister argued that, despite the passage of the European Communities Act 1972, traders were still legally permitted to use imperial units. His argument that the Weights and Measures Act 1985 had implicitly repealed the European Communities Act was ultimately rejected by the court.

In 2002, Shrimpton was the Immigration Appellate Authority adjudicator in what became Chen v Home Secretary, a landmark case in European Union citizenship law. In an unprecedented move, Shrimpton referred the case directly to the European Court of Justice, bypassing the Court of Appeal and the House of Lords. Shrimpton's written decision was lauded as "brave" by British peer and journalist Adrian Berry, and has been credited with ensuring that justice in the Chen case prevailed.

As a result of Shrimpton's child pornography charges (see below), in April 2013 the Bar Standards Board revoked his ability to participate in cases involving children. Following his November 2014 conviction for a nuclear bomb threat hoax, the Board completely suspended him from practice pending conclusion of professional misconduct proceedings. In 2018 the Board concluded that he should be disbarred for the bomb hoax and possession of indecent images.

== Political activities ==
According to Bill Rammell, a contemporary of Shrimpton's at University College, Cardiff, Shrimpton was a member of the Conservative Party when he was elected president of the students' union in 1981. He soon defected to the Social Democratic Party, then a few months later to the Labour Party, and finally joined the Socialist Workers Party by 1982. He contested the 1987 general election in Horsham and the 1989 European Parliament election in Sussex West as a Labour candidate.

After being passed over for the Labour candidacy in the 1997 Uxbridge by-election, Shrimpton defected once again to the Conservative Party and joined the Aylesbury Conservative Association. At the time, he attributed his decision to Labour's becoming too "centralised and overriding the wishes of local constituency activists". Prime Minister Tony Blair characterised Shrimpton's departure as "odd" and Labour spokespersons stated that it was "just a simple case of sour grapes". Years later, Shrimpton said that he left Labour over the issue of European Union membership.

He served as chairman of Watermead Parish Council. In 2002, he was co-chairman of the Bruges Group, of which he was a director from 15 June 2001 to 13 December 2002.

== Conspiracy theories ==
Shrimpton is particularly noted for his claims concerning his role in the intelligence community and for his theories on the infiltration of British society by German spies and saboteurs.

Shrimpton describes himself as a "national security and intelligence specialist". He claims that his address is the headquarters of an international intelligence network and that he has travelled the world on intelligence assignments, with contacts in the CIA, FBI, MI6, Pentagon, Chinese intelligence, and the British Parliament. He credits himself with a role in several intelligence successes, including the capture of Osama bin Laden.

According to Shrimpton, Germany re-established its Nazi-era intelligence apparatus, the Deutsches Verteidigungs Dienst [sic] (DVD) in 1945, and has since used it to wreak economic and political chaos abroad. The DVD is supposedly responsible for the assassinations (often via "weaponized cancer") of Hugh Gaitskell, Ross McWhirter, Airey Neave, Ian Gow, John Smith, James Goldsmith, Christopher Story, Anna Lindh, Jo Cox, Mohandas Gandhi, and John F. Kennedy, as well as for the sinking of the Russian submarine Kursk and for the Japanese tsunami of 2011. Shrimpton further claims that German spies have infiltrated MI5, MI6, and GCHQ and have controlled Al-Qaeda, Osama bin Laden, and the British prime ministers Clement Attlee, Harold Macmillan, Harold Wilson, and Edward Heath. Many of these claims are laid out in his book Spyhunter, published in 2014 by June Press, and in his articles for Veterans Today.

Shrimpton has also written or campaigned on issues and theories relating to Euroscepticism, organized paedophilia, global warming, Malaysian Airlines Flight MH370, Barack Obama's parentage and citizenship, the disputed status of Gibraltar, and coproxamol and its role in the death of David Kelly.

Police and court officials and the mainstream press have generally rejected Shrimpton's claims as grandiose conspiracy theories that he uses to bolster his reputation and to ingratiate himself to those with real power. He is known to police forces across the United Kingdom as an "intelligence nuisance". Shrimpton denies that he is mentally ill or a compulsive liar, and a psychiatric evaluation at his 2014 bomb hoax trial showed no criminally relevant evidence of mental illness. His defence counsel nonetheless suspected him to be suffering from a developmental or personality disorder such as autism or narcissistic personality disorder.

=== Madeleine McCann ===
The unsolved disappearance of toddler Madeleine McCann was a particular interest of Shrimpton's. He referred to himself as the "unofficial representative" for parents Kate and Gerry McCann, and claimed responsibility for setting up a meeting between them and Pope Benedict XVI. According to Shrimpton, he made arrangements for the British Armed Forces to rescue Madeleine, who was being held in or near Morocco after being smuggled there from Lagos on a drug-running vessel. Shrimpton further claimed that the government had invested him with the authority to issue Defence Advisory Notices, and that he once invoked this in the McCann case against the News of the World. Buckingham Palace and Leicestershire Police officials confirmed receipt of correspondence from Shrimpton, but denied that he was responsible for arranging the papal visit. The report of Madeleine's captivity in Morocco was also rejected as false, and authorities issued a strict warning to Shrimpton not to interfere with the case.

=== 2012 Summer Olympics bomb hoax ===
On 19 April 2012, Shrimpton contacted Barry Burton, the Principal Private Secretary (an official of the Ministry of Defence) of Defence Secretary Philip Hammond, to warn of an impending attack against London. According to Shrimpton, the DVD — the Deutsches Verteidigungs Dienst, translated as the "German Defence Service", a fictional, secret Nazi-era intelligence agency invented and promoted by Shrimpton — had stolen a nuclear warhead from the Kursk and planted it somewhere in London. The agency was supposedly planning to detonate the warhead during the opening ceremony of the 2012 Summer Olympics, with the principal target being either the Olympic Stadium or Queen Elizabeth II. Shrimpton said the source of this information was the Russian Main Intelligence Directorate, via a back-channel network that included a friend of Pope Benedict XVI. The following day, Shrimpton repeatedly called the office of MP David Lidington to make the same warning.

Hammond and Lidington referred the reports to the Olympic Security Team. Though officials knew Shrimpton to be unreliable and were suspicious of his claims, they were obligated to take the reports seriously. When they were confirmed to be hoaxes, Shrimpton was arrested at his home in Wendover on 20 April on charges of communicating false information with intent. During police questioning, he said his arrest was a "colossal cock-up" and demanded "compensation and a nice lunch with MI5". He later claimed that his arrest had been engineered by DVD infiltrators in the Thames Valley Police, and had allowed the DVD time to remove the nuclear device. On 23 April, Shrimpton wrote to Buckingham Palace, the Ministry of Defence, the Kremlin, and the NSA to inform them that the Queen was no longer under threat, but that the bomb may have been moved to Ground Zero in New York City.

The case went to trial at Southwark Crown Court in November 2014, with Shrimpton representing himself. Shrimpton admitted to the court that his claims sounded "strange, 'highfalutin', incredible and fantastic" but denied making positive statements about the bomb threat. The prosecution said instead that Shrimpton "passed extraordinary and dramatic information about a threatened nuclear attack" as "a mechanism to gild his self-constructed reputation as an intelligence expert" but with "the potential to cause enormous disruption, diversion of scarce resources, and wasted public money." At one point during the trial, Judge Alistair McCreath reprimanded Shrimpton for using witnesses to advance his conspiracy theories. On 25 November, the jury convicted him by an 11–1 majority on two counts of communicating false information. In February 2015 he was sentenced to a twelve-month term of imprisonment.

While investigating the bomb hoax case, police discovered Shrimpton to be in possession of a memory stick containing forty indecent images of children. This resulted in another criminal case, with Shrimpton being convicted and sentenced to a three-year supervision order and a five-year sexual offences prevention order. He was also required to sign the Violent and Sex Offender Register. Shrimpton unsuccessfully appealed against the conviction, claiming that local police or the intelligence services had planted the pornographic images in his home in order to discredit him.
