= Pedro Cruz Villalón =

Spanish jurist

Pedro Cruz Villalón (born 25 May 1946) is a Spanish jurist who served as an Advocate General at the European Court of Justice. He was chief justice of the Constitutional Court of Spain (1998–2001). Cruz Villalón was awarded Hijo Predilecto de Andalucía in 2001.

== See also ==
- List of members of the European Court of Justice
