= Stig von Bahr =

Swedish judge (born 1939)

Stig von Bahr (born 26 June 1939) is a Swedish jurist and former judge at the European Court of Justice.

Stig von Bahr has worked with the Justitieombudsman (Parliamentary Ombudsman) and in the Swedish Cabinet Office and the Ministries inter alia as assistant under-secretary in the Ministry of Finance. He was appointed Judge in the Administrative Court of Appeal (kammarrätt) of Gothenburg in 1981 and Justice of the Supreme Administrative Court (Regeringsrätten) in 1985. He has collaborated on a large number of official reports, mainly on the subject of tax legislation and accounting. He has been inter alia chairman of the Committee on Inflation-Adjusted Taxation of Income, chairman of the accounting committee and special rapporteur for the Committee on Rules for Taxation of Private Company Owners. He has also been chairman of the Accounting Standards Board and member of the board of the National Courts Administration as well as of the board of the Financial Supervisory Authority. He has published a large number of articles, mainly on the subject of tax legislation. Stig von Bahr was appointed judge of the European Court of Justice on 7 October 2000.

== See also ==
- List of members of the European Court of Justice
