= Endre Juhász =

Hungarian jurist (born 1944)

Endre Juhász (born 1944) is a Hungarian jurist who has served as a judge of the European Court of Justice from 2004 to 2021.

== Career ==
Juhász began his professional career working in the Department of the Ministry of Foreign Trade in 1966, becoming Director for Legislative Matters in 1973. He then moved to Brussels to take the position of First Commercial Secretary at the Hungarian Embassy, Brussels, responsible for European Community issue until 1979.

Juhász later became the Ambassador and Chief of Mission of the Republic of Hungary to the European Union from 1995 until May 2003.

In May 2004, he later left the Hungarian Government to take a position as a judge of the European Court of Justice where he served until October 2021.

== Education ==
Juhász studied law at the University of Szeged in Hungary, graduating in 1967. He continued his studies in comparative law at the University of Strasbourg from 1969 to 1972.

== See also ==
- List of members of the European Court of Justice
