= Rosario Silva de Lapuerta =

Spanish judge at the European Court of Justice (born 1954)

- Born: 15 June 1954 (age 72); Madrid, Spain
- Education: Complutense University of Madrid
- Occupations: Lawyer, judge at the European Court of Justice (2003–2021)
- Title: Vice-president of the European Court of Justice
- Term: 9 October 2018 – 7 October 2021
- Predecessor: Antonio Tizzano
- Successor: Lars Bay Larsen

Rosario Silva de Lapuerta (born 15 June 1954 in Madrid) is a Spanish jurist who served as a judge at the European Court of Justice (CJEU) between 7 October 2003 and 7 October 2021 and since 9 October 2018 as a Vice-President of the CJEU.

== Early years and education ==
Silva de Lapuerta was born in Madrid on 15 June 1954. Her father was the Francoist minister Federico Silva Muñoz and she is also the older sister of Marta Silva Lapuerta, Solicitor General from 2012 to 2016. She attained a Bachelor/Master of Laws at the Complutense University of Madrid.

== Career ==
=== Career in Spain ===
On July 11, 1978 – five months before the Constitution of Spain was approved – Silva de Lapuerta was the first woman to enter in State Lawyers Corps in Spain. In 1978, she succeeded in her admission to the body of public prosecutors by civil service examination, becoming Abogado del Estado in Málaga; then at the Legal Service of the Ministry of Transport, Tourism and Communication and, subsequently, at the Legal Service of the Ministry of Foreign Affairs.

Silva de Lapuerta became Head Abogado del Estado of the State Legal Service for Cases before the Court of Justice of the European Communities and Deputy Director-General of the Community and International Legal Assistance Department at the Ministry of Justice; a member of the Commission think tank on the future of the Community judicial system; the Head of the Spanish delegation in the ‘Friends of the Presidency' Group with regard to the reform of the Community judicial system in the Treaty of Nice and of the Council of the European Union ad hoc working party on the European Court of Justice.

=== European Court of Justice ===
Silva de Lapuerta has been a judge at the European Court of Justice since 7 October 2003. In 2014, her term was renewed until 6 October 2021. She has been serving as the court's Vice President since 9 October 2018, alongside President Koen Lenaerts.

During her time at the CJEU, Silva de Lapuerta notably signed a 2018 ruling that said Ireland had the right to refuse to hand over an alleged drug dealer to Poland if its judiciary determined that the accused would not receive a fair trial there. She also authored a later decision ordering Poland to “immediately” suspend changes to the country's Supreme Court and reinstate judges dismissed in what was widely seen as a purge of the country's judiciary. In a 2021 preliminary injunction, Silva de Lapuerata ordered Poland to cease extraction activities at the Turów Coal Mine near the Czech and German borders for the duration of a lawsuit filed by the Czech Republic challenging the mine's permit. She ended her term at the CJEU on 7 October 2021.

In addition to her work as judge, Silva de Lapuerta is also professor of community law at the Diplomatic School in Madrid and co-director of the journal Noticias de la Unión Europea.

== Distinctions ==
In 2003, Silva de Lapuerta was awarded the Grand Cross of the Order of Civil Merit. She was also awarded the Grand Cross of Saint Raymond of Peñafort on December 15, 2020.

== See also ==
- List of members of the European Court of Justice
