= Maria Berger =

Austrian politician

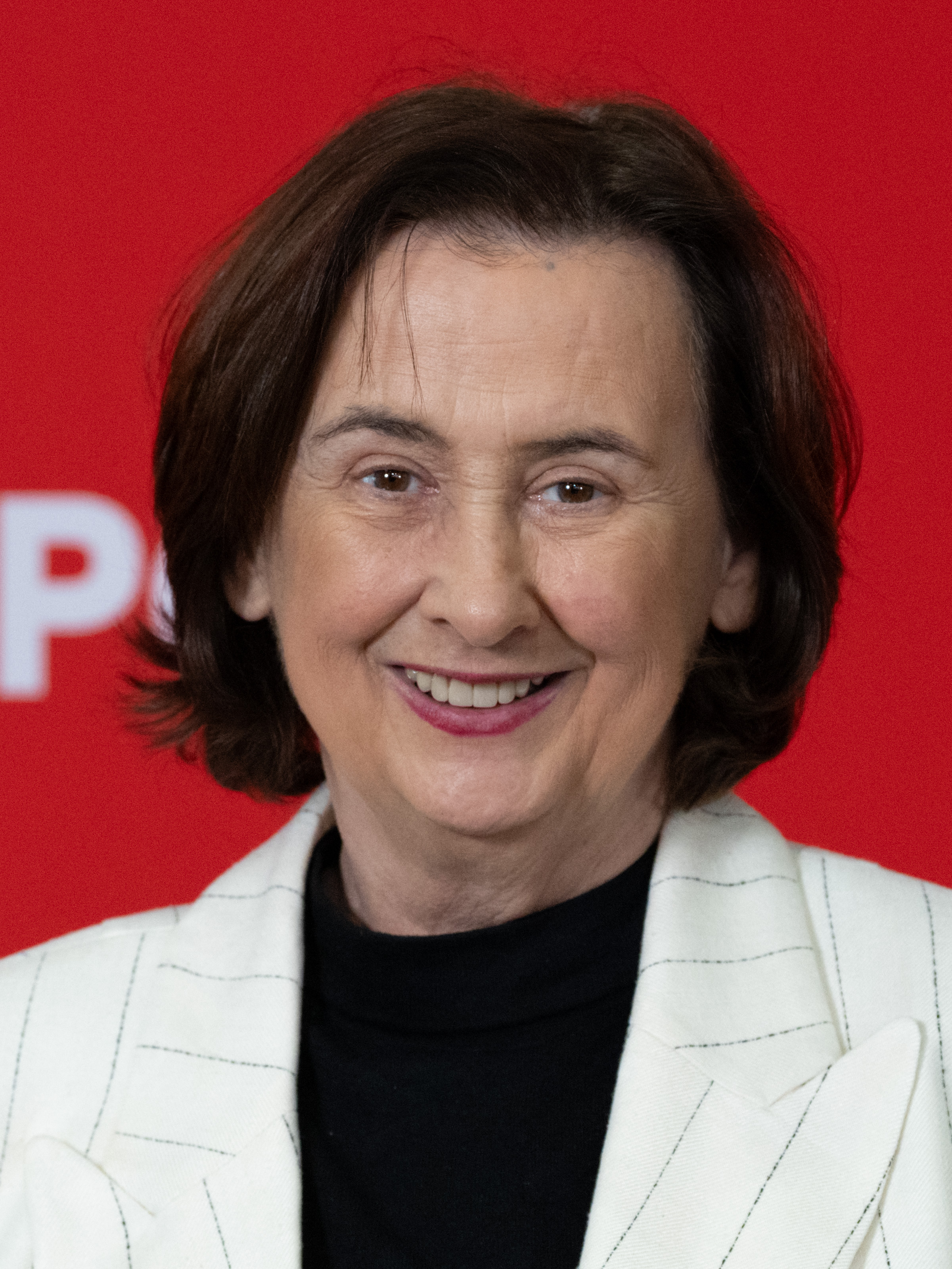

Judge of the Court of Justice of the European Communities
- Incumbent
- Assumed office 7 October 2009

Member of the European Parliament for Austria
- In office 11 December 2008 – 13 July 2009
- In office 11 November 1996 – 10 January 2007

Justice Minister of Austria
- In office 11 January 2007 – 2 December 2008
- Chancellor: Alfred Gusenbauer
- Preceded by: Karin Gastinger
- Succeeded by: Johannes Hahn

Personal details
- Born: 19 August 1956 (age 69) Perg, Upper Austria
- Party: SPÖ
- Profession: civil servant, politician

Maria Berger (born 19 August 1956 in Perg, Upper Austria) is an Austrian politician and currently Judge at the European Court of Justice. She previously served as a Member of the European Parliament and Austria's Minister of Justice.

== Education ==
- Doctor of Law, Innsbruck University (1979)

== Early career ==
- University assistant (1979–1984)
- Official at the Federal Ministry of Science and Research (1984–1988)
- Head of the European Integration Department of the Federal Chancellor's Office (1989–1993)
- Directorship post in the EFTA Surveillance Authority in Brussels (1993–1994)
- Vice-President of the University of Krems (1995–1996)
- Federal Chairman of the Young Generation in the SPÖ (1984–1987)
- Member of the Land party committee of the SPÖ in Upper Austria (since 2004)

== Political career ==
Berger was a Member of the European Parliament since 1996, interrupted by her tenure as Austrian Justice Minister (2007 – 2008). She was also the leader of the Social Democratic Party delegation which is part of the Party of European Socialists, and served on the European Parliament's Committee on Legal Affairs. On the committee, she served as her parliamentary group’s coordinator. In addition, she later also was a member of the Committee on the Environment, Public Health and Food Safety and the parliament’s delegation to the ACP–EU Joint Parliamentary Assembly.

Berger was also a substitute for the Committee on Constitutional Affairs, a member of the delegation for relations with the countries of South Asia and the South Asian Association for Regional Cooperation, and a substitute for the delegation for relations with Canada.

In January 2007 Berger was appointed as Justice Minister in the government of Alfred Gusenbauer as Chancellor of Austria. After leaving office in December 2008 she returned to serve in the European Parliament till July 2009. Since October 2009 she is a member of the European Court of Justice.

== Recognition ==
- Honorary medal of the International Mauthausen Committee, National Order of the Republic of Lithuania

== See also ==
- List of members of the European Court of Justice

Political offices
Preceded by Karin Gastinger	Justice Minister of Austria; 2007 – 2008	Succeeded by Johannes Hahn
