= Fidelma Macken =

Irish judge (born 1942)

Fidelma Macken SC

Judge of the Supreme Court
- In office 23 June 2005 – 28 February 2012
- Nominated by: Government of Ireland
- Appointed by: Mary McAleese

Judge of the High Court
- In office 19 October 2004 – 23 June 2005
- Nominated by: Government of Ireland
- Appointed by: Mary McAleese
- In office 9 December 1998 – 6 October 1999
- Nominated by: Government of Ireland
- Appointed by: Mary McAleese

Judge of the European Court of Justice
- In office 6 October 1999 – 13 October 2004
- Nominated by: Government of Ireland
- Appointed by: European Council

Personal details
- Born: Fidelma O'Kelly; 28 February 1942 (age 84) Dublin, Ireland
- Children: 1
- Education: Trinity College Dublin; King's Inns

Fidelma Macken, SC (née O'Kelly; born 28 February 1942) is a retired Irish judge who served as a Judge of the Supreme Court from 2005 to 2012, a Judge of the High Court from 1998 to 1999 and between 2004 and 2005 and a Judge of the European Court of Justice from 1999 to 2004.

In 2004, she succeeded John L. Murray, as Ireland's appointee on the European Court of Justice (ECJ). Appointed initially for a five-year term, she was the first female appointee to the European Court of Justice but had her mandate renewed in 2003. She was reappointed a High Court judge on 18 October 2004 on her return to Ireland. In 2005, she was elevated the Supreme Court.

Macken was educated at King's Inns and Trinity College Dublin. She became a barrister in 1972; practiced as legal adviser, Patents and Trade Marks Agents (1973–1979) and became a Senior Counsel in 1995.

As a lawyer, she specialised on medical defence work and pharmaceutical actions. She acted as defence counsel in a series of cases brought by children against whooping cough vaccine manufacturers for damage allegedly caused by the vaccine. The Supreme Court nominated her to act in three referrals by the President of Ireland querying the constitutionality of new legislation before she became a judge. In 2001, the Irish Times reported that she was an owner of the Four Seasons Hotel in Ballsbridge

She has been a lecturer in Legal Systems and Methods and Averil Deverell Lecturer in Law at Trinity College Dublin.

Macken returned to practice at Brick Court Chambers in 2013. She is a member of the Investment Advisory Panel of Woodsford Litigation Funding, a company engaged in litigation funding.

== See also ==
- List of members of the European Court of Justice
