= Peter Jann =

Austrian jurist

Peter Jann (born 1935) is an Austrian jurist and was a judge at the European Court of Justice from 19 January 1995 until 7 October 2009.

== See also ==
- List of members of the European Court of Justice
