= Alexander Arabadjiev =

Bulgarian lawyer and judge (born 1949)

Alexander Arabadjiev (Bulgarian: Александър Арабаджиев) (born 1949) is a Bulgarian lawyer and is a judge at the Court of Justice of the European Union.

He graduated with legal studies (St Kliment Ohridski University, Sofia); Judge at the District Court, Blagoevgrad (1975–83); Judge at the Regional Court, Blagoevgrad (1983–86); Judge at the Supreme Court (1986–91); Judge at the Constitutional Court (1991-2000); member of the European Commission of Human Rights (1997–99); member of the European Convention on the Future of Europe (2002–03); member of the National Assembly (2001–06); Observer at the European Parliament; Judge at the Court of Justice since 12 January 2007.

== See also ==
- List of members of the European Court of Justice
