= Vassilios Skouris =

Greek judge

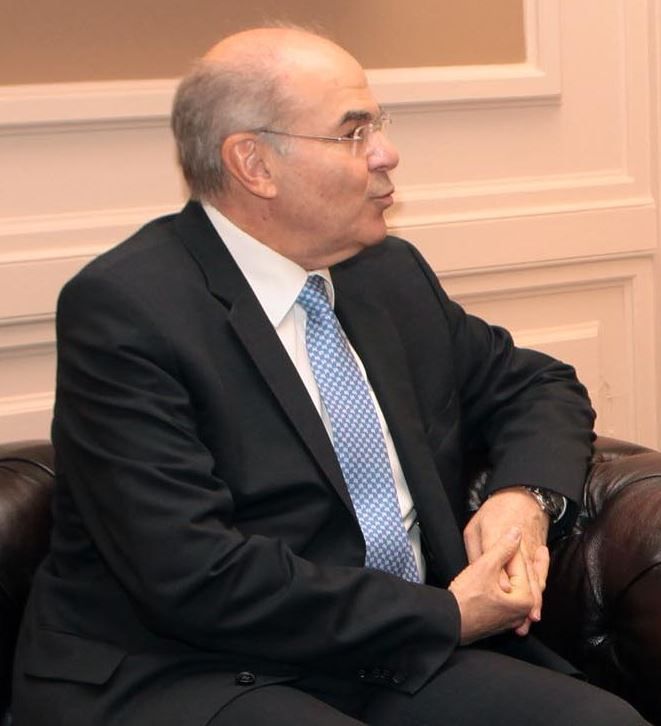
- Vassilios Skouris, 2013

Minister of State
- In office 26 May 2023 – 26 June 2023
- Prime Minister: Ioannis Sarmas

President of the Court of Justice of the European Union
- In office 7 October 2003 – 6 October 2015
- Preceded by: Gil Carlos Rodríguez Iglesias
- Succeeded by: Koen Lenaerts

Minister of the Interior
- In office 30 August 1996 – 25 September 1996
- Prime Minister: Costas Simitis
- Preceded by: Akis Tsochatzopoulos
- Succeeded by: Alekos Papadopoulos
- In office 12 October 1989 – 23 November 1989
- Prime Minister: Yannis Grivas
- Preceded by: Nikos Konstantopoulos
- Succeeded by: Theodoros Katrivanos

Personal details
- Born: 6 March 1948 (age 78) Thessaloniki, Greece
- Education: Free University of Berlin; University of Hamburg

Vassilios Skouris (Greek: Βασίλειος Σκουρής; born 6 March 1948) is a Greek judge who was President of the European Court of Justice from 2003 to 2015. A European legal scholar, he served briefly in the government of Greece as Minister of the Interior in 1989 and again in 1996. He is professor at the Law School of the Aristotle University and at Bucerius Law School in Hamburg, Germany.

== Early years and education ==
Skouris was born on 6 March 1948 in Thessaloniki, then part of the Kingdom of Greece.

He graduated with a degree in law from the Free University of Berlin in 1970, and was subsequently awarded doctorate in constitutional and administrative law at the University of Hamburg in 1973. In 1978 he was a professor of Public Law at Bielefeld University and in 1982 a professor of Public Law at the University of Thessaloniki. During the period of 1972 to 1977 he was lecturing law at the University of Hamburg.

== Greek Minister of the Interior ==
Following the dissolution of the Greek parliament in 1989, Skouris served as the Minister of the Interior briefly during the caretaker government. He served another short stint in 1996.

== Notable positions ==
Skouris was the President of the Greek Association for European Law between 1992 and 1994, Director of the Centre for International and European Economic Law in 1997, and President of the Greek Economic and Social Council in 1998. He has also served as a Member of the Scientific Committee of the Greek Ministry of Foreign Affairs between 1997 and 1999, Administrative Board of the Greek National Judges' College between 1995 and 1996, Greek National Research Committee between 1993 and 1995, Higher Selection Board for Greek Civil Servants between 1994 and 1996, and the Academic Council of the Academy of European Law in 1995. He was a member of the Board of Guardians of the Academy of European Law of Trier.

Since 10 May 2017, he has been the second chairman of the Adjudicatory Chamber of the FIFA Ethics Committee, succeeding the German Hans-Joachim Eckert.

== European Court of Justice ==
On 8 June 1999, the member states of the European Union agreed to the appointment of Skouris to the Court of Justice of the European Communities, or European Court of Justice. Following his first term, the justices of the court elected him as their President on 7 October 2003, and again on 7 October 2009. Koen Lenaerts, who had been Vice-President since 2012, succeeded him as President on 8 October 2015.

=== Landmark rulings ===
President Skouris has presided over several landmark rulings since joining the court, including B.F. Cadman v. Health & Safety Executive (C-17/05), decided in 2006, which held that pay scales based on seniority were not gender discrimination, unless it could be proved otherwise that seniority was not the discriminatory factor. Other notable cases include Brian Francis Collins v. Secretary of State for Work and Pensions (C-138/02), decided in 2004, which struck down a discriminatory employment benefits law in the United Kingdom, allowing access to benefits for those of an EU nationality, and Commission of the European Communities v. Federal Republic of Germany C-112/05 which struck down the "Volkswagen Law", against the wishes of the German government and labor unions. In "The Viking Case", International Transport Workers' Federation, Finnish Seamen's Union v. Viking Line ABP, OÜ Viking Line Eesti (C-438/05), decided in 2007, it was determined that an employer who seeks cost-effective labor in a member state cannot have business freedom privileges infringed by trade unions unless the aim of the union is to protect workers in accordance with the public interest.

Another notable case includes Coleman v Attridge Law, in which the court ruled that a mother whose job was terminated for requesting specific hours because of having to care for a disabled child was entitled to protection from disability discrimination. It struck down a United Kingdom law that only permitted protection for the actual individual who was disabled. As a significant result of the ECJ intervention, associative discrimination became a part of the UK Equality Act 2010.

=== Controversies ===
In 2009, the court rendered a landmark decision in Apostolides v Orams, which forced the owner of a vacation villa from the United Kingdom to vacate their property rights for victims of the Turkish invasion of Cyprus in 1974, who had fled and lost their land. The neutrality of President Skouris was questioned because of his acceptance of the Grand Collar of the Order of Makarios III of the Republic of Cyprus in 2006 and visits with the leadership of the southern portion of the island, where many refugees remain, months before the ruling.

== Speeches and views ==
In a speech in 2004, President Skouris indicated he believed that the Court of Justice served as a supreme court instead of just a constitutional court.

In a speech in 2006 at the European Conference on Subsidiarity, he described the role of the subsidiarity principle with the court, linking it to Quadragesimo anno. He stated "what individuals can do on their own initiative and out of their own efforts, should not be taken away from them and allocated to the community, for it would be against justice for the larger entities to assume what the small entities can achieve and bring to a positive end... Subsidiarity protects small communities against being deprived of tasks by a central power to a greater extent as necessary.” He also discussed proportionality, which he says "protects individuals against a restriction to an unnecessary extent of their rights by a measure benefiting the community."

In 2007, he visited the Southern Methodist University's Dedman School of Law in Dallas, along with justices from the United States Supreme Court, and attended events at the Dallas Bar Association and the Dallas Committee on Foreign Relations, while delivering a speech on the role of the Court of Justice in the EU to the pro-business Greater Dallas Chamber of Commerce.

At the 50th anniversary celebration for the court in 2009, President Skouris spoke about the court's earlier years of abstaining from issues of individual fundamental rights within each country but, with the new Charter of Fundamental Rights, expressed a desire, in accordance with such, to improve the rights of citizens within member nations.

== Honours and awards ==
He has Honorable distinctions by the Greek, Italian, Cypriot, Romanian, Austrian, and French governments. He has a Rank of Commander in National Order of the Legion of Honor of the French Republic. He is a Corresponding member of Ακαδημία Αθηνών (Academy of Athens). He is an honorary doctorate of: the Administrative College of Speyer (Germany), the University of Vilnius (Lithuania), the Democritus University of Thrace, the University of Münster (Germany), the University of Athens and the University of Bucarest, University Paris 2 Panthéon-Assas, the University of Masaryk (Brno), Panteion University (Athens) and Heidelberg University.

== See also ==
- List of members of the European Court of Justice

Political offices
Preceded by Nikos Konstantopoulos	Minister of the Interior; 1989	Succeeded by Theodoros Katrivanos
Preceded by Akis Tsochatzopoulos	Minister of the Interior, Public Administration and Decentralisation; 1996	Succeeded by Alekos Papadopoulos
Legal offices
Preceded by Gil Carlos Rodríguez Iglesias	President of the European Court of Justice; 2003–2015	Succeeded by Koen Lenaerts
