= Egidijus Jarašiūnas =

Lithuanian politician

Egidijus Jarašiūnas (born 9 October 1952 in Kelmė district municipality) is a Lithuanian lawyer, signatory of the Act of the Re-Establishment of the State of Lithuania. He was a judge of the Constitutional Court of Lithuania from 1996 to 2005. Since 2007 he is a dean of Faculty of Law at Mykolas Romeris University.

== See also ==
- List of members of the European Court of Justice
