= José Narciso da Cunha Rodrigues =

Portuguese jurist and judge

José Narciso da Cunha Rodrigues (born 1940) is a Portuguese jurist and former judge at the European Court of Justice.

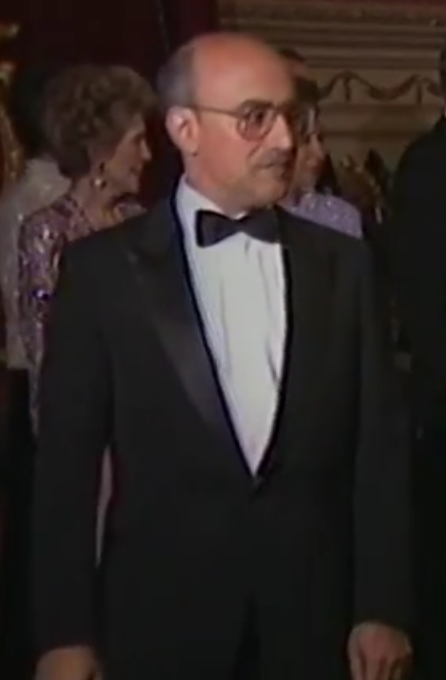
Cunha Rodrigues

He held various offices within the judiciary between 1964 & 1977, including Government assignments to carry out and coordinate studies on reform of the judicial system. He has also held the following positions since then:

- Government Agent at the European Commission of Human Rights and the European Court of Human Rights (1980–84).
- Expert on the Human Rights Steering Committee of the Council of Europe (1980–85).
- Member of the Review Commission for the Criminal Code and the Code of Criminal Procedure.
- Principal State Counsel (1984–2000).
- Member of the Supervisory Committee of the European Union Anti-Fraud Office (OLAF) (1999–2000).
- Judge at the Court of Justice from 7 October 2000 to 8 October 2012.

== See also ==
- List of members of the European Court of Justice
