= Christopher Vajda =

British jurist

Sir Christopher Vajda KC

Judge of the European Court of Justice
- In office 8 October 2012 – 31 January 2020

Personal details
- Born: Christopher Stephen Vajda; 6 July 1955 (age 71) United Kingdom
- Education: Corpus Christi College, Cambridge

Sir Christopher Stephen Vajda KC (born on 6 July 1955) is a British jurist who had formerly served as the Judge of the European Court of Justice from 2012 to 2020.

== Biography ==
Vajda was born on 6 July 1955 in the United Kingdom. He was educated at Winchester College and, from 1974 to 1977, attended Corpus Christi College, Cambridge, receiving a bachelor's degree in law. From 1977 to 1978, he attended the Université libre de Bruxelles for a postgraduate degree Wiener Ansbach scholarship, and graduated with special license.

In 1979, was called to the Bar of England and Wales, and Northern Ireland in 1996. In 1981, he joined as the member of Monckton Chambers. In 1997, Vajda was appointed Queen's Counsel. In 2001, he was appointed treasurer the United Kingdom Association for European Law. On 8 October 2012, Vajda was appointed a judge for the European Court of Justice.

Vajda has left the court following the United Kingdom's withdrawal from the European Union on 31 January 2020. He had been an arbitrator in an ICC arbitration. Vajda is fluent in French and can speak German.
