= Marko Ilešič =

Slovene jurist (1947–2024)

Marko Ilešič (1947 – 20 June 2024) was a Slovene jurist who acted as a judge at the European Court of Justice since 2004. He also served as a Vice-Dean and Dean at the Faculty of Law at the University of Ljubljana, and president of the Football Association of Yugoslavia, and later a Board of Appeal Member of UEFA and FIFA. Ilešič died on 20 June 2024, at the age of 76.
