= Koen Lenaerts =

Belgian jurist and professor

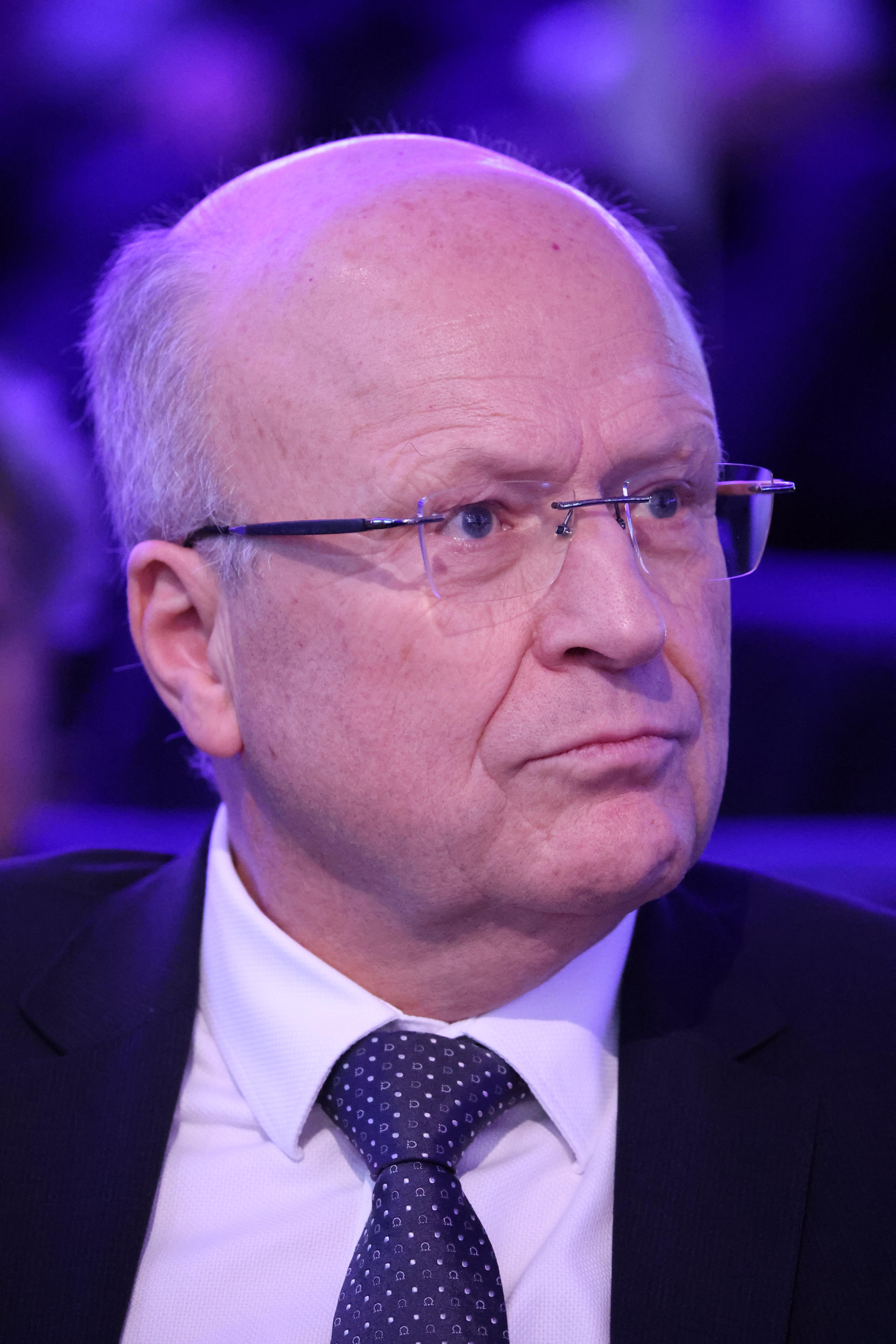
- Koen Lenaerts in 2024

President of the Court of Justice of the European Union
- Incumbent
- Assumed office 8 October 2015
- Preceded by: Vassilios Skouris

Vice President of the Court of Justice of the European Union
- In office 9 October 2012 – 6 October 2015
- Preceded by: Position established
- Succeeded by: Antonio Tizzano

Personal details
- Born: 20 December 1954 (age 71) Mortsel, Belgium
- Education: Université de Namur; Katholieke Universiteit Leuven; Harvard University

Koenraad Lenaerts, Baron Lenaerts (Dutch: [kun ˈleːnaːrts]; born 20 December 1954) is a Belgian jurist and the president of the Court of Justice of the European Union. He is also a Professor of European Law at the Katholieke Universiteit Leuven and was a member of the Coudenberg group, a Belgian federalist think tank.

== Education ==
Lenaerts obtained a candidate in law (summa cum laude) in 1974 at the Université de Namur. In 1977, he graduated with a licentiate in law at the Katholieke Universiteit Leuven (summa cum laude). He then went on to earn a Master of Laws (LLM) degree at Harvard Law School in 1978, with a Belgian Fulbright scholarship, and a Master in Public Administration (MPA) from the John F. Kennedy School of Government at Harvard University in 1979. In 1982, he obtained a PhD in law at the Katholieke Universiteit Leuven.

== Career ==
Since 1983, Lenaerts has been Professor of European Law at the Katholieke Universiteit Leuven, since 1990 with the title of buitengewoon hoogleraar. He is the director of the Institute of European Law at the university. From 1984 until 1989, he was a Professor at the College of Europe in Bruges. From 1984 until 1985, he was a Law clerk to Judge René Joliet at the Court of Justice of the European Communities. From 1986 until 1989, he was a Member of the Brussels Bar acting as an attorney in the European Court of Justice, on behalf of the Belgian state. He was made an Honorary Master of the Bench of the Inner Temple, London, in 2010.

From 1989 until 6 October 2003, Lenearts served as Judge of the European Court of First Instance (now known as the General Court).

Since 7 October 2003, Lenaerts has been a Judge at the European Court of Justice, where he became Vice President in 2012. In October 2015 he became President of the Court of Justice of the European Union and was reelected in this position both in 2018 and 2021. As president, Lenaerts allocates incoming cases to judges and presides over the grand chamber of 15 judges that deals with the most important cases. He is also the public face of the institution.

== Other activities ==
- Academy of European Law (ERA), Ex-Officio Member of the Governing Board
- Max Planck Institute for Comparative Public Law and International Law, Member of the Board of Trustees
- Centre for Governance and Law in Europe at the UCL Faculty of Laws, Member of the Advisory Board
- Columbia Journal of European Law, Member of the Board of Advisors
- European Constitutional Law Review, Member of the Board of Advisors

== Recognition ==
In 2004 Lenaerts was ennobled a baron by King Albert II, King of the Belgians.

== Bibliography ==
- Koen Lenaerts (co-Author), Piet Van Nuffel (co-Author), Constitutional Law of the European Union, Thomson

== See also ==
- List of members of the European Court of Justice

Legal offices
Preceded by Vassilios Skouris	President of the Court of Justice of the European Union; 2015–present	Incumbent
