= Antonio Tizzano =

Italian judge

Antonio Tizzano (born 1940) is a former judge at the European Court of Justice. He served as its Vice-President from October 2015 until October 2018.

He was the Advocate General at the European Court of Justice from 7 October 2000 to 3 May 2006; he had been a Judge at the European Court of Justice since 4 May 2006. He is a professor of European Union Law at La Sapienza University, Rome, and a member of the independent group of experts appointed to examine the finances of the Commission of the European Communities (1999).

On 8 October 2015 he was elected vice-president of the European Court of Justice.

== See also ==
- List of members of the European Court of Justice
