= Allan Rosas =

Finnish jurist (born 1948)

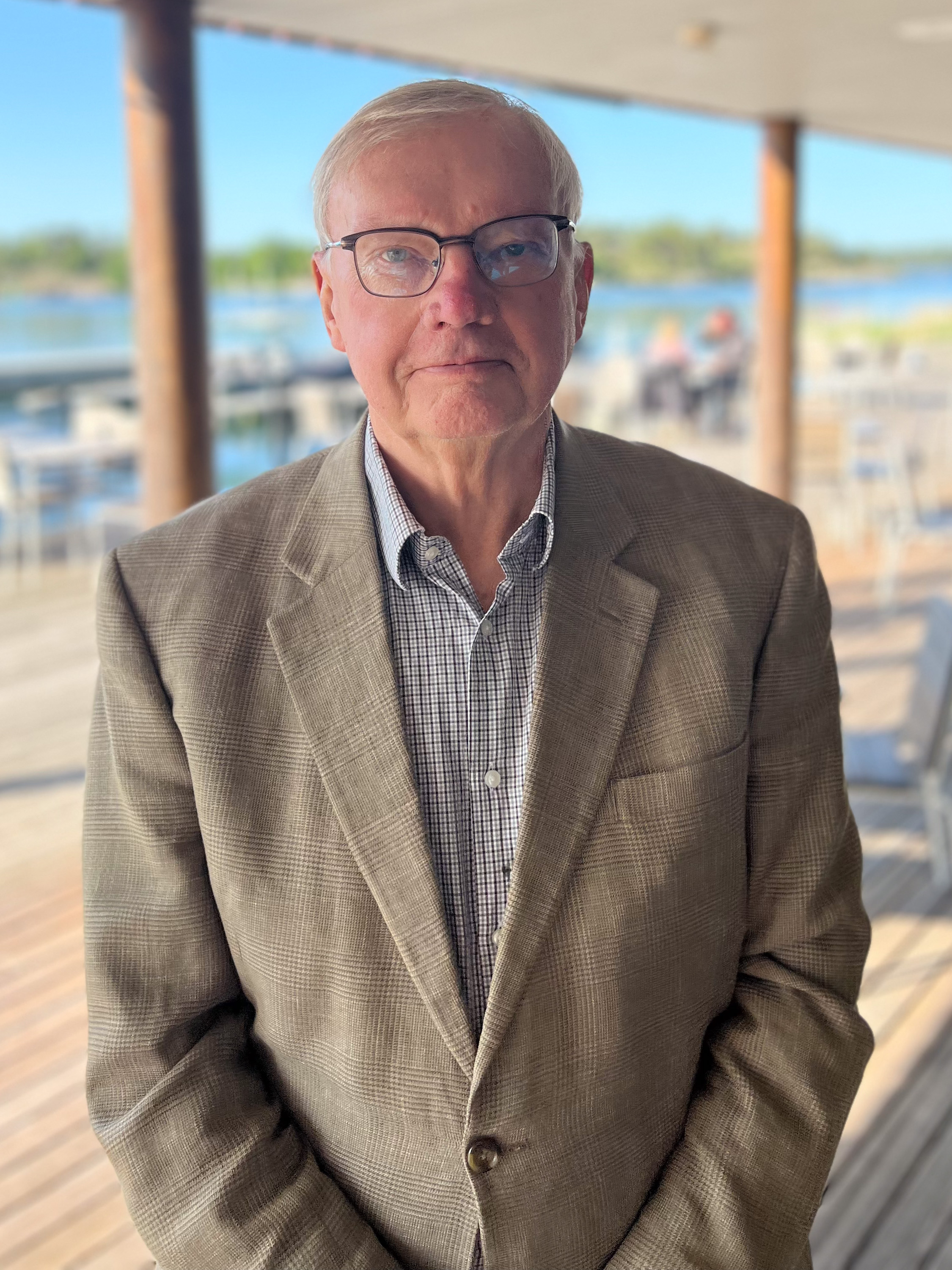

judge of the European Court of Justice
- In office 2002–2019

Director of the Institute for Human Rights
- In office 1985–1995

Personal details
- Born: 1948 (age 77–78)
- Education: University of Turku

Allan Viktor Johnsson Rosas (born 1948) is a Finnish jurist who served as a judge of the European Court of Justice from 2002 until 2019.

== Career ==
Rosas is Doctor of Laws (1977) of the University of Turku (Finland); and he was professor of Law at the University of Turku (1978–1981) and at the Åbo Akademi University in Turku (1981–1996), also Director of the latter's Institute for Human Rights (1985–1995). He has held various international and national academic positions of responsibility and memberships of learned societies, and coordinated several international and national research projects and programmes, including in the fields of EU law, international law, humanitarian and human rights law, constitutional law and comparative public administration.

Rosas has represented the Finnish Government as member of, or adviser to, Finnish delegations at various international conferences and meetings; expert functions in relation to Finnish legal life, including in governmental law commissions and committees of the Finnish Parliament, as well as the UN, UNESCO, Organization for Security and Co-operation in Europe (CSCE) and the Council of Europe. From 1995 he has been Principal Legal Adviser at the Legal Service of the European Commission, in charge of external relations; and from March 2001, Deputy Director-General of the European Commission Legal Service.

In 2019, Rosas was appointed to the European Commission's Independent Ethical Committee.

Principal publications by Rosas include: The Legal Status of Prisoners of War (1976, reprint 2005 by Institute for Human Rights, Åbo Akademi University, Turku); Förvaltningsklagan [Citizens' Complaints] (Turku, Acta Academiae Aboensis, Ser. A:59, 1980); Economic, Social and Cultural Rights: A Textbook (ed. together with Asbjorn Eide and Catarina Crause; 2nd rev. ed., Dordrecht, Martinus Nijhoff Publishers, 2001).

== Publications ==
- The Court of Justice and the Construction of Europe: Analyses and Perspectives on Sixty Years of Case-Law (edited by Allan Rosas, Egil Levits and Yves Bot. The Hague: Asser Press, 2013.)
- Constitutionalising the EU Judicial System: Essays in Honour of Pernilla Lindh. (Edited by Pascal Cardonnel, Allan Rosas and Nils Wahl. Hart Publishing, Oxford and Portland, Oregon, 2012.)
- EU Constitutional Law: An Introduction. (Allan Rosas and Lorna Armati. Hart Publishing, Oxford and Portland, Oregon, 2010. Second, revised edition 2012.)
- EU Competition Law in Context: Essays in Honour of Virpi Tiili. (Edited by Heikki Kanninen, Nina Korjus and Allan Rosas. Hart Publishing, Oxford and Portland, Oregon, 2009.)
- The Legal Status of Prisoners of War: A Study in International Humanitarian Law Applicable in Armed Conflicts (Allan Rosas. Helsinki: Suomalainen tiedeakatemia, 1976. Dissertation.)

== See also ==
- List of members of the European Court of Justice
