= Rewe-Zentral AG v Bundesmonopolverwaltung für Branntwein =

1979 EU law decision

Cassis de Dijon
- European Court of Justice

Submitted 22 May 1978 Decided 20 February 1979
- Full case name: Rewe-Zentral AG v Bundesmonopolverwaltung für Branntwein
- Case: C-120/78
- CelexID: 61978CJ0120
- ECLI: ECLI:EU:C:1979:42
- Language of proceedings: German

Court composition
- President; Hans Kutscher
- Judge Rapporteur; Pierre Pescatore
- Judges: Josse Mertens de Wilmars; Lord Mackenzie Stuart; André Donner; Max Sørensen; A. O'Keeffe; Giacinto Bosco; Adolphe Touffait
- Advocate General; Francesco Capotorti

Legislation affecting
- Art 34 TFEU

Keywords
- Quantitative restriction on trade, Measures of equivalent effect

Rewe-Zentral AG v Bundesmonopolverwaltung für Branntwein (1979) Case C-120/78, popularly known as Cassis de Dijon after its subject matter, is an EU law decision of the European Court of Justice. The case is a seminal judicial interpretation of what is today article 34 of the Treaty on the Functioning of the European Union. It established the EU principle of mutual recognition for goods.

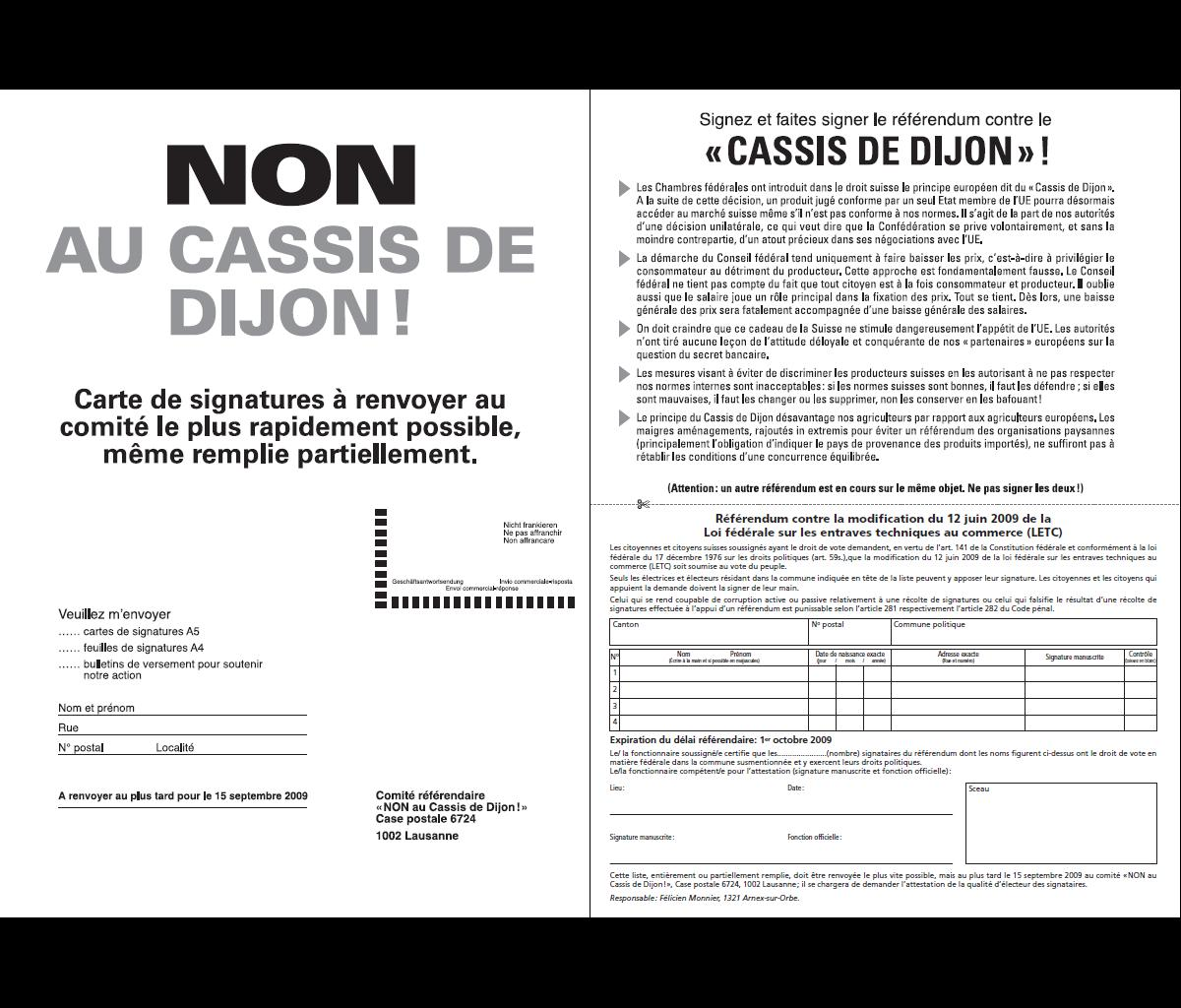
Collection of signatures to force a referendum on the adoption of the "Cassis de Dijon" principle (2009)

The Court held that a regulation applying to both imported and to domestic goods (an "indistinctly applicable measure") that produces an effect equivalent to a quantitative import restriction is an unlawful restriction on the free movement of goods.

In the same ruling, the Court established the so-called rule of reason, allowing non-discriminatory restrictive measures to be justified on grounds other than those listed in article 36 TFEU.

== Facts ==
Rewe, a large German retail company, wanted to import and sell Cassis de Dijon, a crème de cassis blackcurrant liqueur produced in France. The liqueur contained between 15 and 20 per cent alcohol by volume (ABV). Germany, however, had a law specifying that products sold as fruit liqueurs be over 25 per cent ABV. The Bundesmonopolverwaltung für Branntwein (Federal Monopoly Administration for Spirits), part of the Federal Ministry of Finance, informed Rewe that it would not be able to market Cassis in Germany as a liqueur.

Rewe challenged the decision as a breach of European law, specifically of Article 30 Treaty of Rome (TEC).

== Judgment ==
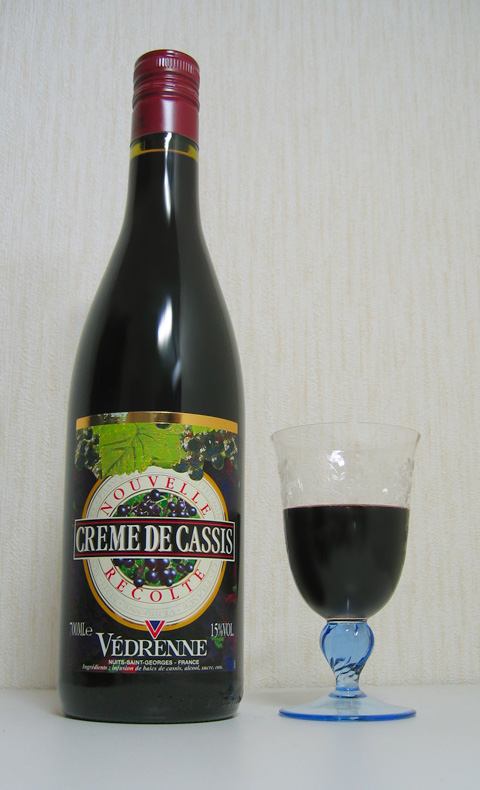
A bottle of Cassis de Dijon, a form of crème de cassis

The ECJ held that the German legislation represented a measure having an effect equivalent to a quantitative restriction on imports and was thus in breach of article 34 of the Treaty:

8. In the absence of common rules relating to the production and marketing of alcohol – a proposal for a regulation submitted to the Council by the Commission on 7 December 1976 (Official Journal c 309, p.2) not yet having received the Council's approval – it is for the member states to regulate all matters relating to the production and marketing of alcohol and alcoholic beverages on their own territory.

Obstacles to movement within the Community resulting from disparities between the national laws relating to the marketing of the products in question must be accepted in so far as those provisions may be recognized as being necessary in order to satisfy mandatory requirements relating in particular to the effectiveness of fiscal supervision, the protection of public health, the fairness of commercial transactions and the defence of the consumer.

9. The government of the Federal Republic of Germany, intervening in the proceedings, put forward various arguments which, in its view, justify the application of provisions relating to the minimum alcohol content of alcoholic beverages, adducing considerations relating on the one hand to the protection of public health and on the other to the protection of the consumer against unfair commercial practices.

10. As regards the protection of public health the German government states that the purpose of the fixing of minimum alcohol contents by national legislation is to avoid the proliferation of alcoholic beverages on the national market, in particular alcoholic beverages with a low alcohol content, since, in its view, such products may more easily induce a tolerance towards alcohol than more highly alcoholic beverages.

11. Such considerations are not decisive since the consumer can obtain on the market an extremely wide range of weakly or moderately alcoholic products and furthermore a large proportion of alcoholic beverages with a high alcohol content freely sold on the German market is generally consumed in a diluted form.

12. The German government also claims that the fixing of a lower limit for the alcohol content of certain liqueurs is designed to protect the consumer against unfair practices on the part of producers and distributors of alcoholic beverages.

This argument is based on the consideration that the lowering of the alcohol content secures a competitive advantage in relation to beverages with a higher alcohol content, since alcohol constitutes by far the most expensive constituent of beverages by reason of the high rate of tax to which it is subject.

Furthermore, according to the German government, to allow alcoholic products into free circulation wherever, as regards their alcohol content, they comply with the rules laid down in the country of production would have the effect of imposing as a common standard within the community the lowest alcohol content permitted in any of the member states, and even of rendering any requirements in this field inoperative since a lower limit of this nature is foreign to the rules of several member states.

13. As the Commission rightly observed, the fixing of limits in relation to the alcohol content of beverages may lead to the standardization of products placed on the market and of their designations, in the interests of a greater transparency of commercial transactions and offers for sale to the public.

However, this line of argument cannot be taken so far as to regard the mandatory fixing of minimum alcohol contents as being an essential guarantee of the fairness of commercial transactions, since it is a simple matter to ensure that suitable information is conveyed to the purchaser by requiring the display of an indication of origin and of the alcohol content on the packaging of products.

14. It is clear from the foregoing that the requirements relating to the minimum alcohol content of alcoholic beverages do not serve a purpose which is in the general interest and such as to take precedence over the requirements of the free movement of goods, which constitutes one of the fundamental rules of the Community.

In practice, the principal effect of requirements of this nature is to promote alcoholic beverages having a high alcohol content by excluding from the national market products of other member states which do not answer that description.

It therefore appears that the unilateral requirement imposed by the rules of a member state of a minimum alcohol content for the purposes of the sale of alcoholic beverages constitutes an obstacle to trade which is incompatible with the provisions of Article 30 of the Treaty.

There is therefore no valid reason why, provided that they have been lawfully produced and marketed in one of the member states, alcoholic beverages should not be introduced into any other member state; the sale of such products may not be subject to a legal prohibition on the marketing of beverages with an alcohol content lower than the limit set by the national rules.

15. Consequently, the first question should be answered to the effect that the concept of "measures having an effect equivalent to quantitative restrictions on imports" contained in Article 30 of the Treaty is to be understood to mean that the fixing of a minimum alcohol content for alcoholic beverages intended for human consumption by the legislation of a member state also falls within the prohibition laid down in that provision where the importation of alcoholic beverages lawfully produced and marketed in another member state is concerned.

== Significance ==
In 2010, Switzerland unilaterally adopted this principle: generally, goods that can be lawfully produced or marketed according to standards applying in the European Union can also be lawfully produced or marketed in Switzerland or imported from the EU into Switzerland.
