= Max Sørensen =

Danish diplomat

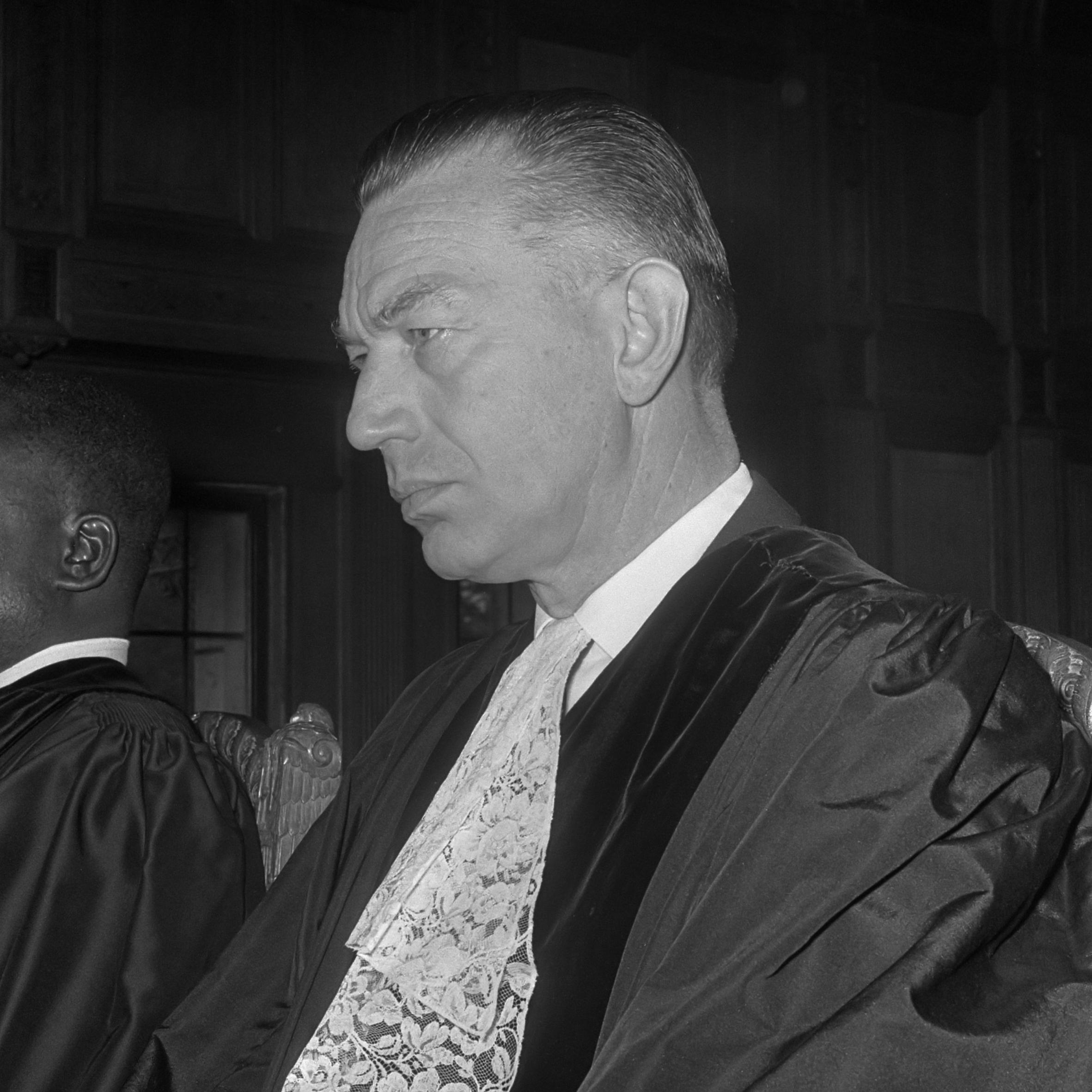
- Sørensen in 1968

Judge of the European Court of Human Rights
- In office 1980–1981
- Nominated by: Government of Denmark
- Preceded by: Helga Pedersen
- Succeeded by: Jørgen Gersing

Judge of the European Court of Justice
- In office 1973–1979
- Nominated by: Government of Denmark
- Preceded by: Seat established
- Succeeded by: Ole Due

Personal details
- Born: 19 February 1913 Copenhagen, Denmark
- Died: 11 October 1981 (aged 68) Risskov, Aarhus, Denmark
- Spouse: Ellen Jacobsen (m. 1940; d. 2005)
- Education: University of Copenhagen; Graduate Institute of International Studies

Max Sørensen (February 19, 1913 in Copenhagen – October 11, 1981 in Risskov) was a Danish diplomat, judge, and professor of international law. He holds the distinction of being the first person to have sat as a judge on both the European Court of Justice and the European Court of Human Rights.

== Life ==
The son of a merchant, Sørensen studied law at the University of Copenhagen and at the Graduate Institute of International Studies in Geneva. He worked in the Danish Foreign Ministry from 1938. During his tenure there, he worked as Attaché Embassy in Bern and in 1944 as Secretary of Legation in London. In 1945 he was promoted to Deputy Head at the State Department. He left that post in 1947 to become a full professor of international law and constitutional law at the Aarhus University. He obtained his doctorate in law.

Sørensen engaged in various positions of international politics and law. In 1949 he was a member of the Danish delegation to the London Conference on the Treaty of London, which established the Council of Europe. Between 1949 and 1951, he represented Denmark in the United Nations Commission on Human Rights. From 1954, he sat on the Sub-Commission on Prevention of Discrimination and Protection of Minorities for two years, and he also sat on a committee that deals with the application of the International Labour Organization addressed conventions until 1964.

In 1955 he was appointed to the European Commission on Human Rights where he sat until 1973. He served as president of that commission from 1967 to 1972. From 1956 to 1972, he also served as a legal adviser to the Danish Foreign Ministry. He headed the Danish delegation for the first and second United Nations Law of the Sea Conferences in 1958 and 1960, respectively. He was appointed to sit as judge ad hoc on the International Court of Justice by the governments of Denmark and The Netherlands for North Sea Continental Shelf cases (1968-1969). He retired from the University of Arhus in 1972.

From 1973 to 1979, Sørensen sat as a judge on the European Court of Justice alongside other famous jurists, including Pierre Pescatore, Robert Lecourt, André Donner, Alexander Mackenzie Stuart Hans Kutscher, and Josse Mertens de Wilmars. From 1980 to 1981, he sat as a judge of the European Court of Human Rights. He was the first of four lawyers who spoke at both institutions. He died in 1981 at the age of 68 years.

Sørensen was a member of the Permanent Court of Arbitration, the Institut de Droit International and sat on the boards of trustees of the Max Planck Institute for Comparative Public Law and International Law and the Hague Academy of International Law. At the latter he gave two guest lectures on "Le Conseil de l'Europe" (1952) and "Principes de droit international public" (1960).

=== Personal life ===
in 1940, Sørensen married Ellen Jacobsen, daughter of Major-General Carl Jacobsen.

== Bibliography ==
Sørensen published his first legal paper at the age of 19, "La prescription en droit international". "Les sources du droit international" (1946) and his lecture "Principes de droit international public" at the Hague Academy of International Law (1960) are considered to be his most important works. He was editor of the international law textbook "Manual of Public International Law", which contained the contributions of lawyers from twelve countries. He belonged to the editorial board of the "Yearbook of the European Convention on Human Rights".

== Awards ==
- Honorary doctorate from the Christian-Albrechts University of Kiel (1964)
- Honorary doctorate from the University of Strasbourg
