= Van Gend en Loos v Nederlandse Administratie der Belastingen =

Landmark 1963 European Court of Law decision

van Gend en Loos
- European Court of Justice

Submitted 16 August 1962 Decided 5 February 1963
- Full case name: NV Algemene Transport- en Expeditie-Onderneming van Gend en Loos v Nederlandse Administratie der Belastingen
- Case: 26/62
- CelexID: 61962CJ0026
- ECLI: ECLI:EU:C:1963:1
- Chamber: Full court
- Nationality of parties: Netherlands
- Procedural history: Tariefcommissie, decision of 14 August 1962 (8847/48 T)

Court composition
- Judge Rapporteur; Charles Léon Hammes
- Judges: Louis Delvaux; Rino Rossi; Otto Riese; Alberto Trabucchi; Robert Lecourt; Andreas Matthias Donner
- Advocate General; Karl Roemer

Legislation affecting
- Interpreted Article 12 TEEC

Van Gend en Loos v Nederlandse Administratie der Belastingen (1963) Case 26/62 was a landmark case of the European Court of Justice which established that provisions of the Treaty Establishing the European Economic Community were capable of creating legal rights which could be enforced by both natural and legal persons before the courts of the Community's member states. This is now called the principle of direct effect. The case is acknowledged as being one of the most important, and possibly the most famous development of European Union law.

The case arose from the reclassification of a chemical, by the Benelux countries, into a customs category entailing higher customs charges. Preliminary questions were asked by the Dutch Tariefcommissie in a dispute between Van Gend en Loos and the Dutch Tax Authority (Nederlandse Administratie der Belastingen). The European Court of Justice held that this breached a provision of the treaty requiring member states to progressively reduce customs duties between themselves, and continued to rule that the breach was actionable by individuals before national courts and not just by the member states of the Community themselves.

== Facts ==
Van Gend en Loos, a postal and transportation company, imported urea formaldehyde from West Germany to the Netherlands. The authorities charged them a tariff on the import. Van Gend en Loos objected, stating that it was a clear violation of Article 12 of the Treaty of Rome (now replaced by Article 30 TFEU), which stated:

"Member States shall refrain from introducing between themselves any new customs duties on imports and exports or any charges having equivalent effect, and from increasing those which they already apply in their trade with each other."

Van Gend en Loos paid the tariff but then sought to retrieve the money in the national court (Tariefcommissie). The Tariefcommissie made a request for a preliminary ruling to the European Court of Justice, asking whether the then Article 12 of the Treaty of Rome conferred rights on the nationals of a member state that could be enforced in national courts.

The Tariefcommissie argued:

(i) that as the Netherlands had, for the most part, complied with Article 12 (by generally reducing and abolishing tariffs), their exceptional increase in the tariff on urea-formaldehyde should be overlooked (de minimis lex non curat); and
(ii) that the treaty was an agreement between member states, and as the importers were obviously not parties to the treaty, they had no standing.

Advocate General Roemer's opinion indicated that some provisions of the treaty could have "direct effect" (that citizens could rely on them) but that Article 12 was not one of them.

== Judgment ==
Ignoring advocate opinion, the European Court of Justice held that Van Gend en Loos could recover the money it paid under the tariff.

Article 12 was capable of creating personal rights for Van Gend en Loos, even though this was not expressly stated. The Netherlands could not impose a higher tariff than that in force on 1 January 1958 (when the treaty came into force).

An increase in the tariff could arise either through an increase in the rate or through the reclassification of a product into a higher-rated category; both were illegal under Article 12. The question of the proper tariff for urea-formaldehyde (i.e., that which was correctly applied on 1 January 1958) was remitted to the national court.

The Community constitutes a new legal order of international law for the benefit of which the states have limited their sovereign rights, albeit within limited fields and the subjects of which comprise not only member states but also their nationals. Independently of the legislation of member states, Community law therefore not only imposes obligations on individuals but is also intended to confer upon them rights which become part of their legal heritage. These rights arise not only where they are expressly granted by the treaty, but also by reason of obligations which the treaty imposes in a clearly defined way upon individuals as well as upon the member states and upon the institutions of the Community.

[...]

The wording of article 12 contains a clear and unconditional prohibition which is not a positive but a negative obligation. This obligation, moreover, is not qualified by any reservation on the part of states which would make its implementation conditional upon a positive legislative measure enacted under national law. The very nature of this prohibition makes it ideally adapted to produce direct effects in the legal relationship between member states and their subjects.

The court decided that the fact that the failure of member states to comply with EU law could be supervised by enforcement actions brought either by the commission or other member state, did not mean that individuals should not also be able to act as enforcers in national courts. Two reasons were given. The first was that a failure to recognise a concept of direct effect would not give sufficient legal protection to individuals. The second was that individual enforcement was an effective supervisory mechanism. The availability of supervision and legal application of article rights by individuals, the commission and member states is described by Stephen Weatherill as being one of "dual vigilance".

Although the votes among the judges are not publicized, it has been established by now that the case was decided with a narrow majority of four judges voting in favour of the direct effect of EU Law and three judges voting against it.

== Significance ==
The case is authority for the proposition that sufficiently clear and unconditional provisions of the Treaty of Rome are directly effective (as distinct from directly applicable) in their application against the state.

The case illustrates the creative jurisprudence of the European Court of Justice. The doctrine of direct effect is not mentioned in the Treaty. The court justified the doctrine of direct effect on the basis of the autonomous nature of the legal order that was created by the Treaty of Rome. The autonomy of the EEC (now EU) legal order means that EU law itself decides on the manner in which EU law creates effects in the national legal orders. The Court held that the autonomy of EU law was necessary to ensure the compliance of member states with their obligations under the Treaty of Rome. It seems likely that the court took the decision under the influence of French judge Robert Lecourt, who had been appointed to the court in May 1962. Lecourt's speeches and writings repeatedly connect the direct effect doctrine with the suppression of inter-state retaliation and unilateral safeguard mechanisms within the European Economic Community.

The case illustrates a procedure of enforcement of EC law at the national level—direct effect does not require the commission to bring an action against the state. This is significant because it provides a more effective distributed enforcement mechanism.

== See also ==
- Supremacy (European Union law)
- Marbury v. Madison
