= Jan Donner =

Dutch politician (1891–1981)

His Excellency Jan Donner
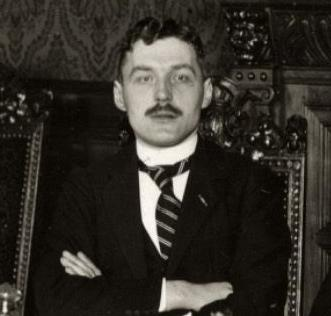
- Donner in 1926

President of the Supreme Court
- In office 1 February 1947 – 1 March 1961
- Preceded by: Johannes van Loon
- Succeeded by: Pieter Hendrik Smits

Judge of the Supreme Court
- In office 5 May 1945 – 1 February 1947

Minister of Justice
- In office 8 March 1926 – 26 May 1933
- Prime Minister: Dirk Jan de Geer (1926–1929); Charles Ruijs de Beerenbrouck (1929–1933)
- Preceded by: Jan Schokking
- Succeeded by: Josef van Schaik

Personal details
- Born: 3 February 1891 Assen, Netherlands
- Died: 2 February 1981 (aged 89) The Hague, Netherlands
- Party: Anti-Revolutionary Party
- Spouse: Golida van den Burg (m. 1916; died 1965)
- Children: André Donner (1918–1992); Jan Hein Donner (1927–1988); 1 other son and 3 daughters
- Relatives: Piet Hein Donner (grandson)
- Education: Utrecht University (Bachelor of Laws, Master of Laws, Doctor of Philosophy)
- Occupation: Politician · Civil servant · Jurist · Judge · Researcher · Author · Professor

Jan Donner (3 February 1891 – 2 February 1981) was a Dutch politician of the defunct Anti-Revolutionary Party (ARP) now merged into the Christian Democratic Appeal (CDA) and jurist. He was granted the honorary title of Minister of State on 16 December 1971.

Donner was Minister of Justice from 1926 to 1933, President of the Dutch Supreme Court from 1946 to 1961, and was named Minister of State in 1971 for his services to the State.

In 1941 he became member of the Royal Netherlands Academy of Arts and Sciences.

He was the father of the chess player Jan Hein Donner and the jurist André Donner, and the grandfather of the former Vice-President of the Council of State and current Minister of State Piet Hein Donner.

== Decorations ==
Honours
Ribbon bar	Honour	Country	Date	Comment
	Commander of the Order of the Netherlands Lion	Netherlands	28 April 1951	Elevated from Knight (31 August 1925)
	Knight Grand Cross of the Order of Orange-Nassau	Netherlands	28 February 1961	Elevated from Commander (17 September 1946)

Honorific Titles
Ribbon bar	Honour	Country	Date	Comment
	Minister of State	Netherlands	16 December 1971	Style of Excellency

Political offices
Preceded by Jan Schokking	Minister of Justice; 1926–1933	Succeeded by Josef van Schaik
Legal offices
Preceded by Johannes van Loon	President of the Supreme Court; 1947–1961	Succeeded by Pieter Hendrik Smits
