= Anne Mackenzie-Stuart =

Scottish activist

Anne, Lady Mackenzie-Stuart (7 June 1930 – 14 October 2008) was a Scottish pro-European Union activist.

== Biography ==
Under the name Anne Millar, the daughter of a solicitor, she was born and grew up in Edinburgh. She spent part of World War II as an evacuee at Bridge of Allan. She attended the University of Edinburgh, graduating in 1951 (MA, LLB). In the 1960s she earned her LLM degree at the Centre of European Governmental Studies from the university, and while there met her future husband, fellow student, Alexander "Jack" Mackenzie-Stuart, the future Baron Mackenzie-Stuart.

In 1972, her husband was named as a British judge at the European Court of Justice in Luxembourg. He would ultimately advance to the presidency of that court. The Mackenzie-Stuarts remained in Luxembourg until 1988, when they returned to Scotland.

Mackenzie-Stuart maintained her interest in "[all] things European" and became vice-chairman of the European Movement in Scotland, campaigning vigorously to convince the Scottish people of the advantages of membership in the European Union. She had held staunchly pro-European Movement views since she was a young woman in 1947, after viewing the devastation wrought in London by The Blitz.

== Affiliations ==
She was a supporter of the Europa Institute at the Edinburgh Law School.

== Death ==
On 14 October 2008 Lady Mackenzie-Stuart died in Edinburgh, aged 78, from undisclosed causes. She was survived by four daughters, three granddaughters and a grandson, as well as her brother, Fergus Millar.
