= List of presidents of the Supreme Court of the Netherlands =

The following persons are or were president of the Supreme Court of the Netherlands:

Period	Name	Details	Portrait
1838–1845	Anthoni Willem Philipse (1766–1845)		
1845–1855	Willem Boudewijn Donker Curtius van Tienhoven (1778–1858)		
1855	Johannes op den Hooff (1795–1855)		
1855–1877	Frans de Greve (1803–1877)		
1877–1878	Justus Dorotheus Willem Pape (1812–1878)		
1878–1882	Campegius Hermannus Gockinga (1804–1882)		
1882–1885	Cornelis Lodewijk de Vos (1804–1885)		
1885–1897	Joost Gerard Kist (1822–1897)		
1897–1908	Focco Bernardus Coninck Liefsting (1827–1913)		
1908–1912	Aernout Philip Theodoor Eyssell (1837–1921)		
1912–1914	Scato Laman Trip (1843–1914)		
1914–1931	Witius Hendrik de Savornin Lohman (1864–1932)		
1931–1933	Augustus Fentener van Vlissingen (1862–1951)		
1933–1939	Rhijnvis Feith (1868–1953)		
1939–1940	Lodewijk Ernst Visser (1871–1942)		
1941–1944	Johannes van Loon (1888–1975)		
1946–1961	Jan Donner (1891–1981)		
1961–1963	Pieter Hendrik Smits (1893–1972)		
1963–1970	Gustaaf Hendrik Alexander Feber (1900–1982)		
1970–1971	Frits de Jong (1901–1974)		
1971–1973	Marius Anne van Rijn van Alkemade (1902–1974)		
1973–1976	Gerard Wiarda (1906–1988)		
1976–1981	Cornelis Willem Dubbink (1914–2014)		
1981–1987	Charles Moons (1917–2005)		
1987–1989	Hans Erik Ras (1921–2008)		
1989–1996	Sjoerd Royer (1929–2019)		
1996–2000	Siep Martens (1930–2001)		
2000–2004	Willem Elize Haak (1934–2021)		
2004–2008	Willibrord Jacob Maria Davids (1938–2024)		
2008–2014	Geert Corstens (born 1946)		
2014–2020	Maarten Feteris (born 1960)		
2020-	Dineke de Groot (born 1965)	First female president of the Supreme Court	
