= Aernouts =

Aernouts or Aernoutsz is a surname. Notable people with the surname include:

- Jim Aernouts (born 1989), Belgian cyclist
- Bart Aernouts (born 1982), Belgian cyclist
- Jurriaen Aernoutsz (fl. 1670s), Dutch navy captain

== See also ==
- Aernout
