= Adrianus van Kleffens =

Dutch judge

Judge of the European Court of Justice
- In office 10 December 1952 – 6 October 1958
- Succeeded by: André Donner

Personal details
- Born: 14 October 1899 Heerenveen, Netherlands
- Died: 2 August 1973 (aged 73) De Steeg, Netherlands

Adrianus van Kleffens (14 October 1899 – 2 Augustus 1973) was a Dutch civil servant and judge. He was a judge at the European Court of Justice from 1952 to 1958.

== Biography ==
Van Kleffens was born to Henricus Cato Van Kleffens and Anna de Graaf in a family of civil servants in Heerenveen. His older brother was Eelco van Kleffens, who would later become a noted diplomat and Minister for Foreign Affairs. Adrianus van Kleffens studied law at Leiden University. After his studies he then went to work at the Secretariat of the League of Nations in Geneva. He later became a judge at the Court of Amsterdam. In 1934 he attained a position as director of the External Trade department of the Dutch Ministry for Economic Affairs. During World War II he was captured and made prisoner of war. After the war had ended in 1945 he went to work at the same Ministry once more, he focused on European economic integration. During that time he also advocated the Benelux union. After his time at the Ministry he became one of the first judges of the European Court of Justice, he served together with fellow Dutchman Jos Serrarens.

== Memberships ==
- Member of the International Maritime Commission
