= Charles Mertens de Wilmars =

Belgian psychiatrist

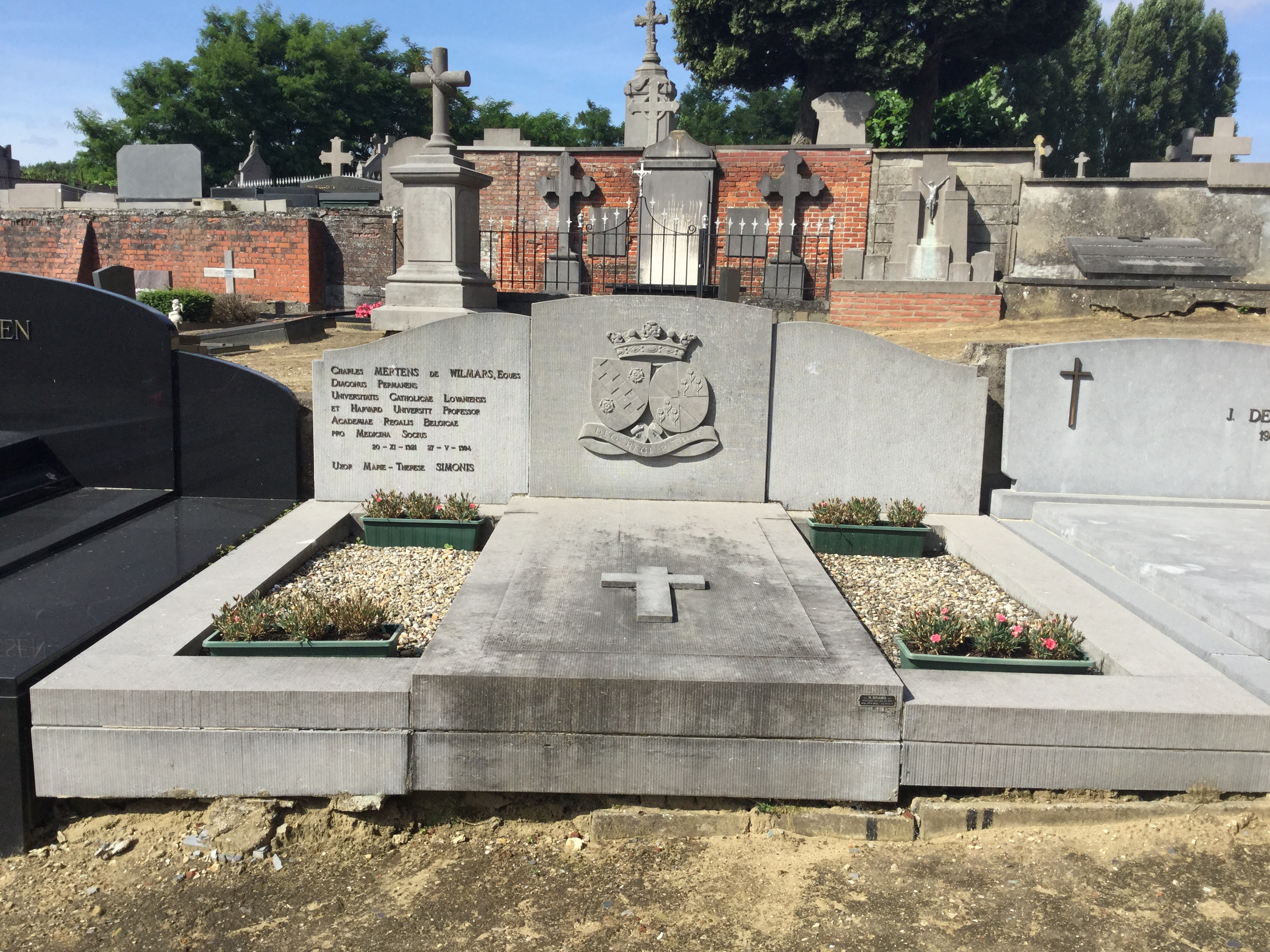
Tombstone of Charles Mertens de Wilmars in the Heverlee Park Abbey

Charles Mertens de Wilmars (Leuven, 21 November 1921 – 1994) was a Belgian psychiatrist.

He graduated as a Doctor of Medicine in 1948, and became a licensed psychologist in 1949. He was taught neurology by Paul van Gehuchten and experimental psychology by Albert Michotte. He spent time at the Maudsley Hospital Medical School, funded by the British Council, after which he benefited from the bursary of the Belgian American Educational Foundation to travel to the United States to meet his colleagues in the field of psychiatric anthropology at Cornell University from 1949 to 1951. He was a visiting lecturer there in 1952, and was then appointed as a professor at Harvard Medical School in which capacity he served for 26 years – from 1966 to 1992. During this period, he rose to be Chair of the Department of Psychiatry.

While doing that, he still kept his interests at the Leuven university, and became professor at its Faculty of Medicine and Psychology until he retired in 1987.

In 1984, at the request of Cardinal Godfried Danneels, he founded a center for the psychological support of priests, and in the year he retired he received an honorary degree: a Bachelor of Theology.

He was a member of the Belgian Royal Academy of Medicine, and held the honours of Grand Officer of the Order of Leopold, the Order of the Crown, and Knight Commander of the Order of the Holy Sepulchre.

== Honors ==
Awarded the Honoris Causa.

== Family ==
He was survived by his wife Marie-Thérèse Mertens de Wilmars. They had five daughters and twenty-two grandchildren and great-grandchildren.

He was the brother of Josse Mertens de Wilmars.
