= Gil Carlos Rodríguez Iglesias =

Spanish judge (1946–2019)

The Most Excellent Gil Carlos Rodríguez Iglesias OAX OS
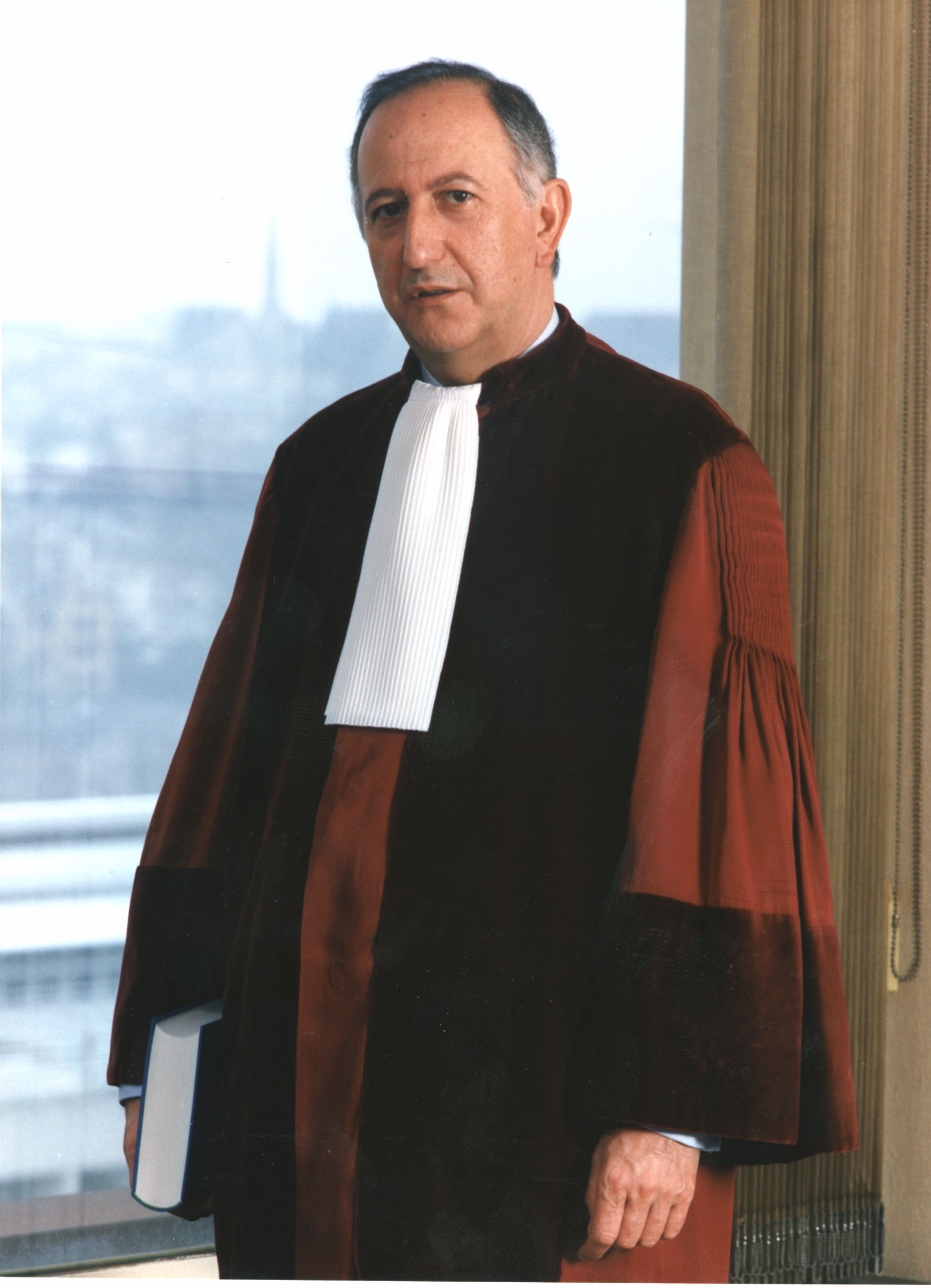

President of the Court of Justice of the European Union
- In office 7 October 1994 – 7 October 2004
- Preceded by: Ole Due
- Succeeded by: Vassilios Skouris

Personal details
- Born: 26 May 1946 Gijón, Asturias, Spain
- Died: 17 January 2019 (aged 72) Madrid, Spain
- Education: University of Oviedo; Autonomous University of Madrid

Gil Carlos Rodríguez Iglesias (26 May 1946 – 17 January 2019) was a Spanish judge at the European Court of Justice between 31 January 1986 and 7 October 2004. He was 9th President of the Court from 7 October 1994 to 7 October 2004.

== Biography ==
Born in Gijón, Asturias, Gil Carlos Rodríguez Iglesias had a degree at University of Oviedo, (1968) and doctorate in law at Universidad Autónoma de Madrid (1975). In 1982 he was appointed Professor of Public International Law at the University of Extremadura and he held the same chair at the University of Granada from 22 June 1983 to 11 October 2003. He spent time as both Judge (6 May 1986 - 31 October 2003) and President (7 October 1994 – 7 October 2004) of the Court of Justice of the European Communities. In December 2003 he was appointed Professor of Public International Law at Madrid's Universidad Complutense. He was Jean Monnet Chair of European Community Law, Director of the Department of European Studies at the Instituto Universitario Ortega y Gasset (2004–05), co-director of the Revista de Derecho Comunitario Europeo and member of the Editorial Boards of various law reviews.

He authored a number of publications, particularly on European Union Law, among which are to be highlighted those on State monopolies and the public sector, the judicial application of EU law, European constitutional affairs and the protection of fundamental rights and liberties.

== See also ==
- List of members of the European Court of Justice

Legal offices
Preceded by Ole Due	President of the European Court of Justice; 1994–2003	Succeeded by Vassilios Skouris
