= Aernout =

Aernout is a masculine Dutch given name. Notable people with the name include:

- Aernout Philip Theodoor Eyssell (1837–1921), Dutch lawyer, judge, and politician
- Aernout Mik (born 1962), Dutch artist
- Aernout van Buchel (1565–1641), Dutch antiquarian and humanist
- Aernout van Lennep (1898–1974), Dutch equestrian
- Aarnout Loudon (1936–2021), Dutch corporate executive and politician
- Aernout van Lynden (born 1954), Dutch-British journalist
- Aernout van Overbeke (1632–1674), Dutch writer and humourist
