= Ole Due =

Danish judge (1932–2005)

President of the Court of Justice of the European Union
- In office 7 October 1988 – 6 October 1994
- Preceded by: Alexander Mackenzie Stuart
- Succeeded by: Gil Carlos Rodríguez Iglesias

Personal details
- Born: 6 March 1931
- Died: 21 January 2005 (aged 73) Hillerød, Denmark

Ole Due (10 February 1931 – 21 January 2005) was a Danish judge who presided over the European Court of Justice from 1988 to 1994.

== Career ==
Ole Due started his career at the Danish Ministry of Justice, culminating in his appointment as Director. He was notably involved with the implementation of the European Community acts at the time of the enlargement in 1973 when Denmark, the United Kingdom and Ireland became members of the European Economic Community and was involved in the drawing up of the Treaty of Accession. He became Adviser ad interim to the Østre Landsret (Eastern High Court of Appeal) in Copenhagen in 1978. Due was also a member of the Danish delegation to The Hague Conference on private international law. He was appointed a Judge of the European Court of Justice from 7 October 1979 to 6 October 1988, in succession to the immensely respected Max Sørensen. He was elected President of the Court of Justice from 7 October 1988 to 6 October 1994.

Due's membership of the Court coincided with vast changes in that Institution's life. First, the accessions of Greece in 1981, Spain and Portugal in 1986 enlarged the membership of the Court. Second, the impetus given to the Community through the Single European Act and the Delors Presidency in general saw a vast growth in the work-load of the Court. This led to the establishment in 1989 of the European Court of First Instance during the Due Presidency aimed at transferring part of the workload of the European Court of Justice. In the period 1979 to 1994, the Court also became a far more exposed institution, whose real powers were gradually recognised. This culminated in the attribution to the Court the power to impose monetary penalties on Member States for their failure to obey Community law, introduced by the Treaty of Maastricht.

Due was also responsible for the huge extension of the Court buildings in Luxembourg, to house the new Court of First Instance, and to give permanent accommodation to the institution's large staff.

As President of a court which rarely voted by majority and gave only en banc judgments, Due had to ensure the adhesion of judges to judgments which they personally may have opposed but were required to sign. He also had to negotiate skilfully between the very disparate wings of the Court's membership, from those with a Statist view to those with an integration-led vision. It was a difficult balancing act, coming as he did from a Statist background. The fact that he was re-elected President unopposed in 1991 shows that he got the balance right.

Due was allegedly embarrassed by the contrast in his working conditions in Luxembourg with a personal staff of 7 and a large suite of luxurious offices, with those of the members of the Højesteret (Supreme Court of Denmark) all working together in a single library. Legend has it that when he used to attend meetings in Denmark, he would leave his chauffeur-driven car around the corner, and proceed to walk to his appointment.

He was a member of the Governing Body of the Academy of European Law from 1992 to 1994. He received a number of foreign honours.

== See also ==
- List of members of the European Court of Justice

Legal offices
Preceded by Alexander Mackenzie-Stuart	President of the European Court of Justice; 1988–1994	Succeeded by Gil Carlos Rodríguez Iglesias
