= Dineke de Groot =

Dutch jurist (born 1965)

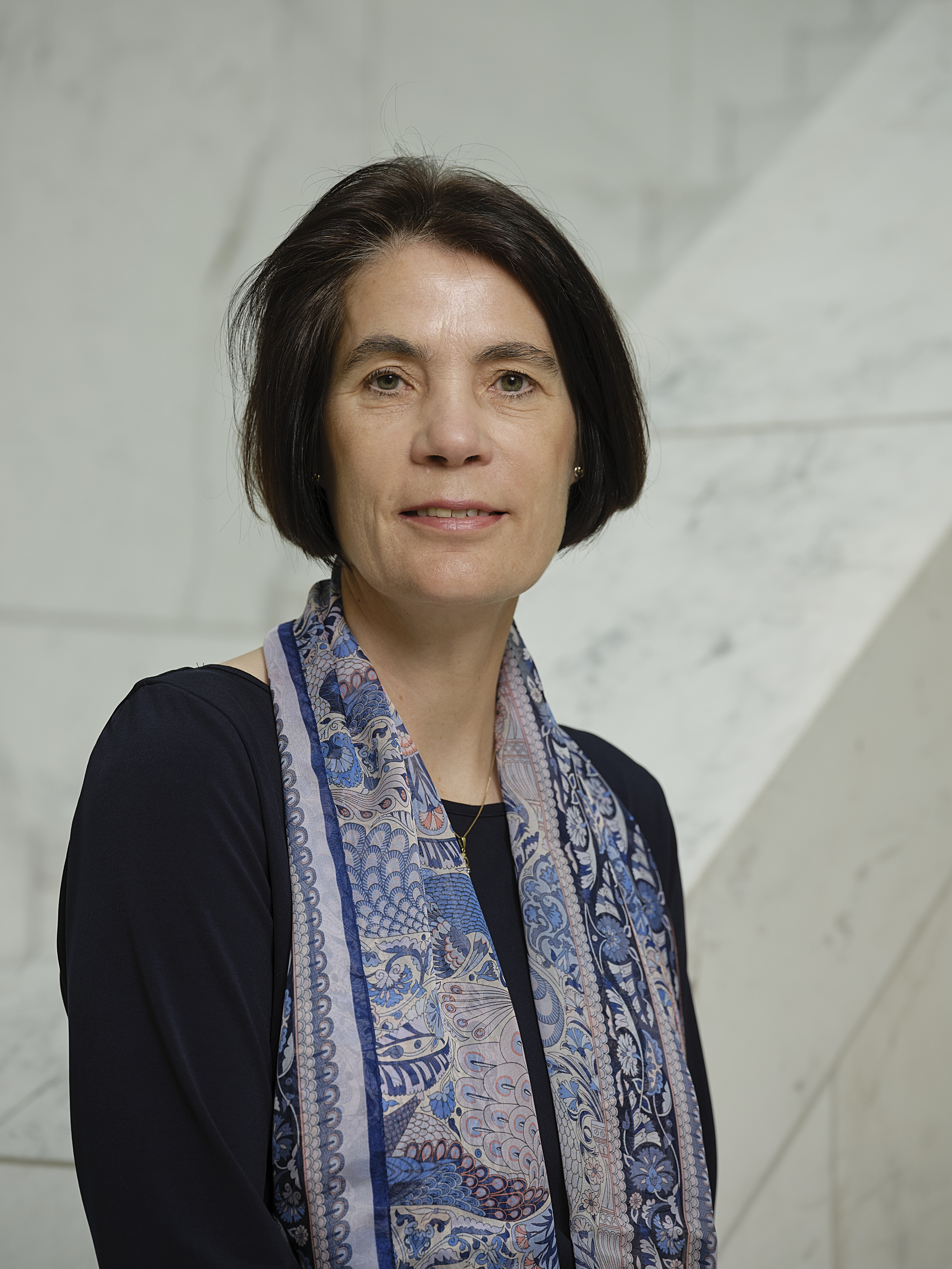

President of the Supreme Court
- In office 1 November 2020 – 31 Oktober 2026
- Monarch: Willem-Alexander
- Preceded by: Maarten Feteris
- Succeeded by: Maarten Kroeze

Personal details
- Born: 11 July 1965 (age 61) Amsterdam, Netherlands

Dineke de Groot is a Dutch jurist who served as the president of the Supreme Court of Netherlands between 2020 and 2026. She was the first woman to serve in the capacity.

She became a justice of the Supreme Court under the civil and tax law since 2012. She joined the judiciary in 1990 after judiciary training and was moved to the Amsterdam District Court in 1996. She was a member of the Arnhem Court of Appeal in 2009 and as counsel until she was made the vice president of the Supreme Court in January 2018. Although, she was an extraordinary professor of jurisprudence and conflict resolution in the Vrije Universiteit Amsterdam during 2011.

She holds a bachelor's degree of law in Vrije Universiteit Amsterdam and also for arts in the Vienna University.

Legal offices
| Preceded by Maarten Feteris | President of the Supreme Court; 1 November 2020 | Succeeded by Present |
