= Willibrord Davids =

Dutch jurist (1938–2024)

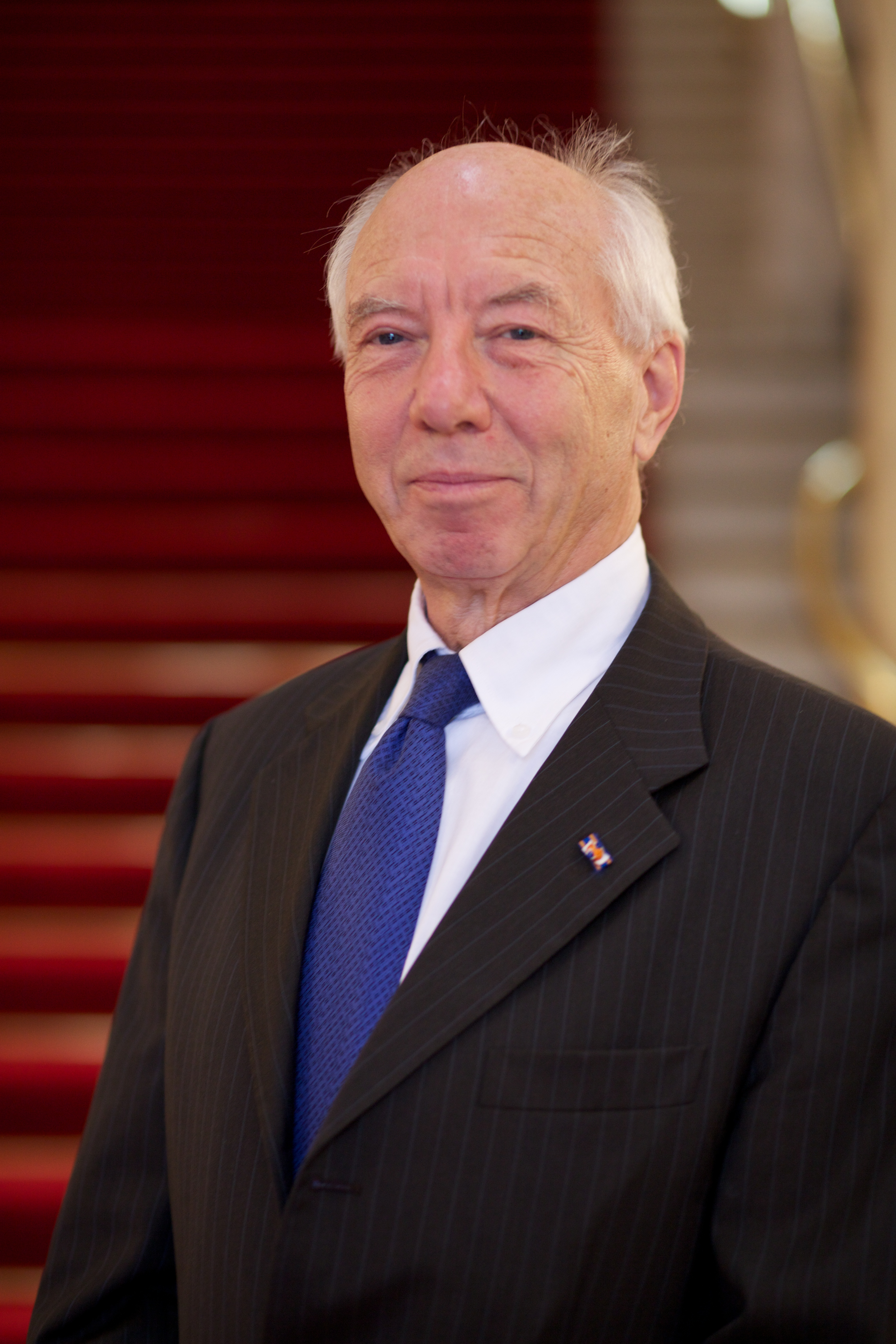
- Davids in 2010

President of the Supreme Court of the Netherlands
- In office 1 May 2004 – 1 November 2008
- Preceded by: Pim Haak
- Succeeded by: Geert Corstens

Personal details
- Born: Willibrord Jacob Maria Davids; 17 October 1938 Rotterdam, Netherlands
- Died: 11 February 2024 (aged 85) The Hague, Netherlands
- Education: Catholic University of Nijmegen
- Occupation: Jurist

Willibrord Jacob Maria Davids (17 October 1938 – 11 February 2024) was a Dutch jurist. He served as President of the Supreme Court from 2004 to 2008.

Davids died in The Hague on 11 February 2024, at the age of 85.
