= Alexander Mackenzie Stuart, Baron Mackenzie-Stuart =

Scottish advocate and judge

The Right Honourable The Lord Mackenzie-Stuart

President of the Court of Justice of the European Union
- In office 1984–1988
- Preceded by: Josse Mertens de Wilmars
- Succeeded by: Ole Due

Member of the House of Lords
- Lord Temporal
- Life peerage 18 October 1988 – 1 April 2000

Personal details
- Born: 18 November 1924
- Died: 1 April 2000 (aged 75)
- Spouse: Anne Millar
- Children: 4

Alexander John Mackenzie Stuart, Baron Mackenzie-Stuart (18 November 1924 – 1 April 2000) was a Scottish advocate and judge. He was the first judge from a United Kingdom jurisdiction to sit on the European Court of Justice in Luxembourg, later becoming its president.

== Early life ==
Jack Mackenzie Stuart, as he was widely known, was born in Aberdeen. His parents were Prof A. Mackenzie Stuart, a King's Counsel and Professor of Scots Law at Aberdeen University, and Amy Margaret Dean. He was educated at Fettes College in Edinburgh.

In 1942, Mackenzie Stuart joined the British Army, where he was commissioned in the Royal Engineers. After a short period studying the War Office Engineering Course at Sidney Sussex College, Cambridge, he was deployed throughout northern Europe on active service, mainly building bridges. In his speech on retirement from the Court of Justice in 1988, he spoke of the indelible effect at an impressionable age of seeing the ashes of the Ruhr. A staff post in Burma and a spell dismantling mines on the Northumbrian coast then followed, and it was only after the war was over that he returned to Cambridge on a law scholarship, taking first class honours in Part II of the Tripos in 1949, followed by an LL.B. with distinction at Edinburgh University two years later.

== Early career ==
Mackenzie Stuart was admitted to the Faculty of Advocates in 1951 and quickly acquired a substantial practice, being appointed as Queen's Counsel in 1963. In those days there was no specialisation and he was equally at home in the realms of trusts (on which his father had written the standard textbook), taxation and estate duty (as Counsel to the Revenue) and coal-mining accidents.

In 1971 he was appointed Sheriff of Aberdeen and it was not long before he was appointed a Senator of the College of Justice, with the judicial title Lord Mackenzie Stuart. He was then appointed, with effect from January 1973, as a Judge of the European Court. The Prime Minister and Foreign Secretary agreed that one of the posts in Luxembourg - Judge or Advocate General - would go to a Scots lawyer. Mackenzie-Stuart's taste for European law had been whetted by his wife who studied for an LL.M. with Professor John Mitchell, and he was asked at an early stage whether he would like to be Advocate General. The judgeship was meanwhile offered to senior lawyers in London.

== European Court of Justice ==
Mackenzie-Stuart was unexpectedly offered the post of Judge at the European Court of Justice in Luxembourg. The Mackenzie Stuarts moved to Luxembourg and set up home in a farming village where they quickly became part of its life. They worked hard to build up the spirit of the embryo British community and his wife, Anne, became a driving force in the European School. The Court of Justice was dominated by Robert Lecourt.

With Jean-Pierre Warner, the Advocate General, Mackenzie Stuart worked to overcome suspicions and engineer the synchromesh of potentially incompatible legal systems which has continued to work ever since. In reality, the work of the European Court touches very little on the historical differences between the common law and the civil law, and much more on the modern problems of ensuring cross-frontier freedom to trade and to work, market regulation and fair competition.

=== President of the Court of Justice ===
He was later elected by the College of Judges as the seventh president of the court – an office he neither sought nor wanted. He took over the presidency at a difficult time. By failing to nominate new judges, some governments were holding up the work of the court, whose workload was growing exponentially. Greece had joined in 1981, followed by Spain and Portugal in 1986, taking the number of official languages from six to nine.

The court building ("the rusty Palais" opened in 1972) was already too small, and some of the translators were working in prefabricated huts. Through quiet persistence with judges, staff, community institutions and national governments, the president ensured that the work got done, a new building was planned and the foundations were laid for a new court structure, involving the creation of a Court of First Instance.

== Later life ==
In recognition of his contribution to the work of the Court of Justice and to community law, he was created a Life Peer on 18 October 1988 as Baron Mackenzie-Stuart, of Dean in the district of the City of Edinburgh (his peerage, unlike his surname and Scottish judicial title, was hyphenated).

In 1989 he became the first President of The Academy of Experts continuing until 1992 when he was succeeded by Gordon Slynn, Baron Slynn of Hadley.

== Family ==
His wife, the former Anne Burtholme Millar (died 2008), was known for her legendary parties, both in Edinburgh and Luxembourg. The Mackenzie-Stuarts had four daughters, all of whom survived both their parents. Anne Mackenzie-Stuart shone in her own right as chairperson of the Parent-Teacher Association of the European School in Luxembourg.

== Death ==
Alexander John Mackenzie-Stuart died on 1 April 2000, in Edinburgh, aged 75.

== See also ==
- List of members of the European Court of Justice

Legal offices
Preceded by Josse Mertens de Wilmars	President of the European Court of Justice; 1984–1988	Succeeded by Ole Due
