= Charles-Léon Hammes =

Luxembourgish lawyer and judge (1898–1967)

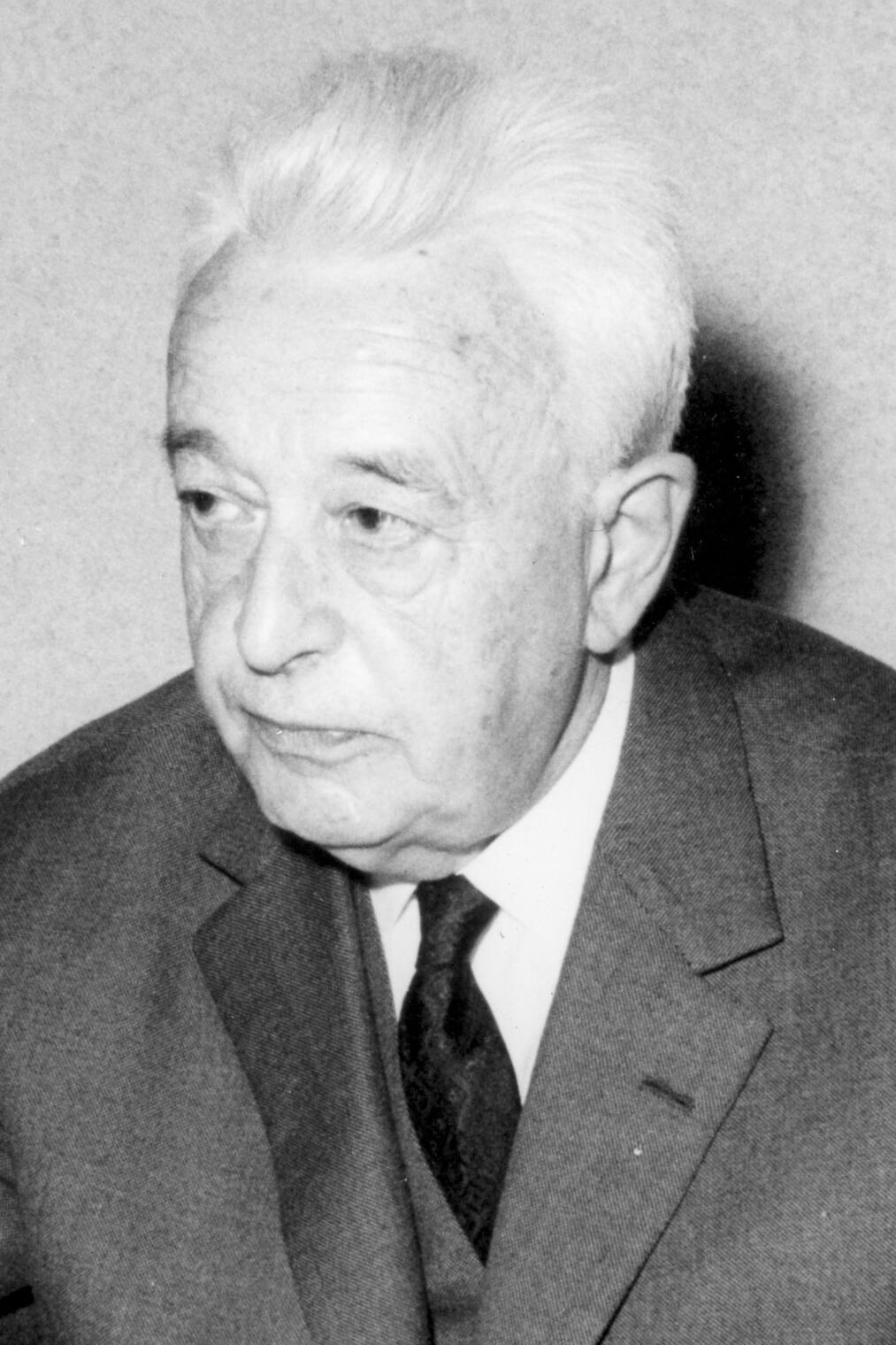
Hammes in 1967

Charles-Léon Hammes (21 May 1898 – 9 December 1967) was a Luxembourgish lawyer, judge and the third president of the European Court of Justice.

== Early life ==
Hammes was born in 1898 in Falk, German Empire (today Faulquemont, France). After serving as a lawyer at the Luxembourg bar between 1922 and 1927, he made a career as attaché at the Ministry for Justice (1927–29); Magistrate (1929–30); Deputy State Prosecutor (1930–37); Judge at a tribunal d'arrondissement (District Court) (1937–45); Judge at the Cour supérieure de justice (High Court of Justice) (1945–52); Councillor on the Litigation Committee of the Council of State (1951–52); Professor Extraordinary at the University of Brussels; member of the Council of State of Luxembourg; member of the Benelux Commission on Unification of Law; President of the National Commission for the Hague Conference on Private International Law; President of the Legislative Studies Commission of the Grand Duchy. In 1952, a became a Judge at the Court of Justice of the European Coal and Steel Community (ECSC), and later a judge at the Court of Justice of the European Economic Community (EEC) from 1958 to 1964, when he became the President of the Court of Justice. During the last two years, Hammes was also president of the Court of Arbitration of the Association between the EEC and the African and Malagasy States associated with that Community (1965–67). He died only two months after retiring from the Court of Justice in 1967.

== See also ==
- List of members of the European Court of Justice

== Sources ==
- Former Members, European Court of Justice official website.

Legal offices
Preceded by André Donner	President of the European Court of Justice; 1964–1967	Succeeded by Robert Lecourt
