= Aernout Philip Theodoor Eyssell =

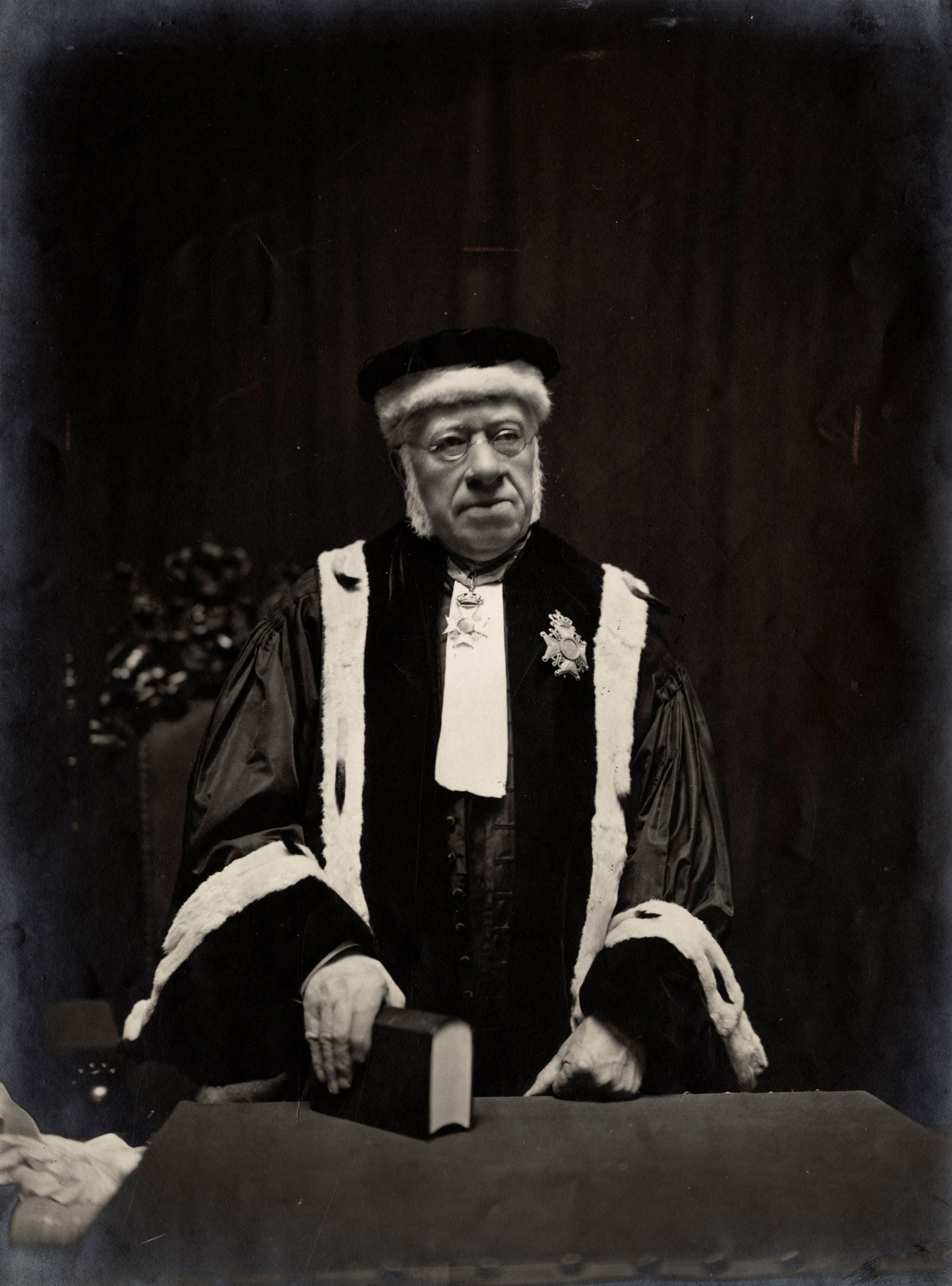
Aernout Philip Theodoor Eyssell in 1912

Aernout Philip Theodoor Eyssell (July 19, 1837 – March 23, 1921) was a Dutch lawyer, judge and president of the Dutch Supreme Court.

== Biography ==
Eyssell was born on July 19, 1837, in The Hague. His father was the lawyer Martinus Eyssell (1807–1888) and his mother Henriëtte Elsabine Vreede (1813–1876). In 1855 he started studying law at Utrecht University. In 1859 he obtained a doctoral degree. In the same year he participated in a competition of the Académie des Sciences in Dijon. He wrote an essay about the French lawyer Hugues Doneau and won the competition. His manuscript – written in Latin – was translated into French and was published in 1860 under the title Doneau, sa vie et ses ouvrages. L'école de Bourges; synthèse du Droit romain au XVIe siècle; son influence jusqu'à nos jours.

He became a lawyer in his hometown and in 1878 he became a deputy judge at the district court. From 1880 to 1887 he was a member of the State Committees for the revision of the Dutch Civil Code (Burgerlijk Wetboek). In 1886 he was appointment as a Justice at the Dutch Supreme Court. He was elected by the House of Representatives over the anti-revolutionary Petrus Johannes van Swinderen. In 1908 he was as appointed president of the Supreme Court. He fulfilled this position until his retirement at July 1, 1912.

After his retirement, he continued to write for the magazine Themis. He died on 23 March 1921 in The Hague.

== Publications (selection) ==
- Moeten voor de toelating tot de rechtspraktijk en de magistratuur andere dan de bestaande eischen en waarborgen worden gesteld? zoo ja, welke?: praeadvies (1899).
- s-Gravenhage van voorheen en thans: in brieven (1879–1880)
- Advies in zake de procedure van H.H. kerkvoogden te St. Annapar. tegen de landeigenaren van het Oud-Bildt (1878), with Wijnand Heineken
- Welk gevangenisstelsel is voor ons land het meest aanbevelenswaardig? : praeadviezen (1872), with Jacob Domela Nieuwenhuis
- Twee jaren celstraf? (1871).
- Een post op de begrooting des ministers van Justitie (1871).
- De regtsmagt over vreemdelingen in Nederland (1864).
- Grondwet en protectie als haar eerste gevolg: de waarschuwing eens tachtigers aan zijne landgenooten: opgedragen aan Mr.S. van Houten (1917).
