= Supreme Court of the Netherlands =

Highest court of the Kingdom of the Netherlands

Supreme Court of Kingdom of the Netherlands
- Hoge Raad der Nederlanden (Dutch)
- Logo of the Supreme Court of the Netherlands

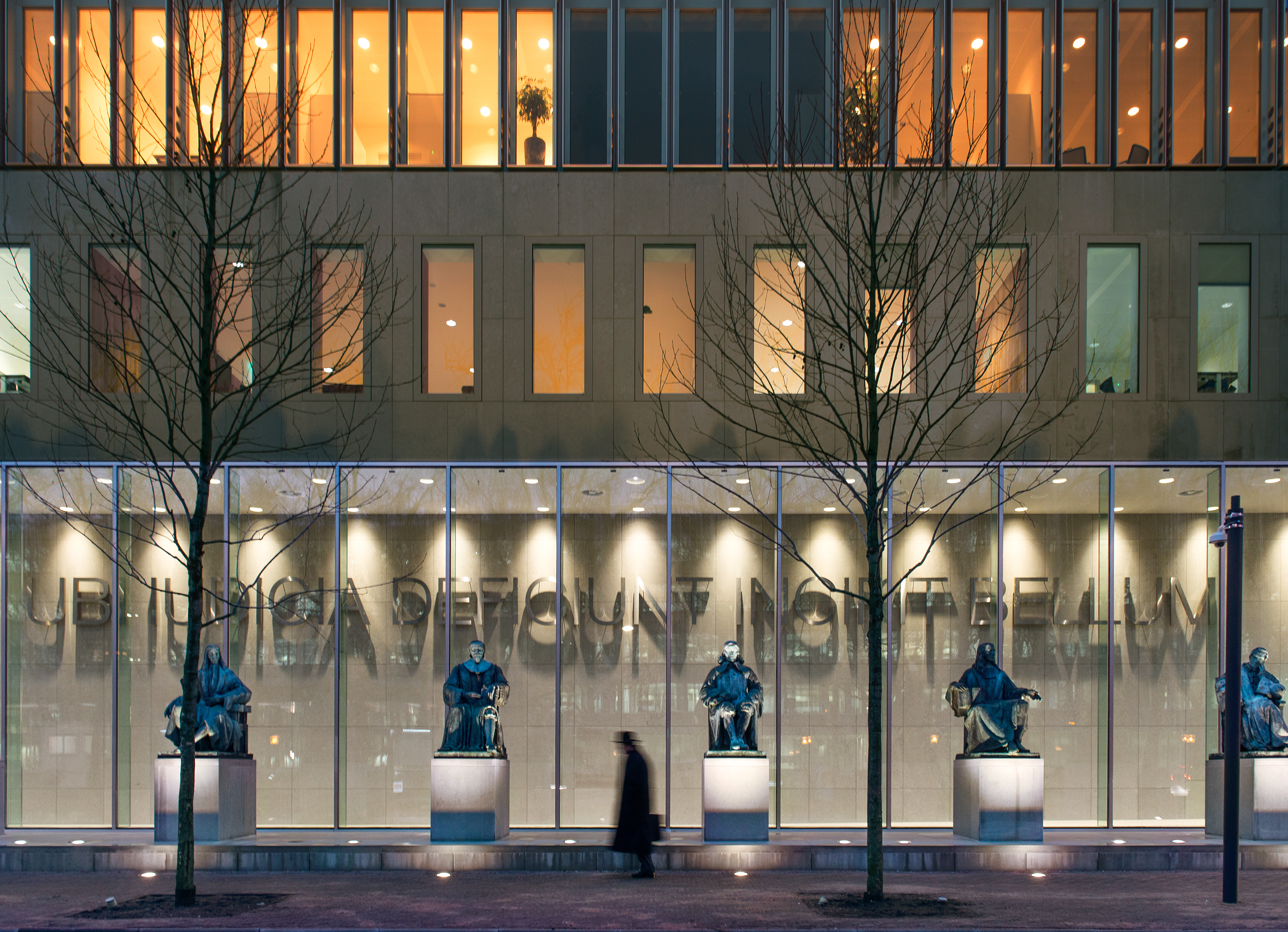
- Supreme Court of the Netherlands, The Hague
- Interactive map of Supreme Court of Kingdom of the Netherlands
- 52°5′0.52″N 4°18′41.85″E
- Established: 1 October 1838
- Jurisdiction: Kingdom of the Netherlands
- Location: The Hague, Netherlands
- Coordinates: 52°5′0.52″N 4°18′41.85″E
- Motto: Ubi iudicia deficiunt incipit bellum Where judicial decisions fail, Violence begins.
- Composition method: Selected by the House of Representatives on advice of the Supreme Court and appointed by royal decree
- Authorised by: Constitution of the Netherlands; Statute of the Kingdom of the Netherlands
- Judge term length: Life tenure with mandatory retirement at the age of 70
- Number of positions: Varies (currently 36)
- Website: www.hogeraad.nl

President of the Supreme Court
- Currently: Dineke de Groot
- Since: 1 November 2020

The Supreme Court of the Netherlands (Dutch: Hoge Raad der Nederlanden [ˈɦoːɣə ˈraː dɛr ˈneːdərlɑndə(n)] or simply Hoge Raad), officially the High Council of the Netherlands, is the final court of appeal in civil, criminal and tax cases in the Netherlands, including Curaçao, Sint Maarten and Aruba. The Court was established on 1 October 1838 and is located in The Hague.

The Supreme Court rules on civil and criminal matters. In certain administrative cases it has final jurisdiction as well, while in other cases this jurisdiction rests with the adjudicative division of the Council of State (Raad van State), the Central Appeals Tribunal (Centrale Raad van Beroep), the Trade and Industry Appeals Tribunal (College van Beroep van het bedrijfsleven) as well as judicial institutions in the Caribbean part of the Kingdom of the Netherlands. The Court is a court of cassation, which means that it has the competence to quash or affirm rulings of lower courts, but no competence to re-examine or question the facts. It only considers whether the lower courts applied the law correctly and the rulings have sufficient reasoning. In so doing it establishes case law.

As the government of the Netherlands is characterised by parliamentary sovereignty, the Supreme Court cannot overturn primary legislation made by the States-General. This is laid out in Article 120 of the Constitution, which states that courts may not rule on the constitutionality of laws passed by the States General and treaties. With the exception of the Constitutional Court of Sint Maarten (which rules on constitutionality with regard to the Sint Maarten constitution only) courts thus have little competence for judicial review with respect to the Constitution. However, it is possible for courts (including the Supreme Court) to overturn secondary legislation made by the executive government.

The Supreme Court currently consists of 36 judges: a president, six vice presidents, twenty-five justices (raadsheren, literally "Lords of the Council") and four justices extraordinary (buitengewone dienst). All judges are appointed for life, until they retire at their own request or mandatorily on their 70th birthday.

== History ==
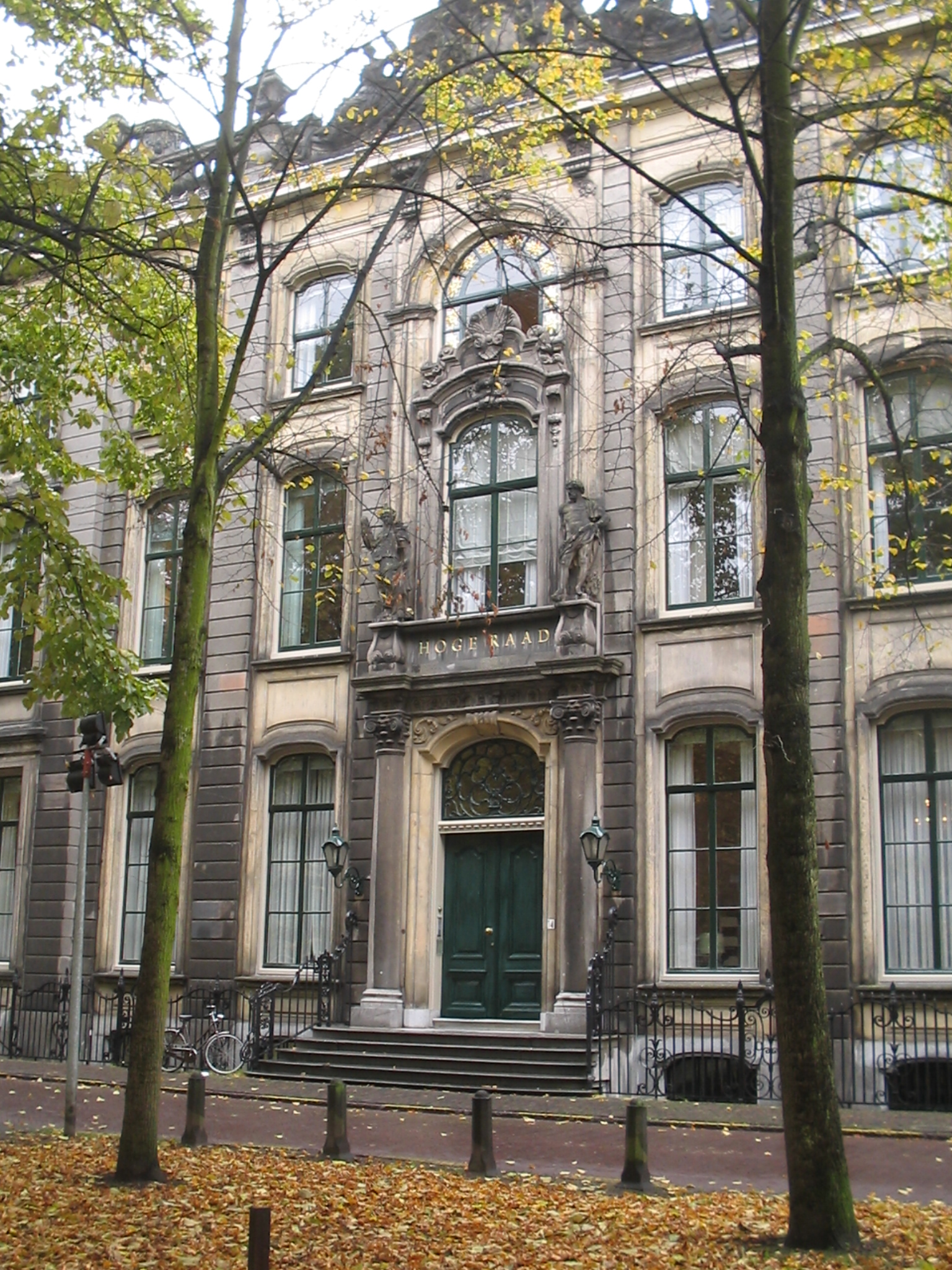
The Huis Huguetan on Lange Voorhout, Supreme Court seat from 1988 to 2016

The development of cassation in the Netherlands was heavily influenced by the French during the Batavian Revolution at the end of the 18th century. The establishment of the Supreme Court on 1838 brought an end to the Great Council of Mechelen and its successor, the Hoge Raad van Holland en Zeeland, which both served as high appellate courts.

=== Second World War ===
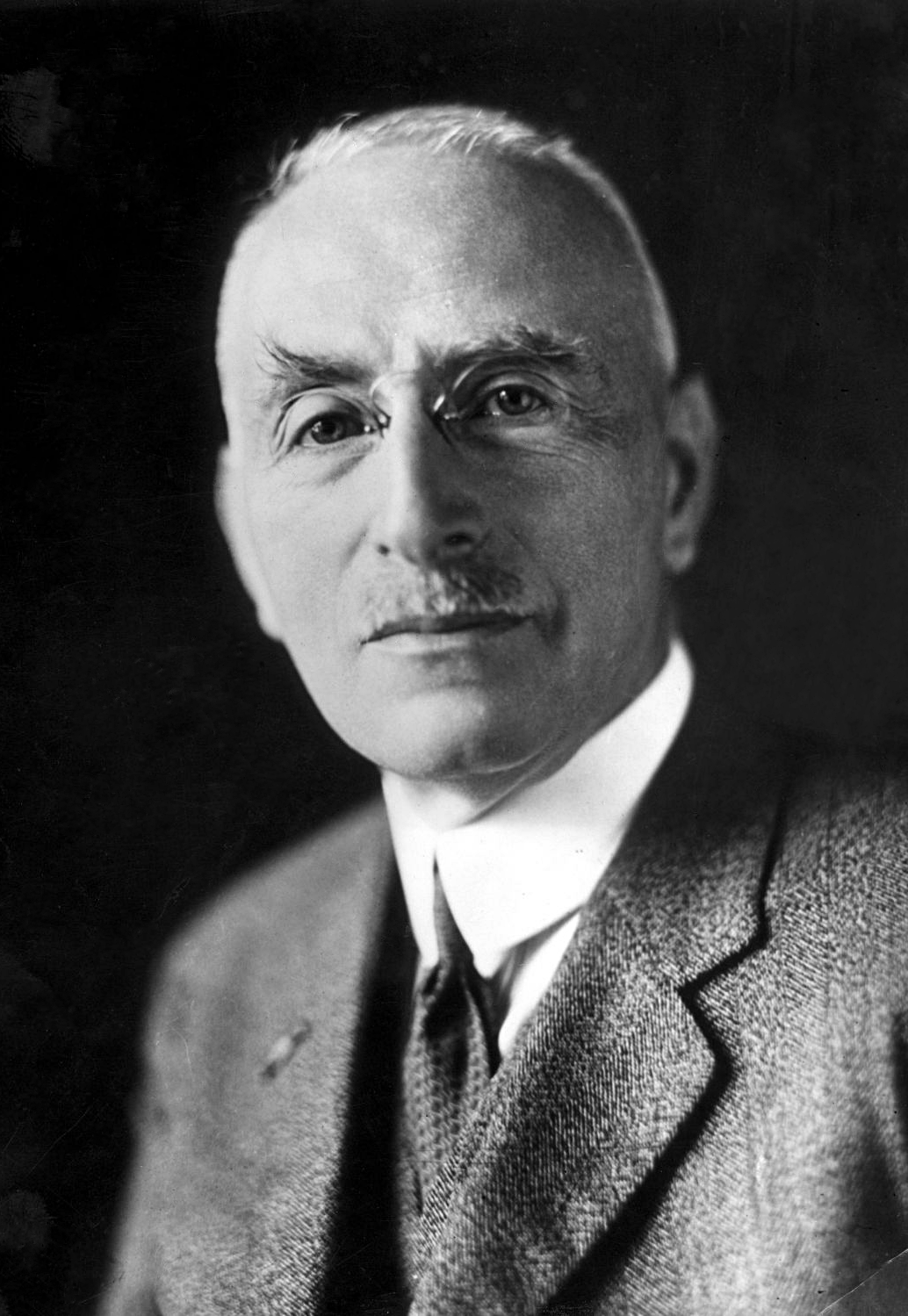
Lodewijk Ernst Visser, President of the Dutch Supreme Court from 1939 to 1941, forced to resign by the Nazi occupying forces.

During the Nazi occupation, the Supreme Court kept functioning. In November 1940 the German occupiers forced its president, Lodewijk Ernst Visser, to resign because he was Jewish. It was part of Nazi policy to separate Jews as a group, disrupting legal and social norms, in pursuit of their murderous policy of the Final Solution. Visser's colleagues did not protest. The members who remained also signed a compulsory declaration about Aryans. Visser "repeatedly warned the Dutch authorities not to relinquish jurisdiction over Jewish citizens and residents, and not to allow their legal protection to be lifted."

After the liberation, people reproached the Court for its weak and legalistic attitude. The Court justified its stance because it wished to guarantee the continuity of its jurisdiction under the Nazi occupation and purportedly avoid involvement in politics. They did not take a stand on principle against the German occupation or set a moral example, perhaps because they felt they were not in a position to do so. This was demonstrated in a so-called "Test sentence", (Supreme Court, 12 January 1942, NJ 1942/271), in which the Supreme Court ruled that a Dutch judge could not contest the decrees of the occupying force on the basis of international law, in particular the 1907 regulation prescribed for a country at war. In this, the Supreme Court followed the advice of the barrister-general A. Rombach. The judgment concerned a case in which a man was sentenced by the economic judge for an "economic offence" (the purchase of pork without valid coupons). The counsel for the accused, P. Groeneboom, argued in his defense before the Supreme Court on 27 October 1941 that the judge had the authority to challenge the regulations of the occupying force on the basis of the regulation prescribed for a country at war, the decree of the Führer and the first regulation of the government commissioner. When the Supreme Court (in a judgment of 12 January 1942) denied the possibility of contesting rules issued by the German government, the Netherlands followed what was the rule in Germany and Italy too. On the basis of two emergency measures Hitler had the authority to issue incontestable rules, and the legal establishment acknowledged not it was not allowed to challenge "political" measures. "Political" in this case was what the political authorities considered to be political. In Italy the Court of Appeal recognized the free authority of Mussolini and the judge's lack of authority to control it. Meihuizen says about the Dutch test sentence: "A sentence with far-reaching consequences because with this, barristers were not given the chance to bring before the judge the question of the validity of legislation which had been issued by or on behalf of the occupier." The Supreme Court defended this sentence in retrospect with the conjecture that the Germans would never accept their decrees being contested and might have intervened in a negative way with the legal establishment, resulting in a further diminishing of citizens' legal protection.

In 1943, during the Second World War, the seat of the Supreme Court was temporarily moved from The Hague to Nijmegen. With the liberation of Nijmegen in September 1944, this led to a situation in which, although the seat was on liberated ground, most of the Justices found themselves still in occupied territory. After the war, there was not much done to clear matters; lawyers who had collaborated with the Germans generally kept their jobs or got important other positions. A crucial role in this affair was played by J. Donner, who became President of the Supreme Court in 1946.

=== Buildings ===
The court was located at a corner of the Binnenhof complex from 1838 until 1864, before moving to a building in the Plein, dubbed het hondenhok ("the doghouse"). The building was fully renovated in 1938 and finally demolished in 1988. At this point, the Supreme Court moved to the Huguetan house at 34–36 Lange Voorhout, the previous home of the Koninklijke Bibliotheek (Royal Library of the Netherlands). In March 2016 the court moved into a new building at Korte Voorhout 8.

== Authority ==
In the Netherlands a case is first heard by one of the ten district courts (rechtbanken). Afterwards, either side may appeal to one of the four courts of appeal (gerechtshoven). Finally, either party may file a cassation appeal to the Supreme Court.

== Composition ==
Justices of the Supreme Court are appointed by royal decree, chosen from a list of three, advised by the House of Representatives on the advice of the Court itself. The justices are, like every other judge in the Netherlands, appointed for life, until they retire at their own will or after reaching the age of 70. Upon reaching the age of 60, a justice may change status to extraordinary, with the effect that the justice no longer plays a full role at the Court.

The Supreme Court is divided into four chambers: the first or civil chamber, the second or criminal chamber, the third or tax chamber and the fourth or ombudsman chamber. The members of the fourth division are chosen ad hoc, but will include the President of the Court.

=== Current justices ===
As of April 2024, the first three chambers are composed as follows:
Name	Chamber	Invested	Born
Martijn Polak (Vice President)	Civil	2012	1961
Maarten Kroeze (Vice President)	Civil	2016	1970
Annemarie ter Heide	Civil	2020	-
Pieter Frans Lock	Civil	2019	-
Gijs Makkink	Civil	2021	1953
Edgar du Perron	Civil	2016	1965
Dineke de Groot (President)	Civil	2012	1965
Frits Salomons	Civil	2021	1962
Sierd Schaafsma	Civil	2021	1969
Carla Sieburgh	Civil	2017	1969
Tanja van den Broek	Civil	2014	1964
Karlijn Teuben	Civil	2022	1973
Hester Wattendorff	Civil	2018	1969
Vincent van den Brink (Vice President)	Criminal	2012	1966
Matthias Borgers (Vice President)	Criminal	2016	1979
Catelijne Caminada	Criminal	2020	-
Corinne Dalebout	Criminal	2023	1970
Tijs Kooijmans	Criminal	2021	1975
Ybo Buruma	Criminal	2011	1955
Martin Kuijer	Criminal	2020	-
Frits Posthumus	Criminal	2021	1962
Annelies Röttgering	Criminal	2018	-
Nastja van Strien	Criminal	2015	1961
Tamara Trotman	Criminal	2023	-
Maarten Feteris	Tax	2008	1960
Mariken van Hilten (Vice President)	Tax	2015	1964
Arjo van Eijsden (Vice President)	Tax	2020	1973
Marjan Boerlage	Tax	2017	1964
Peter Cools	Tax	2018	-
Liesbeth Punt	Tax	2005	1962
Eveline Fasse	Tax	2015	1958
Maarten Feteris	Tax	2013	1960
Marc Fierstra	Tax	2009	1959
Faustina Peters	Tax	2024	-
Jules Wortel	Tax	2012	1954
Alexander van der Voort Maarschalk	Tax	2022	-

== See also ==
- Judiciary of the Netherlands
- Law firms of the Netherlands
- List of presidents of the Supreme Court of the Netherlands
