= Josse Mertens de Wilmars =

Belgian jurist

- Born: Joseph Marie Honoré Charles Mertens de Wilmars; 22 June 1912; Sint-Niklaas, Belgium
- Died: 1 August 2002 (aged 90); Antwerp, Belgium
- Occupations: Lawyer; jurist
- Known for: President of the Court of Justice of the European Union

Baron Joseph (Josse) Marie Honoré Charles Mertens de Wilmars (22 June 1912 – 1 August 2002) was a Belgian jurist who became a member of the European Court of Justice and then its sixth President.

== Biography ==
Mertens de Wilmars was born in Sint-Niklaas, into a family of brewers. One of his brothers was the psychiatrist Charles Mertens de Wilmars. He gained a degree in law in 1934, and practiced in Antwerp, specialising in administrative law. He was an officer in the Belgian Army in the Second World War, and spent most of the war as a prisoner of war. After the war, he was a member of the Belgian Catholic alliance, and was a member of the Belgian parliament from 1951 to 1962. He was in favour of European unity, and attended the Congress in the Hague in 1948. He also taught administrative law at the High Institute for Administrative Sciences in Antwerp from 1946 to 1967, and was an associate professor in law at the Catholic University of Leuven from 1971.

He became a member of the European Court of Justice in 1967, and served as its sixth President from 1980 to 1984.

He died in Antwerp.

== See also ==
- List of members of the European Court of Justice

Legal offices
Preceded by Hans Kutscher	President of the European Court of Justice; 1980–1984	Succeeded by Alexander Mackenzie Stuart
