= André Donner =

Dutch jurist

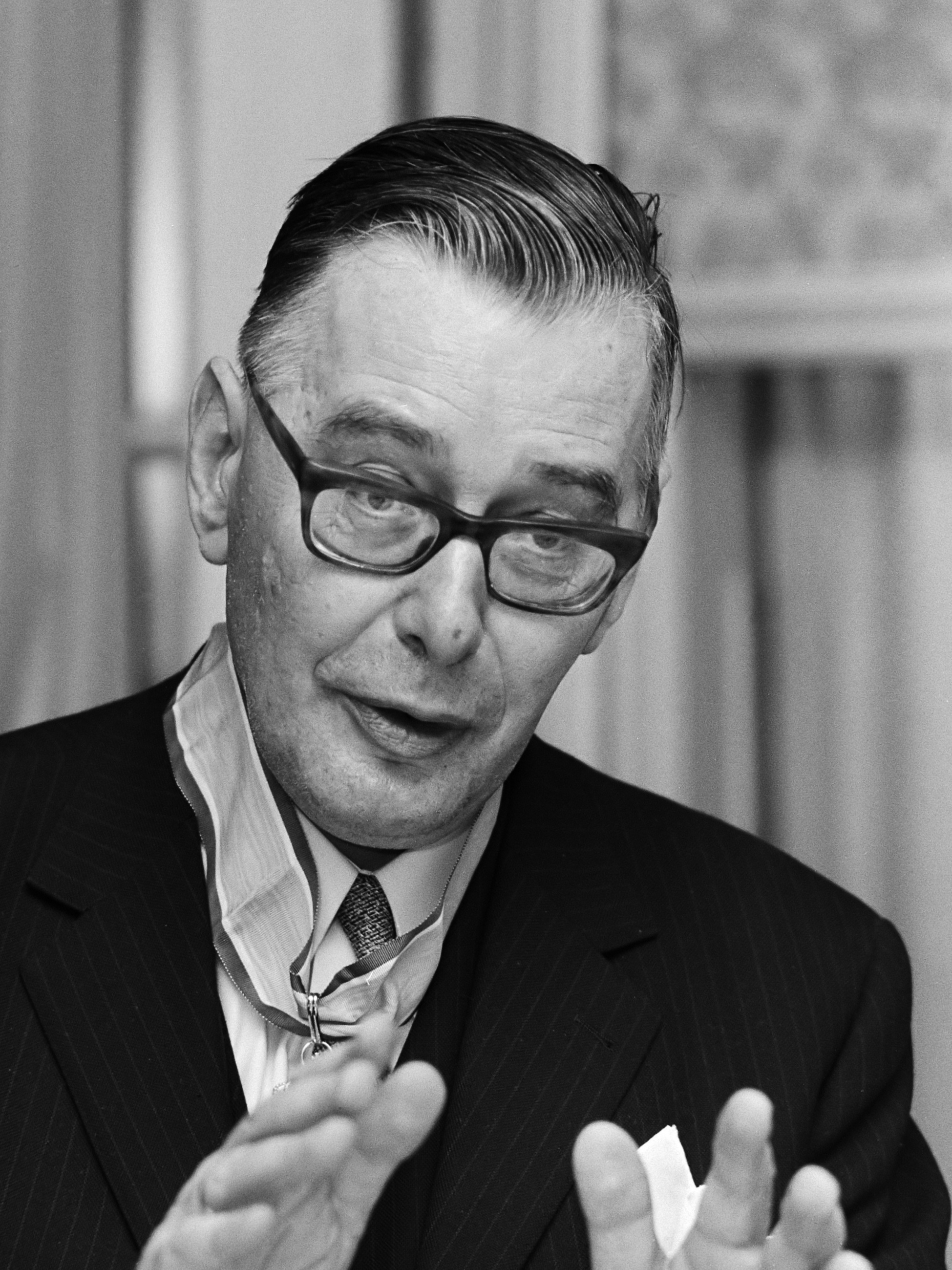
- André Donner in 1971

Judge of the European Court of Human Rights
- In office 1986–1987
- Preceded by: Gerard Wiarda
- Succeeded by: Siep Martens

President of the European Court of Justice
- In office 1958–1964
- Preceded by: Massimo Pilotti
- Succeeded by: Charles Léon Hammes

Judge of the European Court of Justice
- In office 1958–1979
- Preceded by: Adrianus van Kleffens
- Succeeded by: Thijmen Koopmans

Personal details
- Born: Andreas Matthias Donner; 15 January 1918 Rotterdam
- Died: 24 August 1992 (aged 74) Amersfoort
- Party: Anti-Revolutionary Party
- Children: Piet Hein Donner
- Parent: Jan Donner (father)
- Relatives: Jan Hein Donner (brother)

Academic background
- Education: Vrije Universiteit Amsterdam (LLM, PhD)
- Thesis: De rechtskracht van administratieve beschikkingen (1941)
- Doctoral advisor: Victor Rutgers

Academic work
- Discipline: Constitutional law, administrative law and European law
- Institutions: Vrije Universiteit Amsterdam; University of Groningen
- Notable works: Van der Pot. Handboek van het Nederlandse staatsrecht

Andreas Matthias Donner (15 June 1918 in Rotterdam – 24 August 1992 in Amersfoort) was a Dutch judge and the second President of the European Court of Justice, a position which he served between 1958 and 1964.

== Early life ==
Donner stems from a prominent Dutch Reformed family of jurists. His father Jan Donner and his son Piet Hein Donner were Dutch Minister of Justice, with his son also being the current Dutch Vice President of the Council of State. André Donner's brother Jan Hein Donner was a chess grandmaster.

André Donner studied law at the Vrije Universiteit Amsterdam, where he graduated at the age of 21 years old. He obtained his doctorate at the same university with a thesis named "De rechtskracht van administratieve beschikkingen".

In 1955, Donner became member of the Royal Netherlands Academy of Arts and Sciences, four years later he became foreign member.

The Van Gend en Loos v Nederlandse Administratie der Belastingen case was issued during his term as President of the European Court of Justice.

== See also ==
- List of members of the European Court of Justice

Legal offices
Preceded by Massimo Pilotti	President of the European Court of Justice; 1958–1964	Succeeded by Charles Léon Hammes
