= Hans Kutscher =

German judge (1911–1993)

Justice of the Federal Constitutional Court of Germany (first senate)
- In office 12 October 1955 – 31 August 1956

Justice of the Federal Constitutional Court of Germany (second senate)
- In office 1 September 1956 – 25 October 1970 (on leave from 26 October 1970 until 31 August 1971)

Personal details
- Born: 14 December 1911 Hamburg
- Died: 24 August 1993 (aged 81). Bad Herrenalb

Hans Kutscher (14 December 1911 – 24 August 1993) was a member of the first and second Senates of the German Federal Constitutional Court and later a member and then President of the European Court of Justice.

== Early life ==
Kutscher was elected by the Bundesrat to serve on the Federal Constitutional Court. He served as a member of the first senate from 12 October 1955 to 31 August 1956, when this Senate was dissolved because the number of judges was reduced from twelve to ten. He was re-elected a member of the second senate from 1 September 1956, and re-elected in 1963, serving until 31 August 1971.

He joined the European Court of Justice in 1970, serving as its fifth President between 1976 and 1980.

== See also ==
- List of members of the European Court of Justice

Legal offices
Preceded by Robert Lecourt	President of the European Court of Justice; 1976–1980	Succeeded by Josse Mertens de Wilmars
