= Robert Lecourt =

French politician (1908–2004)

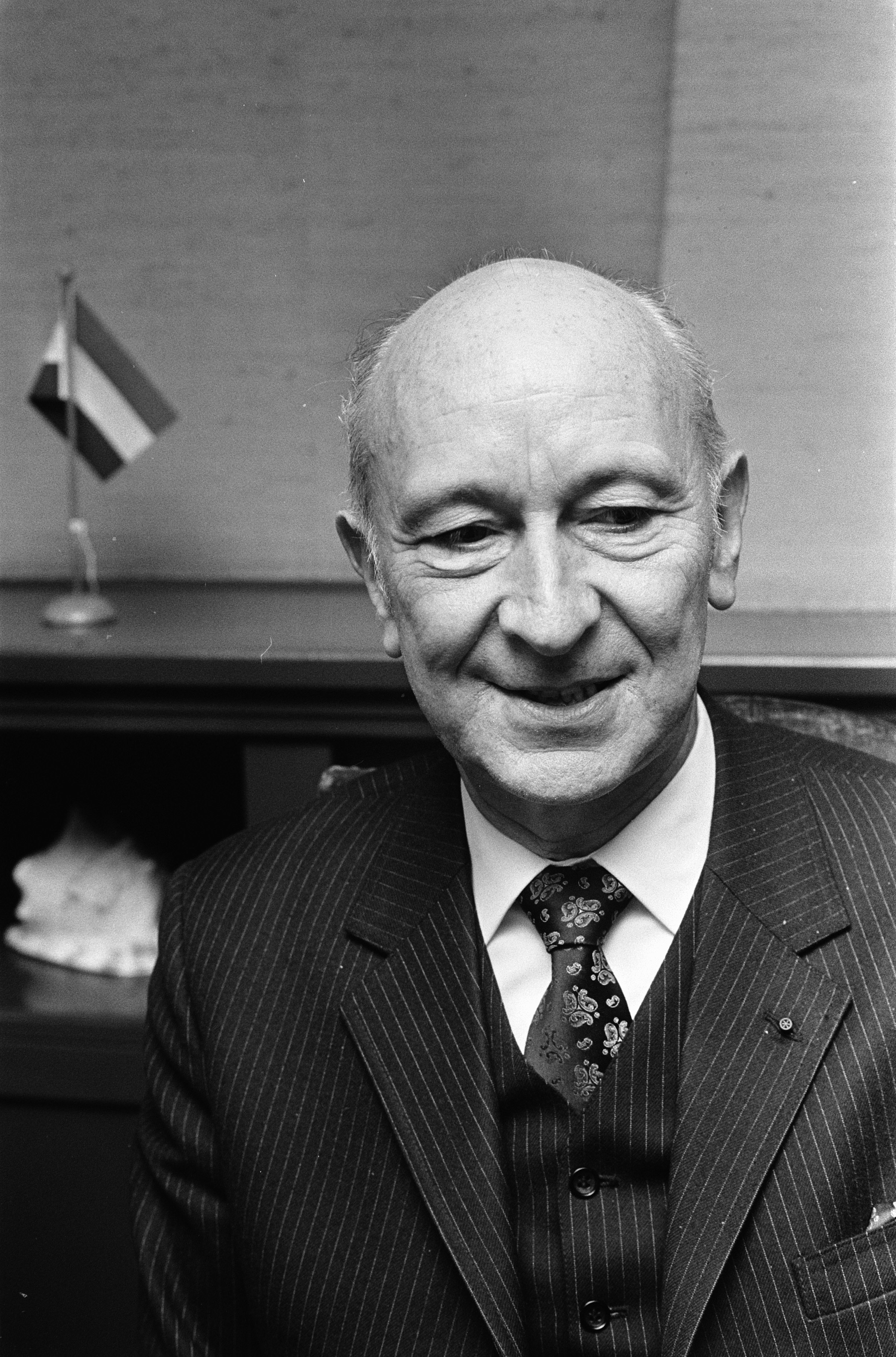
- Lecourt in 1970

President of the Court of Justice of the European Union
- In office 1967–1976
- Preceded by: Charles Léon Hammes
- Succeeded by: Hans Kutscher

Judge of the Court of Justice of the European Union
- In office 1962–1976

Minister of Justice
- In office 14 May 1958 – 1 June 1958
- Prime Minister: Pierre Pflimlin
- In office 6 November 1957 – 14 May 1958
- Prime Minister: Félix Gaillard
- In office 13 February 1949 – 28 October 1949
- Prime Minister: Henri Queuille
- In office 5 September 1948 – 11 September 1948
- Prime Minister: Robert Schuman
- In office 26 July 1947 – 5 September 1947
- Prime Minister: André Marie

Personal details
- Born: 19 September 1908 Pavilly, Seine-Maritime, France
- Died: 9 August 2004 (aged 95) Boulogne-Billancourt, France
- Party: Popular Republican Movement (MRP)
- Education: University of Rouen Normandy
- Profession: Lawyer; judge; politician

Robert Lecourt (19 September 1908 – 9 August 2004) was a French politician and lawyer, judge and the fourth President of the European Court of Justice.

Significantly, in his role as a judge at European Court of Justice, he gave the landmark decision in the case of Costa v ENEL, establishing the supremacy of EU law over the law of member states.

== Early life and education ==
Lecourt was born on 19 September 1908 in Pavilly.

After studying at the Jean-Baptiste-de-La-Salle college in Rouen, he studied law at the University of Rouen and became a lawyer in Rouen and at the Court of Appeal of Paris in 1932.

== Career ==
He was president of the Youth People's Democratic Party in 1936, and a lieutenant at the Fort de Saint-Cyr in 1939, whereafter he became actively involved in the French Resistance and a member of the steering committee of the Resistance movement.

In 1958, he was elected in the first constituency of the Hautes-Alpes. A member of two national constituent assemblies, he was elected from the MRP in the Seine district, and retained his mandate during the three legislatures of the Fourth Republic. He chaired the MRP group in the French National Assembly, and was also a member of the Association of MRP until his death.

In January 1958, as Minister of Justice in the government of Felix Gaillard, Lecourt proposed various reforms to the French Constitution. In modified form, the famous Article 49-3 of France's 1958 Constitution is largely derived from his constitutional vision.

After leaving the French government in 1961, Lecourt served as judge on the European Court of Justice from 1962 to 1976, and as President of the Court from 1967 to 1976. In the fourteen years he spent in Luxembourg as a European judge, Lecourt had a major impact on the jurisprudence of the Court of Justice of the European Communities. In 1964, he was rapporteur in the famous Costa v. ENEL case, in which the Court of Justice ruled that European law had primacy over national law. Lecourt was convinced that this was a necessity for the Court of Justice, and that the European judges had an active role to play in the creation of an ‘ever closer union among the peoples of Europe’. They did have to convince national courts to collaborate.

Soon after his election as president of the court, Lecourt developed a communication strategy to convince national judges of the benefits of the preliminary ruling mechanism, a procedure through which they could ask the European judges questions regarding the interpretation of the European Treaties.

After his retirement from the Court, Lecourt published "L'Europe des Juges" (Bruylant, 1976), an account of the major decisions and principles of European law, targeted at national lawyers and judges.

== Death ==
He died on 9 August 2004 in Boulogne-Billancourt.

== Government roles ==
- Minister of Justice of the government of André Marie (from July 26 to 5 September 1948)
- Minister of Justice of the government of Robert Schuman (Popular Republican Movement, 5 to 11 September 1948)
- Vice-chairman, Minister of Justice of the government of Henri Queuille (13 February 1949 to 28 October 1949)
- Minister of Justice of the government of Felix Gaillard (6 November 1957 the 14 May 1958)
- Minister of Justice of the Government of Pierre Pflimlin (May 14 to 1 June 1958)
- With the special award of the constitutional reform
- Minister of State of the government of Michel Debré (January 8 to 27 March 1959)
- Minister of State, responsible for cooperation with African States and Madagascar, in the government of Michel Debré (27 March 1959 to 5 February 1960)
- Minister of State in charge of the Sahara, and Overseas Departments and Territories, in the government of Michel Debré (5 February 1960 to 24 August 1961)

== See also ==
- List of members of the European Court of Justice

== Sources ==
- Former Members, European Court of Justice official website.

Legal offices
Preceded by Charles Léon Hammes	President of the European Court of Justice; 1967–1976	Succeeded by Hans Kutscher
Political offices
Preceded by André Marie	Minister of Justice of France; 26 June 1948 – 11 September 1948	Succeeded by André Marie
Preceded by André Marie	Minister of Justice of France; 13 February 1949 – 28 October 1949	Succeeded by René Mayer
Preceded by Édouard Corniglion-Molinier	Minister of Justice of France; 6 November 1957 – 1 June 1958	Succeeded by Michel Debré
