= European Court of Justice =

Supreme court in the European Union, part of the Court of Justice of the European Union

Coordinates: 49°37′17″N 06°08′28″E

Court of Justice of the European Union
- Emblem of the Court of Justice of the European Union

- Court of Justice headquarters
- Interactive map of Court of Justice of the European Union
- Established: 1952
- Jurisdiction: European Union and Northern Ireland (Note: Under the terms of the Protocol on Ireland/Northern Ireland, concluded as part of the Brexit withdrawal agreement, the CJEU — and hence the ECJ — continues to have jurisdiction over the operation of EU law applying to Northern Ireland in relation to customs and the movement of goods, technical regulations, VAT and excise, the Single Electricity Market and State aid, and may hear applications for preliminary rulings made by Northern Irish courts.)
- Location: Palais de la Cour de Justice, Kirchberg, Luxembourg City, Luxembourg
- Composition method: Appointed by the representatives of the governments of the member states
- Authorised by: Treaties of the European Union
- Appeals from: General Court (European Union)
- Number of positions: 27 judges (1 per member state); 11 advocates-general
- Website: curia.europa.eu

President
- Currently: Koen Lenaerts
- Since: 8 October 2015

Vice-President
- Currently: Thomas von Danwitz
- Since: 8 October 2024

Registrar
- Currently: Vittorio Di Bucci
- Since: 8 October 2026

Division map

The European Court of Justice (ECJ), officially the Court of Justice (French: Cour de Justice), is the supreme court of the European Union (EU) in matters of European Union law. As a part of the Court of Justice of the European Union, it is tasked with interpreting EU law and ensuring its uniform application across all EU member states under Article 263 of the Treaty of the Functioning of the European Union (TFEU).

The Court was established in 1952, and is based in Luxembourg. It is composed of one judge per member state – currently 27 – although it normally hears cases in panels of three, five or fifteen judges. The Court has been led by President Koen Lenaerts since 2015.

The ECJ is the highest court of the European Union in matters of Union law, but not national law. It is not possible to appeal against the decisions of national courts in the ECJ, but rather national courts refer questions of EU law to the ECJ. However, it is ultimately for the national court to apply the resulting interpretation to the facts of any given case, although only courts of final appeal are bound to refer a question of EU law when one is addressed. The treaties give the ECJ the power for consistent application of EU law across the EU as a whole.

The court also acts as an administrative and constitutional court between the other EU institutions and the member states and can annul or invalidate unlawful acts of EU institutions, bodies, offices and agencies.

== History ==
The court was established in 1952, by the Treaty of Paris (1951) as part of the European Coal and Steel Community. It was established with seven judges, allowing both representation of each of the six member states and being an odd number of judges in case of a tie. One judge was appointed from each member state and the seventh seat rotated between the "large Member States" (West Germany, France and Italy). It became an institution of two additional Communities in 1957 when the European Economic Community (EEC), and the European Atomic Energy Community (Euratom) were created, sharing the same courts with the European Coal and Steel Community.

The Maastricht Treaty was ratified in 1993, and created the European Union. The name of the Court did not change unlike the other institutions. The power of the Court resided in the Community pillar (the first pillar).

The Court gained power in 1997, with the signing of the Amsterdam Treaty. Issues from the third pillar were transferred to the first pillar. Previously, these issues were settled between the member states.

Following the entrance into force of the Treaty of Lisbon on 1 December 2009, the ECJ's official name was changed from the "Court of Justice of the European Communities" to the "Court of Justice" although in English it is still most common to refer to the Court as the European Court of Justice. The Court of First Instance was renamed as the "General Court", and the term "Court of Justice of the European Union" now officially designates the two courts, as along with its specialised tribunals, taken together.

== Composition ==
=== Judges ===
The Court of Justice consists of 27 Judges who are assisted by 11 advocates-general. The judges and advocates-general are appointed by common accord of the governments of the member states and hold office for a renewable term of six years. The treaties require that they are chosen from legal experts whose independence is "beyond doubt" and who possess the qualifications required for appointment to the highest judicial offices in their respective countries or who are of recognised competence. In practice, each member state nominates a judge whose nomination is then ratified by all other member states.

=== President ===
The president of the Court of Justice is elected from and by the judges for a renewable term of three years. The president presides over hearings and deliberations, directing both judicial business and administration (for example, the time table of the Court and Grand Chamber). He also assigns cases to the chambers for examination and appoints judge as rapporteurs called Judge-Rapporteur (reporting judges). The Council may also appoint assistant rapporteurs to assist the president in applications for interim measures and to assist rapporteurs in the performance of their duties.

No.	President	State	Term
1	Massimo Pilotti	Italy	1952–1958
2	Andreas Matthias Donner	Netherlands	1958–1964
3	Charles Léon Hammes	Luxembourg	1964–1967
4	Robert Lecourt	France	1967–1976
5	Hans Kutscher	West Germany	1976–1980
6	Josse Mertens de Wilmars	Belgium	1980–1984
7	John Mackenzie-Stuart	United Kingdom	1984–1988
8	Ole Due	Denmark	1988–1994
9	Gil Carlos Rodríguez Iglesias	Spain	1994–2003
10	Vassilios Skouris	Greece	2003–2015
11	Koen Lenaerts	Belgium	2015–present

=== Vice-President ===
The post of vice-president was created by amendments to the Statute of the Court of Justice in 2012. The duty of the vice-president is to assist the president in the performance of his duties and to take the president's place when the latter is prevented from attending or when the office of president is vacant. In 2012, judge Koen Lenaerts from Belgium became the first judge to carry out the duties of the vice-president of the Court of Justice. Like the president of the Court of Justice, the vice-president is elected by the members of the Court for a term of three years.

No.	Vice-President	State	Term
1	Koen Lenaerts	Belgium	2012–2015
2	Antonio Tizzano	Italy	2015–2018
3	Rosario Silva de Lapuerta	Spain	2018–2021
4	Lars Bay Larsen	Denmark	2021–2024
5	Thomas von Danwitz	Germany	2024–present

=== Advocates general ===
The judges are assisted by eleven advocates general, whose number may be increased by the Council if the Court so requests. The advocates general are responsible for presenting a legal opinion on the cases assigned to them. They can question the parties involved and then give their opinion on a legal solution to the case before the judges deliberate and deliver their judgment. The intention behind having advocates general attached is to provide independent and impartial opinions concerning the Court's cases. Unlike the Court's judgments, the written opinions of the advocates general are the works of a single author and so they are generally more readable and deal with the legal issues more comprehensively than the Court, which is limited to the particular matters at hand.

The opinions of the advocates general are advisory and do not bind the Court, but they are nonetheless very influential and are followed in the majority of cases. In a 2016 study, Arrebola and Mauricio measured the influence of the advocate general on the judgments of the Court, showing that the Court is approximately 67% more likely to deliver a particular outcome if that was the opinion of the advocate general. As of 2003, advocates general are only required to give an opinion if the Court considers the case raises a new point of law.

According to Article 255 TFEU the judges and advocates-general are appointed by common accord of the governments of the member states after consultation of a panel responsible for assessing candidates’ suitability.

=== The registrar ===
The registrar is the Court's chief administrator. They manage departments under the authority of the Court's president. The Court may also appoint one or more Assistant Registrars. They help the Court, the Chambers, the president and the judges in all their official functions. They are responsible for the Registry as well as for the receipt, transmission and custody of documents and pleadings that have been entered in a register initialled by the president. They are Guardian of the Seals and responsible for the Court's archives and publications.

The registrar is responsible for the administration of the Court, its financial management and its accounts. The operation of the Court is in the hands of officials and other servants who are responsible to the registrar under the authority of the president. The Court administers its own infrastructure; this includes the Translation Directorate, which, as of 2012 employed 44.7% of the staff of the institution.

=== Chambers ===
The Court can sit in plenary session, as a Grand Chamber of fifteen judges (including the president and vice-president), or in chambers of three or five judges. Plenary sittings are now very rare, and the court mostly sits in chambers of three or five judges. Each chamber elects its own president who is elected for a term of three years in the case of the five-judge chambers or one year in the case of three-judge chambers.

The Court is required to sit in full court in exceptional cases provided for in the treaties. The court may also decide to sit in full, if the issues raised are considered to be of exceptional importance. Sitting as a Grand Chamber is more common and can happen when a member state or a Union institution, that is a party to certain proceedings, so requests, or in particularly complex or important cases. The main added value of using the full Court or Grand Chamber lies in enhancing the legitimacy of the ECJ’s rulings by ensuring that they reflect the collective view of all—or at least the majority—of the Court’s judges.

The court acts as a collegial body: decisions are those of the court rather than of individual judges; no minority opinions are given and indeed the existence of a majority decision rather than unanimity is never suggested.

== Jurisdiction and powers ==
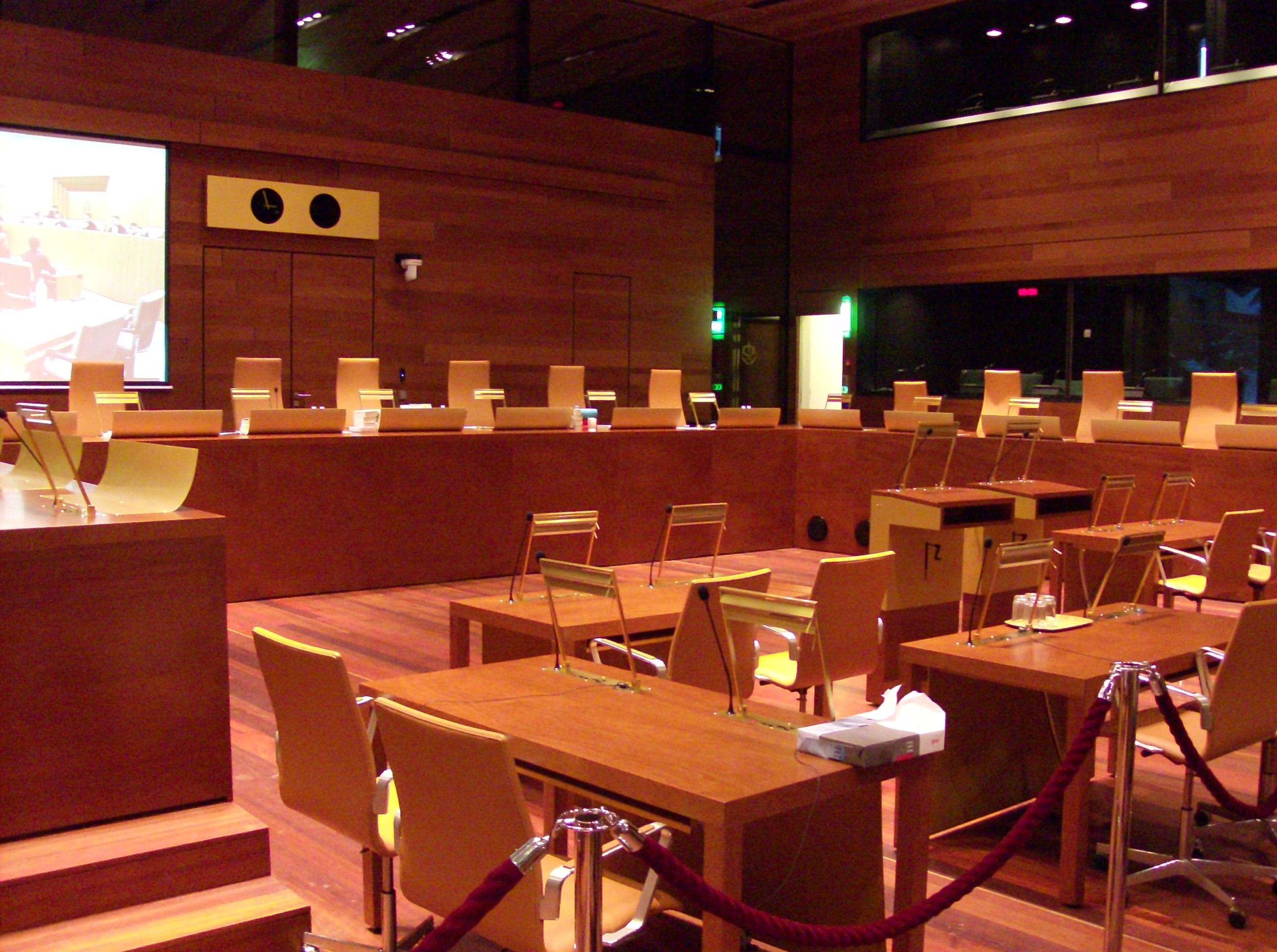
Medium court room in the Ancien Palais building of the Palais de la Cour de Justice complex

It is the responsibility of the Court of Justice to ensure that the law is observed in the interpretation and application of the Treaties of the European Union. To enable it to carry out its duties, the Court has broad jurisdiction to hear various types of action. The Court has competence to, amongst other actions, rule on applications for annulment or actions for failure to act brought by a Member State or an institution; take actions against Member States for failure to fulfil obligations; and hear references for a preliminary ruling and appeals against decisions of the General Court.

=== Actions for failure to fulfil obligations: infringement procedure ===
Under Article 258 (ex Article 226) of the Treaty on the Functioning of the European Union, the Court of Justice may determine whether a Member State has fulfilled its obligations under Union law.

That action may be brought by the commission – as is practically always the case – or by another member state, although the cases of the latter kind remain extremely rare. Only six interstate cases have been decided by the court:

- France v. United Kingdom (case C-141/78), judgement of 14 October 1979 (ECLI:EU:C:1979:225) on a British unilateral fishery protection measure, infringement because UK had to consult and seek approval of commission
- Belgium v. Spain (case C-388/95), judgement of 16 May 2000 (ECLI:EU:C:2000:244) on a Spanish regulation ordering wine to be bottled in the region of production if it is using the designation of origin, no infringement because it is an authorised and justifiable restriction on the free movement of goods
- Spain v. United Kingdom (case C-145/04), judgement of 12 September 2006 (ECLI:EU:C:2006:543) on Commonwealth voting rights in Gibraltar, no infringement
- Hungary v. Slovakia (case C-364/10), judgement of 16 October 2012 (ECLI:EU:C:2012:630): Slovakia denies entry to Hungarian president, no infringement
- Austria v. Germany (case C-591/17), judgement of 18 June 2019 (ECLI:EU:C:2019:504) on the discriminatory German tax relief on the motor vehicle tax; infringement.
- Slovenia v. Croatia (case C-457/18), judgement of 31 January 2020 (ECLI:EU:C:2020:65) on their border dispute.

The commencement of proceedings before the Court of Justice is preceded by a preliminary procedure conducted by the commission, which gives the Member State the opportunity to reply to the complaints against it. The court has decided that if the European Commission does not send the formal letter to the violating member state no-one can force them. If that procedure does not result in termination of the failure by the Member State, an action for breach of Union law may be brought before the Court of Justice.

If the Court finds that an obligation has not been fulfilled, the Member State concerned must terminate the breach without delay. If, after new proceedings are initiated by the commission, the Court of Justice finds that the Member State concerned has not complied with its judgment, it may, upon the request of the commission, impose on the Member State a fixed or a periodic financial penalty under Article 260 of the TFEU.

=== Actions for annulment ===
By an action for annulment under Article 263 (ex Article 230) of the Treaty on the Functioning of the European Union, the applicant seeks the annulment of a measure (regulation, directive, decision or any measure with legal effects) adopted by an institution, body, office or agency of the EU. As a rule of thumb, the Court of Justice has jurisdiction over actions brought by the institutions or a member state against legislative measures. The General Court, on the other hand, hears cases concerning executive decisions and, most notably, cases brought by individuals. The details of which cases are reserved for the Court of Justice are laid down in Article 51 of the Court's statute. If an action for annulment is successful, the Court of Justice has the power to declare the attacked measure void under Article 264 (ex Article 231) of the Treaty on the Functioning of the European Union.

=== Actions for failure to act ===
Under Article 265 (ex Article 232) of the Treaty on the Functioning of the European Union, the Court of Justice and the General Court may also review the legality of a failure to act on the part of a Union institution, body, office or agency. However, such an action may be brought only after the institution has been called on to act. Where the failure to act is held to be unlawful, it is for the institution concerned to put an end to the failure by appropriate measures.

=== Application for compensation based on non-contractual liability ===
Under Article 268 of the Treaty on the Functioning of the European Union (and with reference to Article 340), the Court of Justice hears claims for compensation based on non-contractual liability, and rules on the liability of the Union for damage to citizens and to undertakings caused by its institutions or servants in the performance of their duties.

=== Appeals on points of law ===
Under Article 256 (ex Article 225) of the Treaty on the Functioning of the European Union, appeals on judgments given by the General Court may be heard by the Court of Justice only if the appeal is on a point of law. If the appeal is admissible and well founded, the Court of Justice sets aside the judgment of the General Court. Where the state of the proceedings so permits, the Court may itself decide the case. Otherwise, the Court must refer the case back to the General Court, which is bound by the decision given on appeal. No special procedure applies to allow for an appeal to proceed to the Court of Justice, except for cases which the General Court ruled on appeal against decisions of the independent Boards of Appeal of the EU agencies (as provided by Article 58a of the Statute of the Court).

=== References for a preliminary ruling ===
References for a preliminary ruling are specific to Union law. Whilst the Court of Justice is, by its very nature, the supreme guardian of Union legality, it is not the only judicial body empowered to apply EU law.

That task also falls to national courts, in as much as they retain jurisdiction to review the administrative implementation of Union law, for which the authorities of the member states are essentially responsible; many provisions of the Treaties and of secondary legislation – regulations, directives and decisions – directly confer individual rights on nationals of member states, which national courts must uphold.

National courts are thus by their nature the first guarantors of Union law. To ensure the effective and uniform application of Union legislation and to prevent divergent interpretations, national courts may, and sometimes must, turn to the Court of Justice and ask that it clarify a point concerning the interpretation of Union law, in order, for example, to ascertain whether their national legislation complies with that law. Petitions to the Court of Justice for a preliminary ruling are described in Article 267 (ex Article 234) of the Treaty on the Functioning of the European Union.

A reference for a preliminary ruling may also seek review of the legality of an act of Union law. The Court of Justice's reply is not merely an opinion, but takes the form of a judgment or a reasoned order. The national court to which that is addressed is bound by the interpretation given. The Court's judgment also binds other national courts before which a problem of the same nature is raised.

Although such a reference may be made only by a national court, which alone has the power to decide that it is appropriate do so, all the parties involved – that is to say, the Member States, the parties in the proceedings before national courts and, in particular, the commission – may take part in proceedings before the Court of Justice. In this way, a number of important principles of Union law have been laid down in preliminary rulings, sometimes in answer to questions referred by national courts of first instance.

Rulings end with a dictum which summarises the decision which the Court has made and may direct how costs are to be managed.

In the ECJ's 2009 report it was noted that Belgian, German and Italian judges made the most referrals for an interpretation of EU law to the ECJ. However, the German Constitutional Court has rarely turned to the European Court of Justice, which is why lawyers and law professors warn about a future judicial conflict between the two courts. On 7 February 2014, the German Constitutional Court referred its first case to the ECJ for a ruling on a European Central Bank program. In 2017 the German Constitutional Court referred its second case to the ECJ but contrary to the binding nature of the Court of Justice's preliminary rulings, the German Constitutional Court in 2020 refused to abide by the preliminary ruling. According to the German Constitutional Court, the Court of Justice's answer was unintelligible. In June 2021, the European Commission announced it would start infringement proceedings against Germany for the German Constitutional Court's refusal to abide by the Court of Justice's preliminary ruling.

The constitutional courts of the member-states have in general been reluctant to refer a question to the European Court of Justice.

==== Dates of first references by national constitutional courts ====
These are the first references by each constitutional court:

- 1997: Constitutional Court of Belgium: case C-93/97, Fédération Belge des Chambres Syndicales de Médecins ASBL
- 1999: Constitutional Court of Austria: case C-143/99, Adria-Wien Pipeline GmbH
- 2007: Constitutional Court of Lithuania: case C-239/07, Sabatauskas
- 2008: Constitutional Court of Italy: case C-169/08, Presidente del Consiglio dei Ministri v. Regione Sardegna
- 2011: Constitutional Court of Spain: case C-399/11, Melloni
- 2013: Constitutional Council of France: case C-168/13 PPU, Jeremy
- 2014: Constitutional Court of Germany: case C-62/14, Gauweiler
- 2014: Constitutional Court of Slovenia: case C-526/14, Kotnik
- 2015: Constitutional Court of Luxembourg: case C-321/15, ArcelorMittal Rodange et Schifflange SA
- 2015: Constitutional Court of Poland: case C-390/15, Polish Ombudsman
- 2016: Constitutional Court of Romania: case C-673/16, Coman
- 2017: Constitutional Court of Latvia: case C‑120/17, Ministru kabinets
- 2019: Constitutional Court of Slovakia: case C-378/19, Prezident Slovenskej republiky
- 2025: Constitutional Court of Croatia: case C-506/25, Raukar-Gamulin and Others

== Procedure and working languages ==
Procedure before the ECJ is determined by its own rules of procedure. As a rule the Court's procedure includes a written phase and an oral phase. The proceedings are conducted in one of the official languages of the European Union chosen by the applicant, although where the defendant is a member state or a national of a member state the applicant must choose an official language of that member state, unless the parties agree otherwise.

However, the working language of the court is the language of the case being heard with French being the common language for discussion, and it is in this language that the judges deliberate, pleadings and written legal submissions are translated and in which the judgment is drafted. The advocates-general, by contrast, may work and draft their opinions in any official language, as they do not take part in any deliberations. These opinions are then translated into French for the benefit of the judges and their deliberations. However, all documents used in the case are in the language of that case and the only authentic version of the judgment handed down by either the Court of Justice or the General Court is that which appears in the language of the case.

== Seat ==
All the EU's judicial bodies are based in the Kirchberg quarter of Luxembourg City, Luxembourg. The Court of Justice is seated in the Palais de la Cour de Justice.

Luxembourg City was chosen as the provisional seat of the Court on 23 July 1952 with the establishment of the European Coal and Steel Community. Its first hearing there was held on 28 November 1954 in a building known as Villa Vauban, the seat until 1959 when it would move to the Côte d'Eich building and then to the Palais building in 1972.

In 1965, the member states established Luxembourg City as the permanent seat of the Court. Future judicial bodies (Court of First Instance and Civil Service Tribunal) would also be based in the city. The decision was confirmed by the European Council at Edinburgh in 1992. However, there was no reference to future bodies being in Luxembourg City. In reaction to this, the Luxembourg government issued its own declaration stating it did not surrender those provisions agreed upon in 1965. The Edinburgh decision was attached to the Amsterdam Treaty. With the Treaty of Nice Luxembourg attached a declaration stating it did not claim the seat of the Boards of Appeal of the Office for Harmonisation in the Internal Market – even if it were to become a judicial body.

== Landmark decisions ==
Over time ECJ developed two essential rules on which the legal order rests: direct effect and primacy. The court first ruled on the direct effect of primary legislation in a case that, though technical and tedious, raised a fundamental principle of Union law. In Van Gend en Loos v Nederlandse Administratie der Belastingen (1963), a Dutch transport firm brought a complaint against Dutch customs for increasing the duty on a product imported from Germany. The court ruled that the Community constitutes a new legal order, the subjects of which consist of not only the Member States but also their nationals. Consequently Community law may, if appropriately framed, confer rights on individuals which national courts are bound to protect. The principle of direct effect would have had little impact if Union law did not supersede national law. Without supremacy the Member States could simply ignore EU rules. In Costa v ENEL (1964), the court ruled that member states had definitively transferred sovereign rights to the Community and Union law could not be overridden by domestic law.

Another early landmark case was Commission v Luxembourg and Belgium (1964), the "Dairy Products" case. In that decision the Court comprehensively ruled out any use by the Member States of the retaliatory measures commonly permitted by general international law within the European Economic Community. That decision is often thought to be the best example of the European legal order's divergence with ordinary international law. Commission v Luxembourg and Belgium also has a logical connection with the nearly contemporaneous Van Gend en Loos and Costa v ENEL decisions, as arguably it is the doctrines of direct effect and supremacy that allow the European legal system to forgo any use of retaliatory enforcement mechanisms by the Member States. Links between the direct effect doctrine and the suppression of inter-state retaliation between the EU member states can be found in many of the landmark early decisions of the European Court of Justice, and in the writings of the influential French judge, Robert Lecourt, perhaps the most important member of the Court between 1962 and 1976.

Further, in the 1991 case Francovich v Italy, the ECJ established that Member States could be liable to pay compensation to individuals who suffered a loss by reason of the Member State's failure to transpose an EU directive into national law.

== Criticism ==
In 2008, the former German president Roman Herzog claimed that the ECJ was overstepping its powers. He was particularly critical of the court's judgment Mangold v Helm, which over-ruled a German law that would discriminate against older workers.

In 2011, the president of the Constitutional Court of Belgium, Marc Bossuyt, said that both the Court of Justice of the European Union and the European Court of Human Rights were taking on more powers by extending their competences, creating a threat of a "government by judges". He claimed that foreign judges were not always aware of the financial implications of their judgements on national governments.

== See also ==
- Court of Justice of the European Union
- European Court of Human Rights
- EFTA Court
- General Court (European Union)
- List of European Court of Justice rulings
- European Union and the European Convention on Human Rights
