= List of anti-discrimination acts =

This is a list of anti-discrimination acts (often called discrimination acts or anti-discrimination laws), which are laws designed to prevent discrimination.

== Australia ==
- Anti-discrimination laws in Australia
  - Age Discrimination Act 2004
  - Anti-Discrimination Act 1991 (Queensland)
  - Anti-Discrimination Act 1977 (New South Wales)
  - Australian Human Rights Commission Act 1986
  - Charter of Human Rights and Responsibilities Act 2006 (Victoria)
  - Disability Discrimination Act 1992
  - Human Rights Act 2004 (Australian Capital Territory)
  - Racial and Religious Tolerance Act 2001 (Victoria)
  - Racial Discrimination Act 1975
  - Sex Discrimination Act 1984

== Bolivia ==
- Law Against Racism and All Forms of Discrimination 2010

== Brazil ==
- Anti-discrimination laws in Brazil

== Canada ==
- Canadian Charter of Rights and Freedoms 1982
- Canadian Employment Equity Act 1986
- Canadian Human Rights Act 1977
- Ontarians with Disabilities Act 2002
- Quebec Charter of Human Rights and Freedoms 1976
- Canadian Multiculturalism Act 1971
- BC Human Rights Code 1996, first version enacted in 1979
- Bill C-16 Bill C-16 Finalized 2017, this enactment amends the Canadian Human Rights Act to add gender identity and gender expression to the list of prohibited grounds of discrimination.

== Colombia ==
- Law 1482 against discrimination, 2011.

== European Union ==
- The Fundamental Freedoms
- Charter of Fundamental Rights of the European Union whose Article 21 prohibits all discrimination including on basis of disability, age and sexual orientation
- Directive 76/207/EEC on the implementation of the principle of equal treatment for men and women as regards access to employment, vocational training and promotion, and working conditions
- Directive 2000/43/EC on Anti-discrimination
- Directive 2004/113/EC implementing the principle of equal treatment between men and women in the access to and supply of goods and services
- Directive 2006/54/EC on the implementation of the principle of equal opportunities and equal treatment of men and women in matters of employment and occupation

== France ==
- Edict of Nantes 1598
- 1789, Article 1 from Declaration of the Rights of Man and of the Citizen

== Germany ==
- General Equal Treatment Act of 2006

== Hong Kong ==
- Disability Discrimination Ordinance
- Family Status Discrimination Ordinance
- Hong Kong Bill of Rights Ordinance
- Race Discrimination Ordinance
- Sex Discrimination Ordinance

== India ==
- Article 14, 15, 16, 17 and 18 of Constitution of India
- Equal Remuneration Act, 1976 - Guarantees equal pay for equal work to men and women.
- Indian Penal Code, 1860 (Section 153 A) - Criminalises the use of language that promotes discrimination or violence against people on the basis of race, caste, sex, place of birth, religion, gender identity, sexual orientation or any other category.
- Mental Healthcare Act, 2017 - Prohibits the denial or refusal to access mental healthcare facilities or services for people on the basis of race, caste, religion, place of birth, sex, gender identity, sexual orientation, disability or any other category.
- Hindu Succession Act, 1956 - Abolished the "limited owner" status of women who owned property, amended in 2004 to give daughters equal inheritance rights with sons.
- Scheduled Caste and Scheduled Tribe (Prevention of Atrocities) Act, 1989 - Specifically deals with all kinds of discrimination and hate crimes on the basis of caste.
- Transgender Persons (Protection of Rights) Act, 2019 - Specifically deals with all kinds of discrimination and hate crimes faced by people on the basis of their gender identity and gender expression.
- Rights of Persons with Disabilities Act, 2016 - Specifically prohibits discrimination and violence against people with physical and/or mental disabilities.
- Human Immunodeficiency Virus and Acquired Immune Deficiency Syndrome (Prevention and Control) Act, 2017 - Prohibits discrimination and propagation of hate against people with HIV.

== International ==
- Equality of Treatment (Accident Compensation) Convention, 1925
- Convention against Discrimination in Education, 1960
- Equality of Treatment (Social Security) Convention, 1962
- Convention concerning Migrations in Abusive Conditions and the Promotion of Equality of Opportunity and Treatment of Migrant Workers, 1975
- Convention on the Elimination of All Forms of Discrimination against Women, 1979
- Convention on the Elimination of All Forms of Racial Discrimination, 1965
- Convention on the Rights of Persons with Disabilities, 2006
- Discrimination (Employment and Occupation) Convention, 1958
- Equal Remuneration Convention, 1951
- Protocol 12 to the European Convention on Human Rights, 2000
- Directive 76/207/EEC on the implementation of the principle of equal treatment for men and women as regards access to employment, vocational training and promotion, and working conditions
- Directive 2000/43/EC on Anti-discrimination
- Directive 2004/113/EC implementing the principle of equal treatment between men and women in the access to and supply of goods and services
- Directive 2006/54/EC on the implementation of the principle of equal opportunities and equal treatment of men and women in matters of employment and occupation
- Charter of Fundamental Rights of the European Union whose Article 21 prohibits all discrimination including on basis of disability, age and sexual orientation
- Inter-American Convention against Racism, Racial Discrimination and Related Forms of Intolerance, 2013
- Inter-American Convention against All Forms of Discrimination and Intolerance, 2013

== Israel ==
- Employment (Equal Opportunities) Law, 1988
- Prohibition of Discrimination in Products, Services and Entry into Places of Entertainment and Public Places Law, 2000

== Netherlands ==
- Anti-discrimination is enforced by Wetboek van Strafrecht, articles 137c-h, and by the Dutch Constitution Law, article 1

== New Zealand ==
- New Zealand Bill of Rights Act 1990, section 19
- Human Rights Act 1993

== Nigeria ==
HIV/AIDS Anti-Discrimination Act 2014. This bill makes it illegal to discriminate against people based on their HIV status.

== Poland ==
- Statute of Kalisz 1264
- Warsaw Confederation Act 1573

== Russia ==
- Declaration of the Rights of the Peoples of Russia, 1917

== Serbia ==
- Law on the Prohibition of Discrimination, 2009
- Constitution of the Republic Serbia, 2006

== South Africa ==
- Section Nine of the Constitution of South Africa
- Employment Equity Act, 1998
- Promotion of Equality and Prevention of Unfair Discrimination Act, 2000

== United Kingdom ==
- Disability Discrimination Act 1995
- Disability Discrimination Act 2005
- Equal Pay Act 1970
- Equality Act 2006
- Equality Act 2010
- Race Relations Act 1965
- Race Relations Act 1968 and Race Relations Act 1976 amended by the Race Relations Amendment Act 2000
- Representation of the People Act 1918
- Representation of the People (Equal Franchise) Act 1928
- Sex Discrimination Act 1975, amended by the Sex Discrimination (Election Candidates) Act 2002
- See also the Employment Equality Regulations covering sexual orientation, religion or belief and age.

Northern Ireland has a similar pattern of 'separate' equality legislation.

== See also ==
- Hate crime
- Bill of rights
  - Bill of Rights 1689
  - Canadian Charter of Rights and Freedoms
  - United States Bill of Rights
- Civil rights
- Disability discrimination act
- Discrimination
- Equal Rights Amendment
