= Freedom of religion in Australia =

Freedom of religion in Australia is allowed in practice and protected to varying degrees through the constitution and legislation at the Federal, state and territory level. Australia is a pluralist country with legislated principle of state neutrality and with no state religion. The nation has over 13.6 million people who identify as religious and over 9.8 million who identify with no religion.

Relevant legislation protecting religious freedoms include sections of the Constitution of Australia, Federal anti-discrimination laws and State/Territory-based human rights Acts and anti-discrimination laws. As these freedoms are not protected in a single piece of legislation, but rather appear as sections, clauses and exemptions in other Acts or laws, legal religious freedom protections are often a source of great debate and difficult to discern in Australia.

== Religious freedom laws ==
=== Federal level ===
The Constitution of Australia prohibits the Commonwealth from establishing laws which create, force or prohibit any religion. It also restricts the Commonwealth from using religion as a qualifier or test in order to hold public office. Section 116 of Chapter V. The States in the Australian Constitution reads:

The Commonwealth shall not make any law for establishing any religion, or for imposing any religious observance, or for prohibiting the free exercise of any religion, and no religious test shall be required as a qualification for any office or public trust under the Commonwealth.

The section is based on the First Amendment to the United States Constitution. The article does not prohibit the states of Australia from implementing such laws, meaning legislation at the state level could provide for restriction or enforcement of religion.

=== State and territory level ===
Two referendums were held on whether to restrict the ability of states to legislate laws that may impede religious freedoms: the 1944 Australian Post-War Reconstruction and Democratic Rights referendum and 1988 Australian referendum. Both failed to achieve a majority of support amongst the states and therefore did not pass into law. In theory, Australian State and Territory Governments can therefore pass laws impeding religious freedoms.

Some states and territories have implemented a bill or charter of rights which include freedom and protection for religion, such as Section 14: Freedom of thought, conscience, religion and belief in:

- Human Rights Act 2004 (Australian Capital Territory)
- Charter of Human Rights & Responsibilities Act 2006 (Victoria)

These legislated Acts are based on the International Covenant on Civil and Political Rights, to which Australia was a signatory in 1966 despite no direct legislation to permit these freedoms. These Acts do not prevent the passing of laws that impede any rights mentioned (including religious freedoms), but they do create a process by which all legislation must be scrutinised for human rights implications, and must be accompanied by a statement of compatibility with human rights before they can be passed by the relevant Parliament. In cases where the legislation is not compatible, it may still be passed despite contradicting these human rights acts.

== Anti-discrimination laws ==
Anti-discrimination laws addressing unfair treatment on the basis of a range of attributes, including religion, also apply at the state and federal level. These laws contribute to religious freedoms by allowing Australians to practice religion without fear of consequence from the executive, organisations or individuals. This is achieved by prohibiting detrimental treatment as a result of an individual's religious appearance, beliefs or observances. Some argue these laws are inconsistent at the state level and may be limited at the federal level.

=== Federal level ===
The Australian Human Rights Commission Act 1986 defines discrimination as:

(a) any distinction, exclusion or preference made on the basis of race, colour, sex, religion, political opinion, national extraction or social origin that has the effect of nullifying or impairing equality of opportunity or treatment in employment or occupation;

In November 2021, the Morrison government introduced the Religious Discrimination Bill 2021, ostensibly to better protect the rights of religious Australians. The bill sparked a lot of controversy, especially over the so-called "Folau Clause", named after footballer Israel Folau. The clause would have provided legal protection for persons against their employers when making statements of religious belief. Although this clause was removed in the latest iteration of the bill, the bill as a whole created concern that it would allow employers and schools to discriminate against LGBTQI+ employees and students. Key members of the moderate faction within the Liberal party pushed for - and won - the repeal of Section 38.2 of the separate Sex Discrimination Act 1984, which allows religious schools to discriminate on the basis of sexual orientation and gender identity. This change resulted in the Australian Christian Lobby and Christian Schools Australia, along with multiple conservatives within the party, pulling support for the bill, leading to it being shelved on 2 December.

=== State and Territory level ===
State and Territory legislation prohibits unfavourable treatment on the basis of an individual's personal characteristics, but to varying degrees and with varying detail.

Personal characteristics includes religious beliefs or activities in anti-discrimination legislation for the majority of states, and as such these laws may be seen to support religious freedom by prohibiting unfair treatment using religion as a basis. Further, religious beliefs and activities are protected through anti-discrimination Acts in some states including:

- Equal Opportunity Act 1984 (Western Australia)
- Discrimination Act 1991 (Australian Capital Territory)
- Anti-Discrimination Act 1991 (Queensland)
- Anti-Discrimination Act 1996 (Northern Territory)
- Anti-Discrimination Act 1998 (Tasmania)
- Equal Opportunity Act 2010 (Victoria)

Two other state Acts apply narrower protection to 'religious appearance or dress' (Equal Opportunity Act 1984, South Australia) and 'Ethno-religious or national origin' (Anti-Discrimination Act 1977, New South Wales). It has been suggested that both states update their laws in order to align to the rest of the States and Territories.

=== Religious exemptions ===
General religious exception or exemption clauses exist within the various federal and state human rights Acts with the aim to ensuring religious activities or observances are not impacted or inhibited by the protections provided by each Act. These exemptions therefore protect freedom of religion by permitting what would otherwise be considered discrimination if it is in the context of "an act or practice of a body established for religious purposes that conforms to the doctrines, tenets or beliefs of that religion or is necessary to avoid injury to the religious sensitivities of adherents of that religion."

In the case of the Australian Human Rights Commission Act 1986, for example, an exemption is provided:

Discrimination ... does not include any distinction, exclusion or preference:

(d) in connection with employment as a member of the staff of an institution that is conducted in accordance with the doctrines, tenets, beliefs or teachings of a particular religion or creed, being a distinction, exclusion or preference made in good faith in order to avoid injury to the religious susceptibilities of adherents of that religion or that creed.

Varying groups have argued that existing religious exceptions and exemptions go too far and impede the rights of individuals, whilst others argue the correct balance has been struck, and yet others petition for wider-reaching religious exemption clauses.

== Judgements and interpretations ==
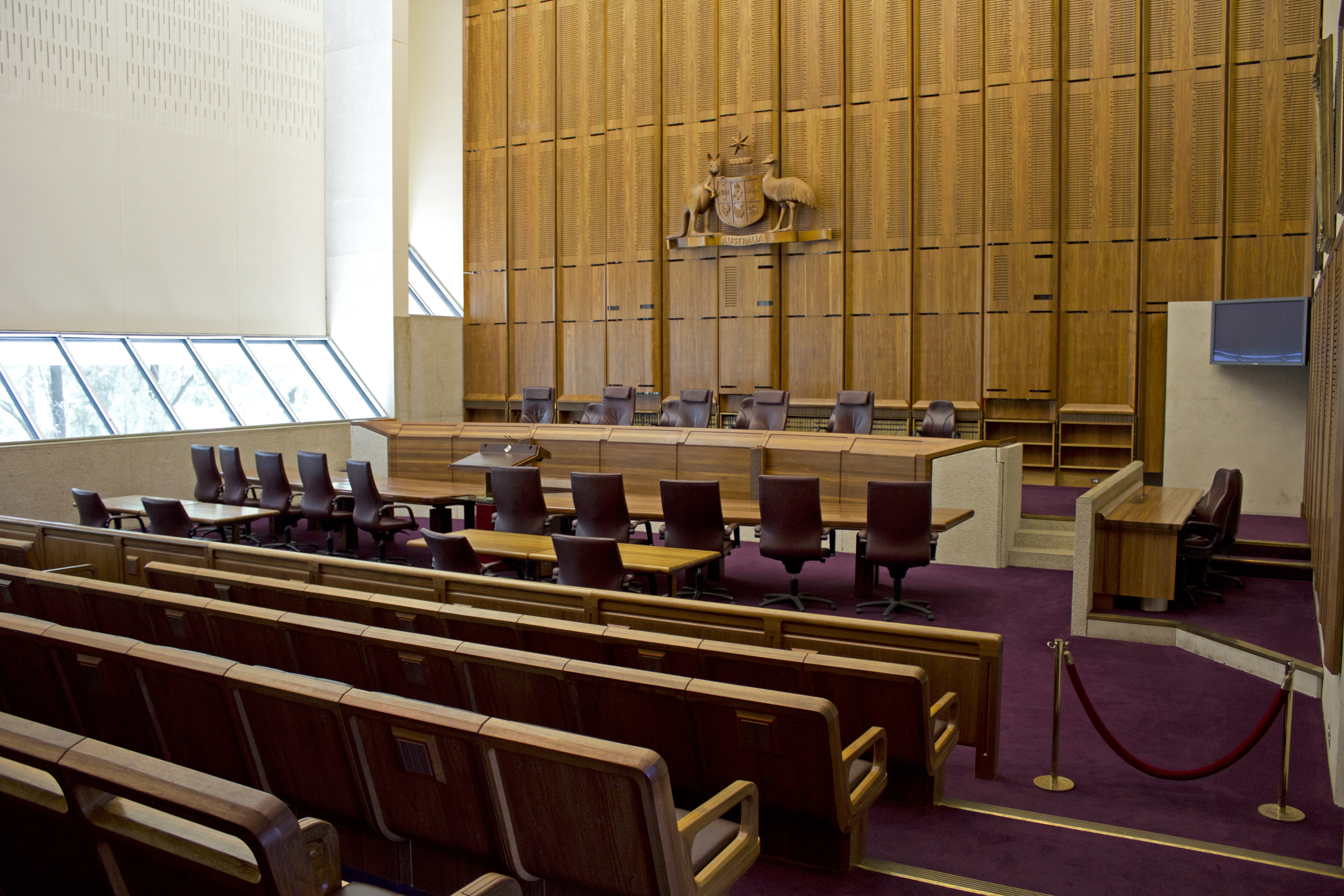
Court 2 of the High Court of Australia, Canberra. The High Court has issued few judgements in direct relation to freedom of religion.

There have been few tests involving religious freedom put before the High Court of Australia. Judgements from the Court are generally considered to interpret the primary piece of legislation relating to religious freedom, Section 116, narrowly.

=== Church of the New Faith v Commissioner for Pay-Roll Tax (Vic) ===
In the 1983 judgment of the High Court in Church of the New Faith v Commissioner for Pay-Roll Tax (Vic), the court was primarily concerned with whether Scientology was a religion (and therefore entitled to tax exempt status). In judgement, the Court found that Scientology was a religion and argued that the definition of religion must be flexible, but also remain sceptical of false claims. Justices Ronald Wilson and William Deane set out five "indicia" of a religion:

(i) That the collection of ideas and practices involved a belief in the supernatural (being something that could not be perceived by the senses); (ii) That 'the ideas relate to man's nature and place in the universe and his relation to things supernatural'; (iii) That the adherents accept certain ideas as requiring them or encouraging them to observe particular codes of conduct or specific practices having some supernatural significance; (iv) The adherents themselves form an identifiable group or groups; (v) The adherents themselves see the collection of ideas, beliefs and practices as constituting a religion.

In this judgement Section 116 was interpreted more broadly than in previous cases. The justices held that Section 116 provides fundamental guarantees to freedom of religion:

The development of the law towards complete religious liberty and religious equality... would be subverted and the guarantees in s. 116 of the Constitution would lose their character as a bastion of freedom if religion were so defined as to exclude from its ambit minority religions out of the main streams of religious thought.

=== Adelaide Co of Jehovah's Witnesses Inc v Commonwealth ===
In the 1941 the Commonwealth Government declared Jehovah's Witnesses to be a risk to national security, indicating they were believed to be "prejudicial to the defence of the Commonwealth" and the "efficient prosecution of the war" due to their following ideals of another Kingdom. Police occupied premises of the religious group, prompting a lawsuit heard by the High Court in which Jehovah's Witnesses argued their rights granted under Section 116 of the Constitution were infringed.

The court held that the National Security (Subversive Organisations) Regulations 1940, under which the Government had taken action, did not infringe against Section 116, but that the government had exceeded their "defence power" in section 51(vi) of the Constitution. Jehovah's Witnesses have since continued to practice in Australia unhindered.

== Criticism and status quo ==
The absence of a Federal Bill of Rights (or Human Rights Act) which provide a guarantee of religious and other freedoms in almost all other western democracies, has been noted as a primary failure to solidify the current de facto and de jure rights to freedom of religion in Australia. The Australian Human Rights Commission has criticised the lack of protections for religious freedom alongside other de facto freedoms and has recommended the introduction of a Bill of Rights to formally protect the rights of people.

Others have highlighted that religion and religious freedoms are already well-protected, including with exemptions to anti-discrimination legislation. Frequently highlighted examples include religious schools having rights not extended to other institutions, including the ability to fire teachers who do not align with the institution's religious beliefs for any reason. This occurred in the case of the Perth South Coast Baptist College and teacher Craig Campbell who was sacked for coming out as homosexual in 2017.

== Ruddock Review ==
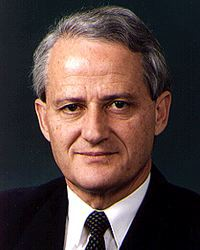
Philip Ruddock, chair of the Religious Freedom Review

=== Report commission ===
Following the passage of same-sex marriage legislation in Australia in 2017, a federal review was commissioned by the Turnbull government to examine the suitability of current religious freedom protections, specifically within the context of the new Marriage Amendment (Definition and Religious Freedoms) Act 2017. The Religious Freedom Review was chaired by Philip Ruddock, the former Attorney-General for Australia at the time same-sex marriage was banned by the Howard government in 2004, and had no associated terms of reference.

The review panel was composed of Ruddock alongside Jesuit priest Frank Brennan, former judge Annabelle Bennett, Human Rights Commission president Ros Croucher and constitutional lawyer Nicholas Aroney. The expert review panel first met on 10 January 2018, and on 18 May the final review was handed to the Turnbull government. The Government has declined to release the review in full pending cabinet discussion on its recommendations.

The Ruddock review has been interpreted as a way to allow the speedy passage of Dean Smith's marriage bill and to postpone discussions of religious freedom. Proponents of the Ruddock Review argue it is necessary to ensure that religious freedoms are upheld in the wake of religious objection to same-sex marriage, whilst opponents highlight that further protections for religion are not necessary and will occur at the expense of an individual's right to be free from discrimination (particularly in the case of same-sex marriages). Groups such as the Victorian Aids Council and Australian Human Rights Commission have argued that a comprehensive Bill of Rights -rather than an exclusive religious freedoms law- should be implemented as this would also give full effect to Australia's obligations and commitments under the International Covenant on Civil and Political Rights by enshrining all fundamental rights.

=== Government response ===
Turnbull's government indicated it would not release the report received in May 2018 until it had been considered in full by the government. Following the deposition of Malcolm Turnbull as Prime Minister, his replacement Scott Morrison indicated his government would not release the report or form a full response to it before the end of 2018. This drew criticism from Michael Kirby and Kerryn Phelps given the timing of the Wentworth by-election, as voters would not have an understanding of any changes to religious law potentially instituted by Australia's first Pentecostal Prime Minister.

Despite a Senate motion ordering its release ahead of the by-election, the government refused to comply, claiming that a release would "harm the public interest" and interfere in cabinet consideration. Prime Minister Scott Morrison suggested in an ABC Radio National interview that the Ruddock review had recommended that people of different religions have the same protections as other attributes such as gender and race.

=== Leaks and media coverage ===
On 9 October 2018, extracts of the review were leaked to Fairfax Media, which reported that schools affiliated with a religion "would be guaranteed the right to turn away gay students and teachers under changes to federal anti-discrimination laws" recommended by the review. The Prime Minister initially defended this, but stated that the media coverage of the leaked report was "confused". Religious schools have held the right to discriminate against teachers and students on the basis of their gender or sexual orientation since 2013, however the Ruddock report recommended that schools additionally be required to hold a publicly available policy and put the best interests of the child first.

Following further media coverage and public pressure, the Labor opposition announced their support would be lent to the government should it seek to repeal the discrimination law exemptions already in existence which allow religious schools to ban students based on their sexuality. The Morrison government subsequently agreed to introduce a bill to parliament with that aim. The Australian Greens and Labor opposition have further committed to revoking discrimination exemptions that also allow discrimination against teachers based on their sexual orientation, however the government has so far not indicated its position.

The full recommendations of the review were subsequently leaked to Fairfax and reported on 12 October 2018.

=== Attempts to legislate ===
The Morrison government ultimately drafted the Religious Discrimination Bill in response to the Ruddock Review. The bill was introduced to the lower house, where amendments to protect transgender students were passed when government back-benchers crossed the floor to vote with the opposition. The Morrison government ultimately shelved the bill in the final session of parliament, instead making it a 2022 Australian federal election promise to pass it. Following an election loss for Morrison, the bill's future is uncertain under the new Labor Albanese government. Albanese made news for mentioning the religious discrimination bill again in March 2024 saying that there must be bipartisanship and that "now is not the time to have a divisive debate".

== See also ==
- Section 116 of the Constitution of Australia
- Religion in Australia
- Separation of church and state in Australia
- Australian Bill of Rights Group
- Broken Rites – Non-profit Australian support group
- Catholic Church sexual abuse cases in Australia
