= Omega Spielhallen und Automatenaufstellungs-GmbH v Oberbürgermeisterin der Bundesstadt Bonn =

Omega GmbH v Bonn
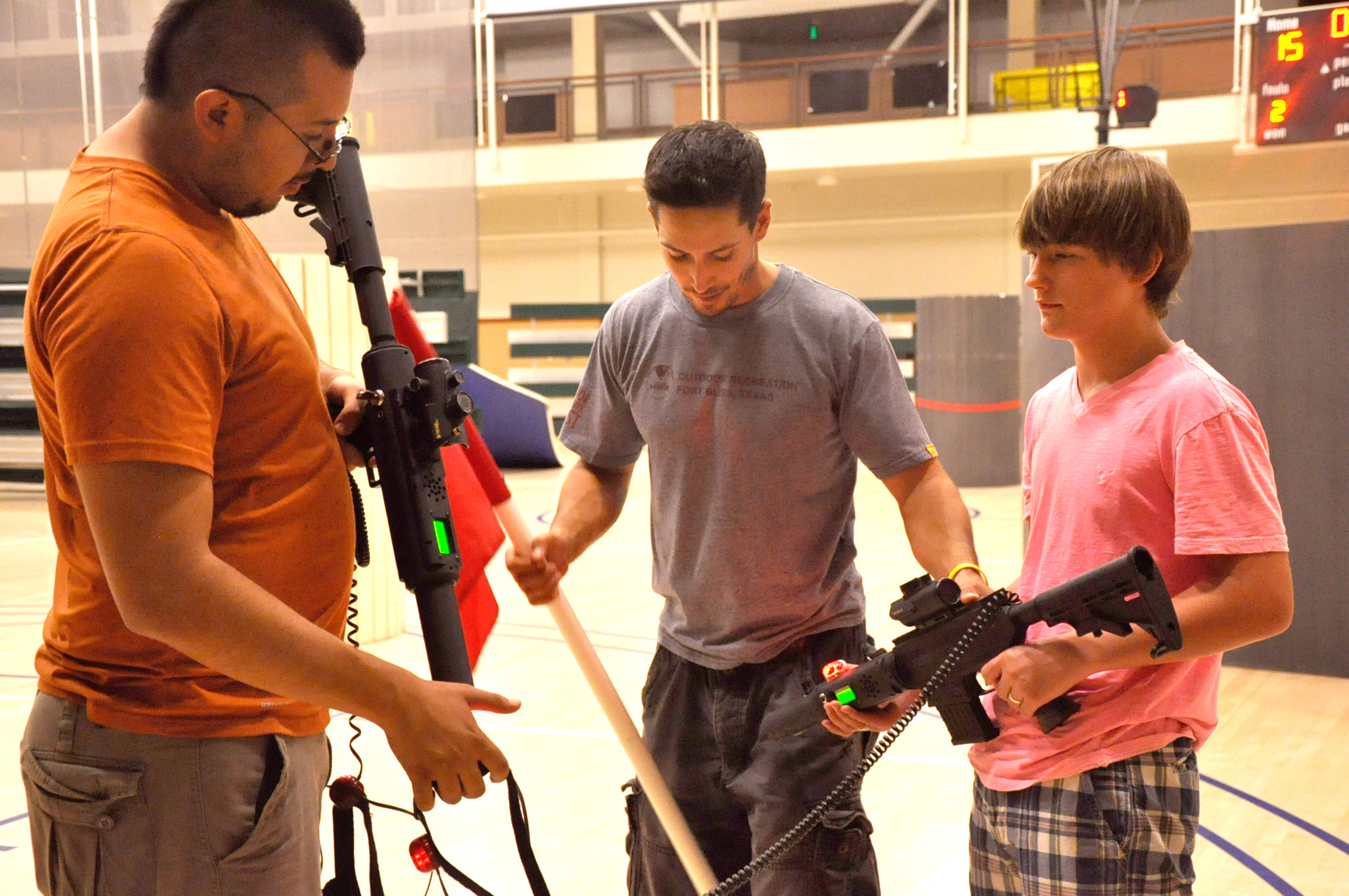
- Court: European Court of Justice
- Citations: (2004) C-36/02, [2004] ECR I-9609

Keywords
- Free movement of goods Free movement of services

Omega Spielhallen und Automatenaufstellungs-GmbH v Oberbürgermeisterin der Bundesstadt Bonn (2004) C-36/02 is an EU law case, concerning the freedom to provide services and the free movement of goods in the European Union.

== Facts ==
Omega GmbH claimed that a prohibition on it setting up a ‘laserdrome’, where people shot each other with fake laser guns, was an unlawful restriction on free movement of services. The Bonn government, under the Ordnungsbehördengesetz Nordrhein-Westfalen, applied a law saying ‘The police authorities may take measures necessary to avert a risk to public order or safety in an individual case’. This followed protests against the laserdrome because it was ‘playing at killing’ people. The guns came from a UK company Pulsar Advanced Games Systems Ltd.

The German Federal Administrative Court (Bundesverwaltungsgericht) held that banning the game was compatible with the Basic Law (Grundgesetz) article 1(1) on human dignity, ‘by the awakening or strengthening in the player of an attitude denying the fundamental right of each person to be acknowledged and respected’.

== Judgment ==
The Court of Justice, First Chamber, held that the restriction on the service was justified, as it was done on the grounds of pursuit of human dignity.

15 The national court queries, however, whether, in the light of the judgment in Case C-275/92 Schindler [1994] ECR I-1039, a common legal conception in all Member States is a precondition for one of those States being enabled to restrict at its discretion a certain category of provisions of goods or services protected by the EC Treaty. Should Schindler have to be interpreted in that way, it could be difficult to confirm the contested order if it were not possible to deduce a common legal conception as regards the assessment in Member States of games for entertainment with simulated killing actions.

[...]

25 In that respect, this Court finds that the contested order, by prohibiting Omega from operating its ‘laserdrome’ in accordance with the form of the game developed by Pulsar and lawfully marketed by it in the United Kingdom, particularly under the franchising system, affects the freedom to provide services which Article 49 EC guarantees both to providers and to the persons receiving those services established in another Member State. Moreover, in so far as use of the form of the game developed by Pulsar involves the use of specific equipment, which is also lawfully marketed in the United Kingdom, the prohibition imposed on Omega is likely to deter it from acquiring the equipment in question, thereby infringing the free movement of goods ensured by Article 28 EC.

26 However, where a national measure affects both the freedom to provide services and the free movement of goods, the Court will, in principle, examine it in relation to just one of those two fundamental freedoms if it is clear that, in the circumstances of the case, one of those freedoms is entirely secondary in relation to the other and may be attached to it (see, to that effect, Schindler, paragraph 22; Canal Satélite Digital, paragraph 31; Case C-71/02 Karner [2004] ECR I-0000, paragraph 46).

27 In the circumstances of this case, the aspect of the freedom to provide services prevails over that of the free movement of goods. The Bonn police authority and the Commission of the European Communities have rightly pointed out that the contested order restricts the importation of goods only as regards equipment specifically designed for the prohibited variant of the laser game and that that is an unavoidable consequence of the restriction imposed with regard to supplies of services by Pulsar. Therefore, as the Advocate General has concluded in paragraph 32 of her Opinion, there is no need to make an independent examination of the compatibility of that order with the Treaty provisions governing the free movement of goods.

[...]

29 In these proceedings, it is undisputed that the contested order was adopted independently of any consideration linked to the nationality of the providers or recipients of the services placed under a restriction. In any event, since measures for safeguarding public policy fall within a derogation from the freedom to provide services set out in Article 46 EC, it is not necessary to verify whether those measures are applied without distinction both to national providers of services and those established in other Member States.

30 However, the possibility of a Member State relying on a derogation laid down by the Treaty does not prevent judicial review of measures applying that derogation (Case 41/74 Van Duyn [1974] ECR 1337, paragraph 7). In addition, the concept of ‘public policy’ in the Community context, particularly as justification for a derogation from the fundamental principle of the freedom to provide services, must be interpreted strictly, so that its scope cannot be determined unilaterally by each Member State without any control by the Community institutions (see, by analogy with the free movement of workers, Van Duyn, paragraph 18; Case 30/77 Bouchereau [1977] ECR 1999, paragraph 33). Thus, public policy may be relied on only if there is a genuine and sufficiently serious threat to a fundamental interest of society (Case C-54/99 Église de Scientologie [2000] ECR I-1335, paragraph 17).

31 The fact remains, however, that the specific circumstances which may justify recourse to the concept of public policy may vary from one country to another and from one era to another. The competent national authorities must therefore be allowed a margin of discretion within the limits imposed by the Treaty (Van Duyn, paragraph 18, and Bouchereau, paragraph 34).

[...]

33 It should be recalled in that context that, according to settled case-law, fundamental rights form an integral part of the general principles of law the observance of which the Court ensures, and that, for that purpose, the Court draws inspiration from the constitutional traditions common to the Member States and from the guidelines supplied by international treaties for the protection of human rights on which the Member States have collaborated or to which they are signatories. The European Convention on Human Rights and Fundamental Freedoms has special significance in that respect (see, inter alia, Case C-260/89 ERT [1991] ECR I-2925, paragraph 41; Case C-274/99 P Connolly v Commission [2001] ECR I-1611, paragraph 37; Case C-94/00 Roquette Frères [2002] ECR I-9011, paragraph 25; Case C-112/00 Schmidberger [2003] ECR I-5659, paragraph 71).

34 As the Advocate General argues in paragraphs 82 to 91 of her Opinion, the Community legal order undeniably strives to ensure respect for human dignity as a general principle of law. There can therefore be no doubt that the objective of protecting human dignity is compatible with Community law, it being immaterial in that respect that, in Germany, the principle of respect for human dignity has a particular status as an independent fundamental right.

35 Since both the Community and its Member States are required to respect fundamental rights, the protection of those rights is a legitimate interest which, in principle, justifies a restriction of the obligations imposed by Community law, even under a fundamental freedom guaranteed by the Treaty such as the freedom to provide services (see, in relation to the free movement of goods, Schmidberger, paragraph 74).

36 However, measures which restrict the freedom to provide services may be justified on public policy grounds only if they are necessary for the protection of the interests which they are intended to guarantee and only in so far as those objectives cannot be attained by less restrictive measures (see, in relation to the free movement of capital, Église de Scientologie, paragraph 18).

37 It is not indispensable in that respect for the restrictive measure issued by the authorities of a Member State to correspond to a conception shared by all Member States as regards the precise way in which the fundamental right or legitimate interest in question is to be protected. Although, in paragraph 60 of Schindler, the Court referred to moral, religious or cultural considerations which lead all Member States to make the organisation of lotteries and other games with money subject to restrictions, it was not its intention, by mentioning that common conception, to formulate a general criterion for assessing the proportionality of any national measure which restricts the exercise of an economic activity.

38 On the contrary, as is apparent from well-established case-law subsequent to Schindler, the need for, and proportionality of, the provisions adopted are not excluded merely because one Member State has chosen a system of protection different from that adopted by another State (see, to that effect, Läärä, paragraph 36; Zenatti, paragraph 34; Case C-6/01 Anomar and Others [2003] ECR I-0000, paragraph 80).

39 In this case, it should be noted, first, that, according to the referring court, the prohibition on the commercial exploitation of games involving the simulation of acts of violence against persons, in particular the representation of acts of homicide, corresponds to the level of protection of human dignity which the national constitution seeks to guarantee in the territory of the Federal Republic of Germany. It should also be noted that, by prohibiting only the variant of the laser game the object of which is to fire on human targets and thus ‘play at killing’ people, the contested order did not go beyond what is necessary in order to attain the objective pursued by the competent national authorities.

40 In those circumstances, the order of 14 September 1994 cannot be regarded as a measure unjustifiably undermining the freedom to provide services.

== See also ==
- European Union law
