= Marshall v Southampton Health Authority =

1986 European Union law case

Marshall v Southampton and SW Hampshire AHA
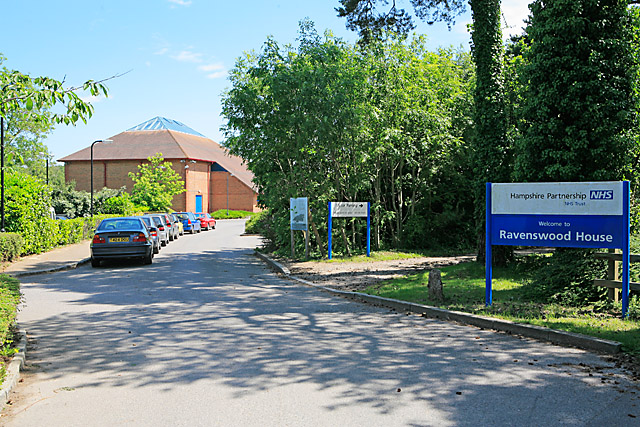
- Court: European Court of Justice
- Citations: (1986) Case 152/84, [1986] ECR 723

Keywords
- Direct effect

Marshall v Southampton and South West Hampshire Area Health Authority (1986) Case 152/84 is an EU law case, concerning the conflict of law between a national legal system and European Union law.

== Facts ==
Helen Marshall, a senior dietitian, claimed that her dismissal on grounds of being old violated the Equal Treatment Directive 1976. She was an employee of an Area Health Authority (or "AHA"), a body established by the UK government under the National Health Service Act 1977, as amended by the Health Services Act 1980.

Marshall was dismissed after 14 years on 31 March 1980, approximately four weeks after attaining the age of 62, despite her expressing a willingness to continue in employment until the age of 65 (4 February 1983). The sole reason for her dismissal was that she had passed 'the retirement age'; the AHA's policy was to make women compulsorily retire at 60, but men at 65.

Section 27 (1) and 28 (1) of the Social Security Act 1975 provided state pensions were to be granted to men at 65 and woman at 60, though notably did not impose any obligation to retire at the age at which the state pension becomes payable.

The AHA were able to waive the term, which was deemed an implied term of Marshall's contract of employment and had done so for a further two years after she attained the age of 60.

Given Marshall suffered financial loss, namely the difference between her earnings as an employee and her pension, and since she lost the satisfaction gained from work she initiated proceedings before an industrial tribunal, contending her dismissal constituted discriminatory treatment on the ground of sex, contrary to the sexual discrimination act and community law. The tribunal dismissed the claim in so far as it was based on infringement of the sexual discrimination act, since s 6 (4) permits discrimination of the grounds of sex in regards to retirement. However the claim on the basis that the principle of equal treatment laid down by directive 76/207 was upheld.

The employment appeal tribunal affirmed the industrial tribunal on the first point, yet set aside the decision on the second point, on the basis that an individual had no locus standi and could not rely upon such a violation in proceedings before a United Kingdom court or tribunal.

The English Court of Appeal found the Area Health Authority an ‘emanation of the State’, observing that the AHA respondent was constituted under s.8(1) of the National Health Service Act 1977. The Court made reference of two questions for preliminary ruling to the European Court of Justice (ECJ):

- First, whether the respondent's dismissal on the grounds that she was a woman who had passed the normal retiring age was an act of discrimination prohibited by the Directive.
- Secondly, if the answer to the first is affirmative, whether or not the equal treatment directive can be relied upon by the appellant in the circumstances in national courts or tribunals, not withstanding the inconsistency, if any, between the Directive and the Sex Discrimination Act 1975.

== Judgment ==
=== Advocate General Opinion ===
Advocate General Slynn argued the ‘state’ should be construed broadly, to cover all organs, saying that insinuating ‘horizontal effect’ into directives would ‘totally blur the distinction between EU directives and regulations'.

=== Court of Justice ===
The ECJ, in a full court of 13 judges, answered to the first question that a general policy concerning dismissal if a woman solely because she has attained the qualifying age for a state pension, which age is different for men and for women, constitutes discrimination on grounds of sex and as such is in breach of the directive.

To the second question the Court held that the directive can be relied on by the individual against an actor of state, but not of private legal entities. The Court thus held there was no horizontal direct effect. According to the court, it does not matter what capacity a state is acting. Thus it fell to enquire whether the NHS should be deemed an "independent legal person" or an "arm of the state"; and that was a matter for the national court.

48. ... according to article 189 of the EEC Treaty the binding nature of a directive, which constitutes the basis for the possibility of relying on the directive before a national court, exists only in relation to 'each member state to which it is addressed'. It follows that a directive may not of itself impose obligations on an individual and that a provision of a directive may not be relied on as such against such a person. 49. ... In either case it is necessary to prevent the State from taking advantage of its own failure to comply with Union law.

=== English Court of Appeal ===
This case involved an application for a preliminary ruling. Once the ECJ had answered the question, their decision was remitted to the reconvened Court of Appeal (which in the interim had adjourned this case). The Court of Appeal was then obliged to reach a decision in the light of the ECJ ruling.

== Significance ==
This decision confirmed directives cannot create obligations for private parties nor can they be invoked against one. However, even though the case affirmed that there would be no horizontal effect, it still found the AHA possibly in breach of the directive if it would be deemed a state actor. As it should be clear that AHA is in no position to implement the directive itself, some commentators have regarded this decision as a start of slippery slope to introduce horizontal effect, even though in letter the decision says otherwise.

== See also ==
- European Union law
- Direct effect
- Foster v British Gas plc
