= P v S and Cornwall County Council =

European Court of Justice case regarding discrimination against transsexuals

P v S
- European Court of Justice

Submitted 13 January 1994 Decided 30 April 1996
- Full case name: P v S and Cornwall County Council
- Case: C-13/94 ECR I-2143
- CelexID: 61994CJ0013
- Chamber: Full Court

Court composition
- Judge-Rapporteur; Paul Joan George Kapteyn
- President; Gil Carlos Rodríguez Iglesias
- Advocate General; Giuseppe Tesauro

Instruments cited
- Directive 76/207/EEC (Equal Treatment Directive)

P v S and Cornwall County Council was a landmark case of the European Court of Justice (ECJ) which extended the scope of sex equality to discrimination against transsexuals.

The case concerned a United Kingdom (UK) trans woman, referred to as P in court proceedings, who was dismissed from her post after informing her employers that she was undergoing gender reassignment. She took her employers to an Employment Tribunal. The Tribunal agreed that she had been dismissed because of her gender reassignment, but was unable to rule that she had been discriminated against because at that time the Sex Discrimination Act (SDA) offered little protection to transsexual people. If P had been a trans man, he would have been treated in the same way and so there were no grounds in the SDA to rule that P had been discriminated against. However, the UK was part of the European Community and thus obliged to implement the Equal Treatment Directive. The Tribunal felt the scope of the Directive was wider than that of the SDA and accordingly asked the ECJ for a preliminary ruling. Effectively, the Tribunal asked the Court to rule whether the Directive precluded dismissal of a transsexual for a reason related to his or her gender reassignment.

The Court, assisted by an influential opinion from Advocate General Tesauro, ruled that the Directive was an expression of a fundamental principle of equality and thus that the Directive did indeed preclude dismissal for a reason related to gender reassignment. The Tribunal was able to rule in P's favour and P received compensation from her employers.

It was the first piece of case law, anywhere in the world, which prevents discrimination in employment or vocational education because someone is transsexual. The scope of the ruling is considered as applying to transsexuals "intending to undergo, undergoing or [who] have undergone gender reassignment". However, the Court left open the question of employment where the natal sex or its continuity was a constitutive element in the employee's job. In UK law this is reflected in the Equality Act 2010 where transsexuals can be barred from gender-specific services if that is "a proportionate means of achieving a legitimate aim".

== Facts and Procedure ==
P was a male to female transgender woman who worked as a senior manager in an educational establishment maintained by Cornwall County Council. She started her employment as a man on 1 April 1991. In April 1992, she informed S, Chief Executive of the establishment, that she intended to undergo gender reassignment. She explained to S that she was to undertake a "life test", an initial period of a year living as a woman. That summer P took sick leave for initial surgery. At the beginning of September 1992, she was given three months notice of dismissal. She was not allowed to return to work as a woman. Final surgery took place before the notice of dismissal had expired. On 3 March 1993, P brought an action before Truro Employment Tribunal, complaining that she had been discriminated against on the grounds of sex. Both S and Cornwall County Council maintained the termination was due to redundancy.

The Tribunal determined that although there was redundancy within P's establishment, the sole and exclusive reason for her dismissal was her gender reassignment. The Tribunal found this situation was not covered by the Sex Discrimination Act. However, article 1(1) of the Equal Treatment Directive states that the purpose of the Directive is to put into effect the principle of equal treatment for men and women, while article 2(1) of the Directive provides that the principle of equal treatment means that there is to be "no discrimination whatsoever on grounds of sex, either directly or indirectly". Moreover, recital 3 in the preamble to the Directive asserts that equal treatment for men and women constitutes one of the objectives of the European Community. The Tribunal considered the scope of the Directive could thus possibly extend to the protection of transsexuals and decided to stay proceedings and refer that interpretation of the Directive to the European Court of Justice. The Court responded in its judgment of 30 April 1996.

== Advocate General's opinion ==
The opinion of the Advocate General is distinct from the judgment of the Court and has an advisory character. In an influential opinion, Advocate General Tesauro stressed the need for the law to keep pace with the times.

24 ... I am well aware that I am asking the Court to make a `courageous' decision. I am asking it to do so, however, in the profound conviction that what is at stake is a universal fundamental value, indelibly etched in modern legal traditions and in the constitutions of the more advanced countries: the irrelevance of a person's sex with regard to the rules regulating relations in society. Whosoever believes in that value cannot accept the idea that a law should permit a person to be dismissed because she is a woman, or because he is a man, or because he or she changes from one of the two sexes (whichever it may be) to the other by means of an operation which - according to current medical knowledge - is the only remedy capable of bringing body and mind into harmony. Any other solution would sound like a moral condemnation - a condemnation, moreover, out of step with the times - of transsexuality, precisely when scientific advances and social change in this area are opening a perspective on the problem which certainly transcends the moral one ...

— Opinion of Mr Advocate General Tesauro delivered on 14 December 1995. - P v S and Cornwall County Council

== Judgment ==
The Court ruled that the Equal Treatment Directive was an expression of a fundamental principle of equality and that the Directive precluded dismissal for a reason related to gender reassignment.

17. The principle of equal treatment "for men and women" to which the directive refers in its title, preamble and provisions means, as Articles 2(1) and 3(1) in particular indicate, that there should be "no discrimination whatsoever on grounds of sex".

18. Thus, the directive is simply the expression, in the relevant field, of the principle of equality, which is one of the fundamental principles of Community law.

19. Moreover, as the Court has repeatedly held, the right not to be discriminated against on grounds of sex is one of the fundamental human rights whose observance the Court has a duty to ensure ...

20. Accordingly, the scope of the directive cannot be confined simply to discrimination based on the fact that a person is of one or other sex. In view of its purpose and the nature of the rights which it seeks to safeguard, the scope of the directive is also such as to apply to discrimination arising, as in this case, from the gender reassignment of the person concerned.

21. Such discrimination is based, essentially if not exclusively, on the sex of the person concerned. Where a person is dismissed on the ground that he or she intends to undergo, or has undergone, gender reassignment, he or she is treated unfavourably by comparison with persons of the sex to which he or she was deemed to belong before undergoing gender reassignment.

22. To tolerate such discrimination would be tantamount, as regards such a person, to a failure to respect the dignity and freedom to which he or she is entitled, and which the Court has a duty to safeguard.

— Case C-13/94 P v S and Cornwall County Council [1996] ECR I-2143

The Court noted that Article 2(2) of the Directive, relating to occupations where the sex of the worker was a determining factor, could be used to justify such a dismissal, but that there was no evidence this was so in P's case. (Note: Article 2(2) of the Directive provides " [The] Directive shall be without prejudice to the right of Member States to exclude from its field of application those occupational activities and, where appropriate, the training leading thereto, for which, by reason of their nature or the context in which they are carried out, the sex of the worker constitutes a determining factor.")

== Commentary ==
- Catherine Barnard considers the judgment important both for its broad approach to the principle of equality and for recognising both the moral and economic significance of the principle. She discusses the potential of the judgment as well as the barriers to implementing its potential.
- Eva Brems sets the judgment in the context of the national legislation of many European countries and the case law of the European Court of Human Rights of the time, which showed a moral consensus for maximum legal recognition of transsexuals, for example in the matter of marriage law and of privacy issues in relation to recording the natal sex on birth certificates.
- Chalmers et al. note that P v S, along with Defrenne v Sabena, were amongst the first ECJ cases to acknowledge that the principle of equal treatment set out in Article 157 of the Treaty on the Functioning of the European Union (TFEU) enshrines a fundamental right. They discuss KB v National Health Service Pensions Agency, where the Court left it the UK national courts to determine whether a transsexual could rely on his rights under Article 157 in a matter relating to assigning survivor's pension rights. They note that the Court's reluctance to fully engage with the complexities of gender identity is matched by the relatively timid revision at recital 3 of the Equal Treatment Directive (2006), which refers only to discrimination arising from gender reassignment. (Note: Recital 3 of the 2006 revised Equal Treatment Directive states "The Court of Justice has held that the scope of the principle of equal treatment for men and women cannot be confined to the prohibition of discrimination based on the fact that a person is of one or other sex. In view of its purpose and the nature of the rights which it seeks to safeguard, it also applies to discrimination arising from the gender reassignment of a person.")

== See also ==
- Press for Change
- List of LGBT-related cases before international courts and quasi-judicial bodies

== References and sources ==
Sources

- Chalmers, Damian; Davies, Gareth; Monti, Giorgio (2011). European Union Law (2nd ed.). UK: Cambridge University Press. p. 548. ISBN 978-0521121514.
- Barnard, Catherine (15 May 1997). "Chapter 4: P v S: Kite flying or a new constitutional approach?". In Dashwood, Alan; O'Leary, Siofra (eds.). The Principle of Equal Treatment in EC Law. Sweet & Maxwell. ISBN 978-0421590601. Archived (PDF) from the original on 4 November 2018.
- Brems, Eva (1996). "Case Law: P. v. S." Columbia Journal of European Law (2): 339–45. Archived from the original on 12 April 2014.
- "Council Directive 76/207/EEC of 9 February 1976 (Equal Treatment Directive)". EUR-Lex.
- "Directive 2006/54/EC of the European Parliament and of the Council of 5 July 2006 (Equal Treatment Directive)". EUR-Lex.
- "Equality and Human Rights Commission". equalityhumanrights.com. Equality and Human Rights Commission.
- "Opinion of Mr Advocate General Tesauro delivered on 14 December 1995. - P v S and Cornwall County Council". EUR-Lex.
- "P v S and Cornwall County Council [1996] ECR I-2143 (C-13/94)". EUR-Lex.
- "P vs S: full record of the ECJ proceedings" (PDF). Press for Change. 1996. Archived (PDF) from the original on 25 May 2015.
- Whittle, Stephen (2002). "Employment Discrimination and Transsexual People" (PDF). gires.org.uk. Gender Identity Research and Education Society. Archived from the original (PDF) on 15 August 2015.

Further reading
