= Rolls-Royce plc v Unite the Union =

- Court: Court of Appeal of England and Wales
- Citation: [2009] EWCA Civ 387

Keywords
- Redundancy

Rolls-Royce plc v Unite the Union [2009] EWCA Civ 387 is a UK labour law case, concerning redundancy.

== Facts ==
In the collective agreements between Rolls-Royce and Unite, each year of service gave employees an extra point against selection for redundancy. Rolls-Royce, challenging the collective agreement that it had itself agreed to, asked the court whether this was compatible with the Employment Equality (Age) Regulations 2006.

The High Court held that under EE(A)R 2006 r 3, the employer would have a defence to age discrimination because the collective agreement pursued a legitimate business aim, and in any case points for long service conferred a benefit on employees within regulation 32. Rolls-Royce argued that the judge had failed to consider whether the provision was proportionate, and there was no ‘benefit’ under regulation 32.

== Judgment ==
Arden LJ, Wall LJ and Aikens LJ dismissed the appeal in the Court of Appeal. Although the length of service criterion could be indirect discrimination, it pursued a legitimate aim, especially where part of a collective agreement. Although the judge did not explicitly deal with proportionality, objectively his decision was correct, and it was unnecessary to reach a view on regulation 32. But if pushed, they would have said he was right.
