= Age Discrimination Act =

Age Discrimination Act may refer to

- Age Discrimination Act 2004, Australia
- Age Discrimination in Employment Act of 1967, United States
