= Keech v Metropolitan Health Service =

2010 decision of the Federal Court of Australia

- Court: Federal Court of Australia
- Full case name: Keech v State of Western Australia Metropolitan Health Service t/as King Edward Memorial Hospital
- Decided: 2 December 2010
- Citations: [2010] FCA 1332, (2010) 215 FCR 393; 276 ALR 118; [2011] ALMD 3045; [2011] ALMD 3235

Court membership
- Judge sitting: Siopis J

Keech v Metropolitan Health Service was a court case decided in the Federal Court of Australia in which the exemption relating to acts of a State or Territory contained within the Age Discrimination Act 2004 was considered.

== The case ==
The applicant, Keech, was injured at work at the age of 66. RiskCover, the insurance company of the Metropolitan Health Service, accepted liability and paid compensation under the Workers’ Compensation and Injury Management Act 1981 (WA) (the WA Act). The WA Act provided different schemes of payment whereby workers injured before attaining the age of 64 would be entitled to compensation until they turned 65, and workers injured after attaining this age would be entitled to compensation for a year after the date of the injury.

Keech argued that by paying her compensation for the period prescribed by the WA Act, the Metropolitan Health Service had treated her less favourably than a younger employee who incurred a workplace injury at the same time as she did. She also argued that the conduct of the Metropolitan Health Service was not exempt from the Age Discrimination Act as it was not in direct compliance with the WA Act - that is, the WA Act prescribed a date at which entitlements to compensation could cease, but it did not oblige employers to stop paying at this time.

== The decision ==
Siopis J considered that the Metropolitan Health Service's conduct was unlikely to constitute age discrimination but found it unnecessary to finally determine this issue, because in any case they had directly complied with the WA Act. His Honour interpreted the WA Act as imposing an obligation on employers to pay compensation for a prescribed period and the respondent had directly complied with this requirement. As such, the employer's conduct was exempt from the Age Discrimination Act.

This article contains content derived from the October 2011 edition of "Federal Discrimination Law", produced by the Australian Human Rights Commission, which is licensed under the Creative Commons Attribution 3.0 Australia License.
