= Direct effect of European Union law =

Principle in European Union law

In the law of the European Union, direct effect is the principle that Union law may, if appropriately framed, confer rights on individuals which not only the courts but also the public administration (on national, regional or local level) of member states of the European Union are bound to recognise and enforce.

Direct effect is not explicitly stated in any of the EU Treaties. The principle of direct effect was first established by the Court of Justice of the European Union (CJEU) in Van Gend en Loos v. Nederlandse Administratie der Belastingen. Direct effect has subsequently been loosened in its application to treaty articles and the ECJ has expanded the principle, holding that it is capable of applying to virtually all of the possible forms of EU legislation, the most important of which are regulations, and in certain circumstances to directives.

The ECJ first articulated the doctrine of direct effect in the case of Van Gend en Loos, the European Court of Justice laid down the criteria (commonly referred to as the "Van Gend criteria") for establishing direct effect. The EU article provision had to be:

- clear,
- negative (a negative rather than a positive obligation)
- unconditional,
- containing no reservation on the part of the member state, and
- not dependent on any national implementing measure.

If these criteria were satisfied, then the right or rights in question could be enforced before national courts. Whether or not any particular measure satisfies the criteria is a matter of EU law to be determined by the EU Courts.

== Varieties of direct effect ==
In Van Gend en Loos it was decided that a citizen was able to enforce a right granted by European Community legislation against the state – the question of whether rights could be enforced against another citizen was not addressed. In Defrenne v. SABENA (No. 2), the European Court of Justice decided that there were two varieties of direct effect: vertical direct effect and horizontal direct effect, the distinction drawn being based on the person or entity against whom the right is to be enforced.

Vertical direct effect concerns the relationship between EU law and national law – specifically, the state's obligation to ensure its observance and its compatibility with EU law, thereby enabling citizens to rely on it in actions against the state or against public bodies; an "emanation of the state" as defined in Foster v. British Gas plc.

Horizontal direct effect concerns the relationship between individuals (including companies). If a certain provision of EU law is horizontally directly effective, then citizens are able to rely on it in actions against each other. This indicates that a citizen is able to rely on a provision from the EU law against another citizen before the national court. These obligations can create rights for or be imposed on citizens in the Member State. Unlike treaty articles and regulations, Directives are usually incapable of being horizontally directly effective. Certain provisions of the treaties and legislative acts such as regulations are capable of being directly enforced horizontally.

== Application of direct effect ==
=== Treaty articles ===
Direct effect is applicable when the particular provision relied on fulfils the Van Gend en Loos criteria. It is therefore applicable in the case of treaty articles (Van Gend en Loos was a claim based on a treaty article), in which case it can be both vertically and horizontally directly effective.

=== Regulations ===
Regulations are also subject to direct effect. As Article 288 TFEU (ex Art 249 TEC) explicitly provides that regulations "Shall be binding in its entirety and directly applicable in all Member States" the ECJ has confirmed that they are therefore in principle directly effective stating that "Owing to their very nature and their place in the system of sources of Union law, regulations operate to confer rights on individuals which the national courts have a duty to protect" If a specific right is conferred therefore a regulation can be both vertically and horizontally directly effective. All regulations are directly effective.

=== Decisions ===
Decisions are directly effective against whomever they are addressed to, as under Article 288 TFEU (ex Article 249 TEC), they are "binding in its entirety... to whom [they are] addressed".

=== Directives ===
The landmark judgments on the direct effect of Directives are Van Duyn v Home Office, which established vertical direct effect of Directives, and Marshall v Southampton Health Authority, which established that there is no horizontal direct effect of unimplemented directives.

The horizontal direct effect of Directives is a contentious issue. Numerous Advocates General have supported the case for establishing horizontal direct effect. However, the ECJ has always resisted a change of the Marshall case law so as to allow a general right to invoke on unimplemented directives against private parties. In a number of cases the ECJ has established means for limiting the scope of the prohibition of horizontal direct effect, and ensure the full effectiveness of directives as much as possible.

The case of Foster v British Gas demonstrates the court's willingness to confer the rights of a directive unto individuals, for the purpose of this case the court purported that any government organisation, nationalised company or company working in the public sector can be considered as a public body for the purpose of implementing vertical direct effect when a more narrow reading of the case might infer that horizontal direct effect would need to required for application. This is demonstrated in the case of Van Colson where the court established the practice of 'reading in' a directive into existing national law to realise the directive's effect – despite it not actually being a part of the legislation. Further case law to demonstrate this practice is Francovich v Italy, where action could be taken against the government by an individual for their failure to implement a directive and the subsequent loss of rights suffered in court.

In Grad v Finanzamt Traunstein, a case involving VAT, the ECJ ruled that a decision could be directly effective, as they imposed an obligation to achieve a required result. As the ECJ held in Becker, another case involving VAT, "wherever the provisions of a directive appear...to be unconditional and sufficiently precise, those provisions may, in the absence of implementing measures adopted within the prescribed period, be relied upon as against any national provision which is incompatible with the directive or insofar as the provisions define rights which individuals are able to assert against the State."

In Pubblico Ministero v. Ratti, however, it was held that if the time limit given for the implementation of the directive has not expired, it cannot have direct effect. Directives were directly effective only if the prescribed date, by which the Member State should have implemented it, had passed. Additionally, in instances where the Member State has introduced the required legislation, but has done so defectively, the directive may still be directly effective, as in the Verbond van Nederlandse Ondernemingen (VNO) case.

Unlike Treaty provisions and regulations, directives cannot have horizontal effect (against another private individual or company), as this is adjudged contrary to the principles of legality and legal certainty (see Marshall v Southampton Health Authority). As such, Directives are currently only vertically directly effective (i.e. against the state, a concept interpreted broadly by the ECJ, including state schools and other "emanations of the state"). However, the obligation of EU Member States to interpret national law in a consistent and harmonious manner with EU law has been said to have produced an indirect horizontal effect regarding directives. Furthermore, in the judgments CIA Security and Unilever Italia SpA v Central Food SpA, the ECJ allowed a private party to rely on the Notification Directive against another private party. Academic commentary has typically referred to these cases as involving "incidental effects" of directives against private parties, as opposed to full-blown horizontal direct effect. However, the exact distinction between "incidental effects" and "horizontal direct effect" has proved difficult to draw. According to recent case law and commentary, it appears a directive can be invoked against a private party insofar as this does not affect the norm(s) directly governing the dispute at hand.

== Direct effect on procedural law ==
In Comet v. Produktschap, the European Court of Justice established that the procedural rules of each member state generally apply to cases of EU law. However, two basic principles must be adhered to, namely the "principle of equivalence" (the procedure for EU cases must be equivalent to the procedure for domestic cases), and the "principle of effectiveness" (the procedure cannot render the law functionally ineffective).

== See also ==
- Self-executing right
