= Debra A. Murphy =

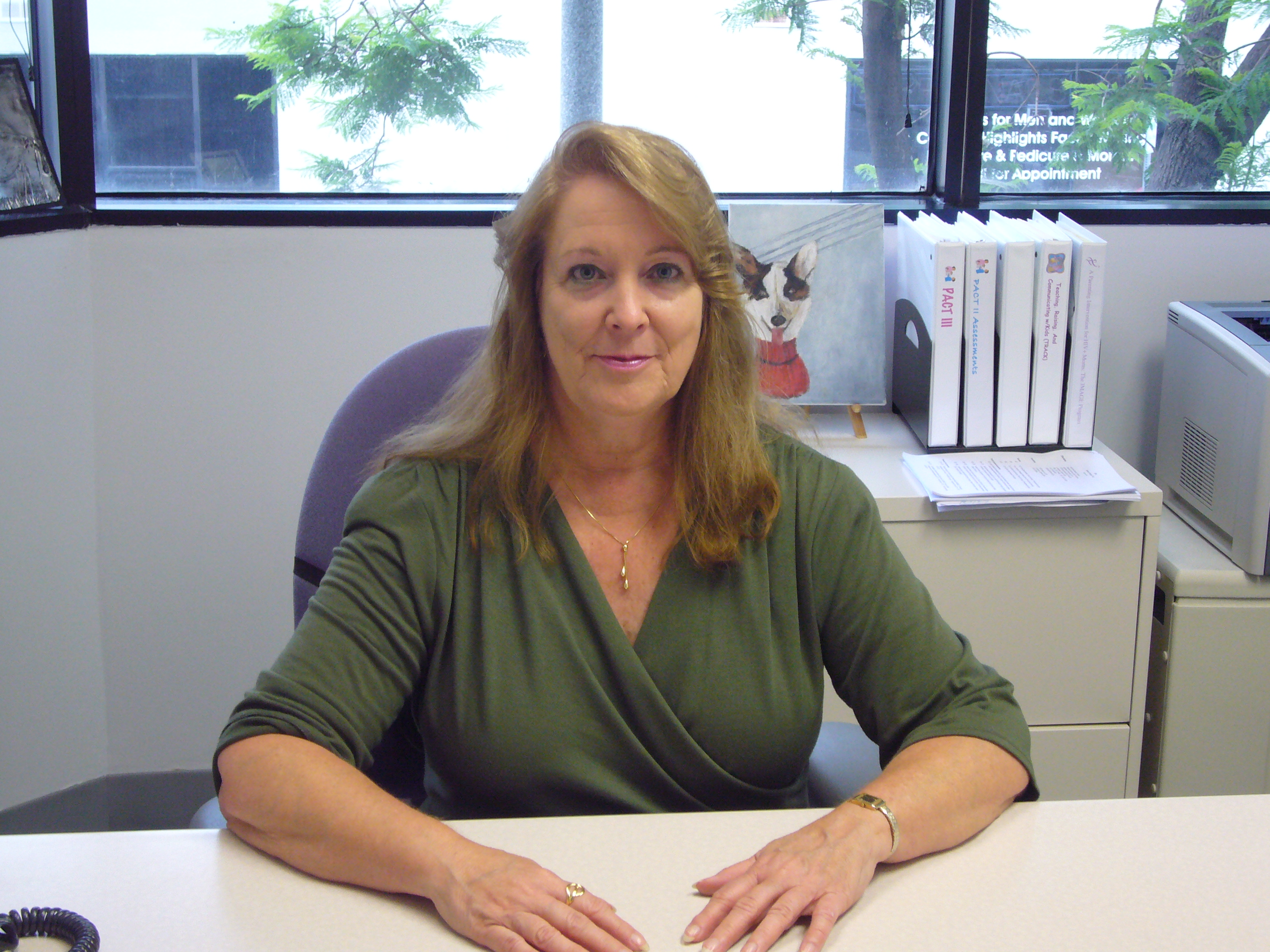
Debra Murphy at desk

Debra A. Murphy is a Professor Emerita at the University of California, Los Angeles in the Department of Psychiatry.

== Education ==
Murphy received her B.A in Psychiatry and M.S. in Clinical Psychology from the San Diego State University of California. She enrolled in the Florida State University of Tallahassee in Florida and in 1987 she attained her Ph.D. in Clinical Psychology.

== Research and career ==
Murphy has conducted Human Immunodeficiency Virus/Acquired immunodeficiency syndrome behavioral research on people of all ages over the past 30 years and her main area of research are: (1) children and adolescents affected by maternal HIV/AIDS; (2) mental health among HIV-positive adolescents and high-risk adolescents, and medication adherence among infected adolescents; and (3) assessment of children and adolescents.

Murphy conducted the first longitudinal follow-up study of children affected by maternal HIV/AIDS. In 1997 she began the 5-year “Parents And children Coping Together” study (PACT; community title), funded by the National Institute of Mental Health. PACT was the first prospective study examining the impact of maternal HIV/AIDS on children and on the mother-child relationship.

PACT was the first prospective study examining the impact of maternal HIV/AIDS on children and on the mother-child relationship. Most importantly, it was the first cohort of children affected by maternal HIV/AIDS followed all the way from early school age through late adolescence/early adulthood, and thus the only group of children in the United States to be followed continuously as they grew up to adulthood while living with a mother with HIV/AIDS. Findings from the PACT study were used to develop several funded intervention trials. Three of these interventions are of note.

The first intervention study, funded in January 2007 by NIMH (R01MH077493), was to develop and conduct a 3-year pilot study of a disclosure intervention for HIV-positive mothers with young children (community title: Teaching, Raising, And Communicating with Kids; the TRACK study). Murphy developed the TRACK intervention and conducted a randomized controlled trial of the intervention.

The second intervention study that stemmed from Murphy’s longitudinal PACT observational study was funded by NIMH in 2010 (R01MH086329), entitled “A Parenting Intervention for HIV+ Moms: The IMAGE Program.” IMAGE stood for Improving Mothers’ parenting Abilities, Growth, and Effectiveness. The study was designed to develop and pilot test a self-care and parenting intervention for HIV-positive mothers with young children. Murphy wrote the IMAGE intervention and conducted a randomized controlled trial of it; results showed significant effects of the intervention for improving parenting practices for mothers in the intervention condition. The intervention also improved family outcomes and improvements in the parent-child relationship. Thus, IMAGE had a positive impact on parenting behaviors, and on maternal, child, and family outcomes. IMAGE has since been successfully translated and used in Iran.

Finally, the third intervention was a follow-up to the TRACK pilot study, given the efficacy of the pilot trial in terms of improving the number disclosures among mothers living with HIV/AIDS to their young children. A full-scale, two-city trial of TRACK was funded, with Murphy as the Principal Investigator at the Southern California site (centered at UCLA), and was conducted in two distinct geographical areas of the country with diverse ethnic/racial populations (NIMH R01MH09418 & R01MH09423).

== Awards and honors ==
In 1996, she was awarded with C. Everett Koop National Health Award for an HIV Prevention Program for High-Risk, Inner-City Women. She has been a member of various professional societies including the American Psychological Association (APA), International AIDS Society, and International Society for Research in Child & Adolescent Psychopathology.
