= R (Equal Opportunities Commission) v Secretary of State for Employment =

R (EOC) v Secretary of State for Employment
- Court: UK House of Lords
- Citation: [1995] 1 AC 1, [1994] IRLR 176

Keywords
- Judicial review

R (Equal Opportunities Commission) v Secretary of State for Employment [1995] 1 AC 1 is a UK constitutional law case, concerning judicial review.

== Facts ==
The United Kingdom had a 16 hour per week threshold for all employment protection legislation, and if one had worked for 5 years in a job before a dismissal, the threshold was reduced to 8 hours per week. From 1979 to 1987 the numbers of part time workers grew 30% and the numbers working under 16 hours grew 66%, to 11% of the labour force. In 1994 38% of women part time workers, amounting to 1.9m people were under the threshold. Did this infringe TEC art 119 (TFEU art 157) and the EU Equal Treatment Directive 76/207/EEC? The EOC wished to argue that rules over redundancy pay and unfair dismissal were discriminatory and breached EC law.

== Judgment ==
The House of Lords held that the hourly threshold contravened the EU law on equal treatment of men and women. The EOC had sufficient interest to gain standing under SDA 1975 s 53. It held that the Secretary of State had not discharged the onus of showing that the threshold did not infringe art 157, applying Bilka-Kaufhaus and Rinner-Kuhn.

Lord Keith said that if the EOC did now win it would ‘agitate in judicial review proceedings questions related to sex discrimination which are of public importance and affect a large section of the population.’ He accepted that the promotion of job opportunities was an appropriate goal for employment legislation (or lack of it?) but the Secretary of State had not presented ‘anything capable of being regarded as factual evidence’ to support the contention. There was also no evidence to show that the 16 hour threshold reduced administrative burdens.

Lords Jauncey, Lowry, Browne-Wilkinson and Slynn concurred.

== See also ==
- United Kingdom constitutional law
