= Rosemary Kayess =

Australian human rights lawyer

Rosemary Kayess (born 1963) is an Australian human rights lawyer, disability rights activist, researcher and academic. She is a senior research fellow at the University of New South Wales Faculty of Law and the chair of the UN Committee on the Rights of Persons with Disabilities, having contributed to the Convention on the Rights of Persons with Disabilities in 2004. Kayess has also been the director of several non-governmental organizations throughout her career, advocating for disability rights and the implementation of the UN convention in Australia and abroad. She was awarded the Australian Human Rights Medal in 2019 for her contributions to human rights in Australia.

== Early life and education ==
Kayess graduated from UNSW with a Bachelor of Social Sciences (Hons) in 1994 and a Bachelor of Laws in 2004. She subsequently earned an Associate Diploma of Management (Community Organisations) and a Graduate Diploma of Legal Practice from the College of Law.

=== Accident ===
At the age of 20, Kayess sustained a spinal injury in a car accident, which brought about her disability and led to her to become a disability rights activist. In an interview with Floyd Alexander-Hunt, Kayess said she became interested in disability policy because it was what she “understood and could relate to”. She also said that having a disability kept her on a “less traditional academic path” because of physical access and flexibility.

== Career ==
=== Early career ===
From 1989 to 1995, Kayess became director of Spinal Cord Injuries Australia and director of the Physical Disability Council of New South Wales. Also, during this period, she served on the Ethics Committee at the Benevolent Society.

In 1995, she became chairperson of the Australian Centre for Disability Law, an organisation that provided legal advocacy to people with disabilities. From 1996 to 2000, Kayess served on the Disability Council of New South Wales.

=== Drafting of UN Convention and advocacy work ===
In 2004, Kayess was appointed to the Australian Government delegation that drafted the Convention on the Rights of Persons with Disabilities. After drafting the Convention, Kayess advocated for its ratification in Australia at workshops and human rights forums. The convention was ultimately ratified in 2008 by the government of Kevin Rudd.

From 2008 to 2009, Kayess served as the director of the Disability Studies and Research Centre at the University of New South Wales. In this role, she contributed to public commentary and analysis on the effects of unemployment, and limited access to further education, on people with disabilities.

Kayess was also a speaker at the 2009 Protecting Human Rights Conference held at the Gilbert + Tobin Centre of Public Law at the University of New South Wales. Kayess discussed human rights violations against people with disabilities, including the lack of adequate accommodation, forced institutional care, and educational segregation. Kayess’ work continues to explore these issues in Australia and internationally.

Since 2009, Kayess has been a member of the disability reference group for the Department of Foreign Affairs and Trade’s AusAID.

In 2010, Kayess was appointed director of the Human Rights and Disability Project at the Australian Human Rights Centre at the University of New South Wales' Faculty of Law. From 2010 to 2014, Kayess was a senior visiting research fellow on the Disability Rights Expanding Accessible Markets Project (DREAM). The project’s stated aim was to assist the European Union and its member states in implementing the Convention on the Rights of Persons with Disabilities.

In 2011, Kayess joined the Social Policy Research Centre at the University of New South Wales as a senior research fellow. She remained in this role until her appointment to the Australian Human Rights Commissioner in 2024.

=== Later career ===
In January 2018, Kayess became the interim director at the Disability Innovation Institute at the University of New South Wales. Here, she drove research for innovative initiatives across all faculties and disciplines to help transform the lives of people with disabilities.

In 2018, Kayess became the first Australian woman to be elected to the United Nations Committee on the Rights of Persons with Disabilities, which monitors the implementation of the Convention on the Rights of Persons with Disabilities. In March 2019, she was appointed vice-chair of the committee in recognition of her academic experience and expertise in Australia and internationally. On 8 March 2021, International Women’s Day, Kayess was elected the committee chairperson. She has advised on the implementation of the Convention in Australia, the Asia-Pacific and Europe.

On 24 January 2024, Kayess was appointed as the Australian Disability Discrimination Commissioner for a term of five years.

== Personal life ==
Kayess enjoys listening to music outside of work and has described herself as “a tragic for indie pop”.

== Honours and awards ==
In 1996, Kayess was honoured with a University of New South Wales Alumni Award. In 2019, Kayess won the Australian Human Rights Commission’s Human Rights Medal for her “outstanding contribution to the promotion and protection of human rights in Australia.” In 2021 she received an honorary doctorate from the University of Basel.
