= Anti-discrimination laws in Australia =

Anti-discrimination laws in Australia have been enacted at both federal and state/territory levels to outlaw discrimination and harassment in a range of areas of public life. Federal law operate concurrently with state/territory laws, so both sets of laws must be followed.

== Federal law ==
The Parliament of Australia has enacted a number of anti-discrimination laws relying on the external affairs power of the Australian Constitution. These include:

- Age Discrimination Act 2004
- Disability Discrimination Act 1992
- Racial Discrimination Act 1975
- Sex Discrimination Act 1984

Complaints for unlawful discrimination under one of the federal laws can be made to the Australian Human Rights Commission under the Australian Human Rights Commission Act 1986.

== State and territory laws ==
Each state and territory has its own anti-discrimination law which operates alongside the federal laws:

- Australian Capital Territory – Discrimination Act 1991
- New South Wales – Anti-Discrimination Act 1977
- Northern Territory – Anti-Discrimination Act 1992
- Queensland – Anti-Discrimination Act 1991
- South Australia – Equal Opportunity Act 1984
- Tasmania – Anti-Discrimination Act 1998
- Victoria – Equal Opportunity Act 2010 and Racial and Religious Tolerance Act 2001
- Western Australia – Equal Opportunity Act 1984
