= Van Duyn v Home Office =

European Court of Justice case

- European Court of Justice

Submitted 1 March 1974 Decided 4 December 1974
- Full case name: Yvonne van Duyn v Home Office.
- Case: 41/74
- CelexID: 61974CJ0041
- ECLI: ECLI:EU:C:1974:133
- Case type: Reference for a preliminary ruling
- Nationality of parties: The Netherlands; United Kingdom
- Procedural history: [1975] Ch 358

Court composition
- Judge-Rapporteur; Max Sørensen
- Advocate General; Henri Mayras

Legislation affecting
- Arts. 48 and 177 TEEC

Van Duyn v Home Office (1974) C-41/74 was a case of the European Court of Justice concerning the free movement of workers between member states.

== Facts ==
Van Duyn, a Dutch national, claimed the British Government, through the Home Secretary, infringed TFEU article 45(3) (then TEEC art 48(3)) by denying her an entry permit to work at the Church of Scientology. The Free Movement of Workers Directive 64/221/EC article 3(1) also set out that a public policy provision had to be 'based exclusively on the personal conduct of the individual concerned'. The UK had not done anything to expressly implement this element of the Directive. The government had believed Scientology to be harmful to mental health, and discouraged it but did not make it illegal. She sued, citing the Treaty of Rome and Community law, arguing that the Directive should apply to bind the UK. She was not being refused because of 'personal conduct'. Pennycuick VC referred the case to the European Court of Justice. The Home Office argued the provision was not directly effective, because it left the Government the discretion to apply exceptions to free movement.

== Judgement ==
The European Court of Justice held that van Duyn could be denied entry if it was for reasons related to her personal conduct, as outlined in the Directive 64/22/EEC. TEEC article 48 was directly effective, even though the application of the provision was 'subject to judicial control'. Furthermore, the Directive was directly effective against the UK government. First, it would be incompatible with the binding effect of Directives to exclude the possibility of direct effect. Second, the practical efficacy of the Directive would be reduced unless individuals could invoke them before national courts. Third, because the ECJ has jurisdiction to give preliminary rulings under TFEU article 267 (then TEEC article 177) on 'acts of the institutions... of the Union' this implied all acts should be directly effective.

9. The second question asks the court to say whether Council Directive 64/221 of February 25, 1964, on the co-ordination of special measures concerning the movement and residence of foreign nationals which are justified on grounds of public policy, public security or public health is directly applicable so as to confer on individuals rights enforceable by them in the courts of a member state.

10. It emerges from the order making the reference that the only provision of the Directive which is relevant is that contained in article 3 (1) which provides:

"Measures taken on grounds of public policy or public security shall be based exclusively on the personal conduct of the individual concerned."

11. The United Kingdom observes that, since article 189 of the Treaty distinguishes between the effects ascribed to regulations, directives and decisions, it must therefore be presumed that the Council, in issuing a directive rather than making a regulation, must have intended that the directive should have an effect other than that of a regulation and accordingly that the former should not be directly applicable.

12. If, however, by virtue of the provisions of article 189 regulations are directly applicable and, consequently, may by their very nature have direct effects, it does not follow from this that other categories of acts mentioned in that article can never have similar effects. It would be incompatible with the binding effect attributed to a directive by article 189 to exclude, in principle, the possibility that the obligation which it imposes may be invoked by those concerned. In particular, where the community authorities have, by directive, imposed on member states the obligation to pursue a particular course of conduct, the useful effect of such an act would be weakened if individuals were prevented from relying on it before their national courts and if the latter were prevented from taking it into consideration as an element of community law. Article 177, which empowers national courts to refer to the court questions concerning the validity and interpretation of all acts of the community institutions, without distinction, implies furthermore that these acts may be invoked by individuals in the national courts. It is necessary to examine, in every case, whether the nature, general scheme and wording of the provision in question are capable of having direct effects on the relations between member states and individuals.

13. By providing that measures taken on grounds of public policy shall be based exclusively on the personal conduct of the individual concerned, article 3 (1) of Directive 64/221 is intended to limit the discretionary power which national laws generally confer on the authorities responsible for the entry and expulsion of foreign nationals. First, the provision lays down an obligation which is not subject to any exception or condition and which, by its very nature, does not require the intervention of any act on the part either of the institutions of the community or of member states. Secondly, because member states are thereby obliged, in implementing a clause which derogates from one of the fundamental principles of the Treaty in favour of individuals, not to take account of factors extraneous to personal conduct, legal certainty for the persons concerned requires that they should be able to rely on this obligation even though it has been laid down in a legislative act which has no automatic direct effect in its entirety.

Crucially, the ECJ proceeded to permit the UK's derogation, thereby approving (on this occasion) the UK's decision to ban Ms Duyn because Scientology was then deemed by the UK to be harmful and undesirable:

3 . Article 48 of the EEC treaty and Article 3 ( 1 ) of Directive no 64/221 must be interpreted as meaning that a Member State, in imposing restrictions justified on grounds of public policy, is entitled to take into account as a matter of personal conduct of the individual concerned, the fact that the individual is associated with some body or organization the activities of which the member state considers socially harmful but which are not unlawful in that state, despite the fact that no restriction is placed upon nationals of the said Member State who wish to take similar employment with the same body or organization.

== Significance ==
The main significance of the case is not the decision itself, but the fact that ECJ held that EU directives can have direct effect on an individual. The Court laid down in its judgment that a directive has direct effect when its provisions are unconditional and sufficiently clear and precise and when the EU Member State has not transposed the directive by the deadline. The Court reasoned that if the directive did not have direct effect, then it would lose its relevance. Therefore, directives had to have direct effect.

They changed their reasoning later in Pubblico Ministero v Ratti, but the principle persisted.

== See also ==
- EU law
- Direct effect
