= Association belge des Consommateurs Test-Achats ASBL v Conseil des ministres =

2011 decision of the European Court of Justice

Test-Achats ASBL v Conseil des ministres
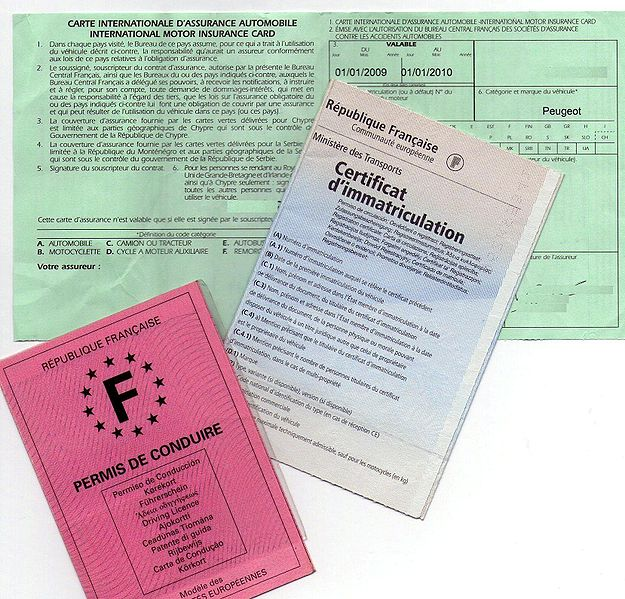
- Court: European Court of Justice
- Citations: (2011) C-236/09, ECLI:EU:C:2011:100

Keywords
- Human rights

Association belge des Consommateurs Test-Achats ASBL v Conseil des ministres (2011) C-236/09, ECLI:EU:C:2011:100, is a decision of the European Court of Justice which invalidated a provision of Directive 2004/113/EC of the European Union which permitted the continence of sexual discrimination in the provision of insurance services provided that it was based on "relevant and accurate actuarial and statistical data." The practical result of the decision was the prohibition of sexual discrimination in insurance policies.

== Facts ==
A Belgian consumer association, Test-Achats, against the Belgian government claiming that the legal measure adopted by the government to transpose the Gender Directive into EU law violated the Charter of Fundamental Rights of the European Union. The Constitutional Court asked the European Court of Justice for a preliminary ruling on the validity of Article 5(2) of the directive.

== Judgment ==
On 1 March 2011 the ECJ ruled in favour of Test-Achats that Article 5(2) was in breach of the Charter of Fundamental Rights and therefore void. However the court ruled that there would be a transitional period to enable insurance companies to comply with the ruling this lasted until the 21 December 2012.

The ruling means that after the transitional period ended all new insurance contracts entered into in the 27 European Union member states could no longer use sex to determine premiums paid or benefits granted. The ruling benefits male drivers and male purchasers of life insurance, who tend to experience claims more than women in these areas; it will also benefit female purchasers of health insurance who tend to experience health claims more than men and female purchasers of life annuity products, who tend to live longer than men. Naturally it is likely that female drivers and life insurance purchasers, and male health insurance purchasers, will pay more.

The ruling was welcomed by many as a step forward for gender equality and for ending outdated practices but met with some controversy particularly from United Kingdom conservative politicians who felt the court was overstepping its power and in effect making its own legislation.

== See also ==
- EU law
