= Nicholas Aroney =

Australian constitutional lawyer and legal scholar

Nicholas Aroney FASSA FAAL
- Known for: Australian constitutional history and theory; comparative federalism; religious freedom
- Awards: Mollie Holman Doctoral Medal (2002)

Academic background
- Education: University of New South Wales (BA); University of Queensland (LLB (Hons), LLM); Monash University (PhD)
- Thesis: The Federal Commonwealth of Australia: A Study in the Formation of its Constitution (2001)

Academic work
- Discipline: Law
- Sub-discipline: Constitutional law, comparative constitutional law, legal theory, federalism, law and religion
- Institutions: University of Queensland
- Notable works: The Constitution of a Federal Commonwealth (2009)

Nicholas Aroney is an Australian constitutional lawyer and legal theorist. He is professor of Constitutional Law at the University of Queensland (UQ); director (Public Law) of the university's Centre for Public, International and Comparative Law; and a senior fellow of the Center for the Study of Law and Religion at Emory University.

Aroney's scholarship concerns Australian and comparative constitutional law, federalism, constitutional theory, legal history and the relationship between law and religion. His monograph The Constitution of a Federal Commonwealth (2009), developed from a doctoral thesis awarded Monash University's Mollie Holman Doctoral Medal, examines the making and meaning of the Australian Constitution. He has published more than 160 books, journal articles and book chapters, and is a fellow of both the Academy of the Social Sciences in Australia and the Australian Academy of Law.

Aroney has been appointed to several governmental reviews, including the Queensland review of the Crime and Misconduct Act 2001 with former High Court justice Ian Callinan, the federal Religious Freedom Review of 2017–18, and the first statutory strategic review of the Electoral Commission of Queensland in 2026. In 2026 he became lead investigator of an international research project on human-rights agencies funded by the John Templeton Foundation.

== Education and early career ==
Aroney graduated with a Bachelor of Arts in political science from the University of New South Wales in 1989. He then studied law at the University of Queensland, completing a Bachelor of Laws with honours in 1992 and a research Master of Laws in 1994, with a thesis on freedom of speech, constitutional implications and the role of the judiciary. He received his PhD from Monash University in 2001 for a thesis entitled The Federal Commonwealth of Australia: A Study in the Formation of its Constitution, which was awarded the university's Mollie Holman Doctoral Medal in 2002.

Before entering academia, Aroney was an articled clerk at Minter Ellison and then a consulting solicitor in building and construction law.

== Academic career ==
Aroney joined the UQ law school in 1995. He was a senior lecturer from 2001 to 2006 and a reader from 2007 to 2009, and was appointed Professor of Constitutional Law in 2010. He served as associate dean (research) of the law school from 2010 to 2011.

He has held visiting positions at the universities of Oxford, Cambridge, Paris II, Edinburgh, Durham, Padua, Sydney, Emory and Tilburg.

Aroney was editor of the University of Queensland Law Journal from 2003 to 2005 and of the International Trade and Business Law Annual from 1996 to 1998, and is a former secretary of the Australian Society of Legal Philosophy. He is a past member of the governing council of the Australian Association of Constitutional Law and co-convenor of its Queensland chapter. He is a member of the editorial advisory boards of the American Journal of Jurisprudence, the Public Law Review, the Australian Journal of Law and Religion and the International Trade and Business Law Review.

== Scholarship ==
=== Constitutional law and federalism ===
Much of Aroney's scholarship concerns the theory, history and institutional design of federal constitutions. The Constitution of a Federal Commonwealth: The Making and Meaning of the Australian Constitution (Cambridge University Press, 2009) examined the intellectual and political foundations of the Australian Constitution and the federal settlement adopted at Federation. Reviewing the book in The Journal of Legislative Studies, political scientist John Uhr described Aroney as a "leading Australian constitutional scholar" and the work as an "important book".

With Peter Gerangelos, James Stellios and Sarah Murray, Aroney co-authored The Constitution of the Commonwealth of Australia: History, Principle and Interpretation (Cambridge University Press, 2015), which carries a foreword by then Chief Justice of Australia Robert French. A review in the International Journal of Constitutional Law described it as "a constitutional scholar's delight".

His comparative work includes the edited collections The Future of Australian Federalism (2012), Courts in Federal Countries: Federalists or Unitarists? (2017), The Routledge Handbook of Subnational Constitutions and Constitutionalism (2021) and Federalism in a Turbulent Era (2026).

In 2010 Aroney was awarded an Australian Research Council Future Fellowship for research reconceiving Australian federalism through its fundamental values, comparative models and constitutional interpretation. He has also held ARC Discovery Project funding for research on multicultural accommodation in federal systems (2012–2017) and on constituent power in federal constitutions (2022–2026).

=== Law and religion ===
Aroney has written extensively on freedom of religion, church–state relations, legal pluralism and the legal position of religious associations. His work in this field includes the article "Freedom of Religion as an Associational Right" (University of Queensland Law Journal, 2014), the collection Shari'a in the West (Oxford University Press, 2010), edited with Rex Ahdar, and Christianity and Constitutionalism (Oxford University Press, 2022), edited with Ian Leigh, which brought together scholars of law, history, political thought and theology to examine the relationship between Christianity and constitutional government.

=== Human-rights agencies project ===
In 2026 Aroney received a grant of A$1,203,445 from the John Templeton Foundation to lead the project Benchmarking Human Rights Agencies: How Should They Balance Competing Rights?, with Joel Harrison of the University of Sydney as deputy leader. Running from August 2026 to May 2029, the project involves 17 researchers from Australia, North America, Europe, Asia and Africa, and examines how human-rights agencies resolve conflicts between rights to equality and non-discrimination and freedoms of speech, association and religion. UQ described it as the first comprehensive international benchmarking study of its kind; planned outputs include a comparative report, scholarly publications and training resources for human-rights institutions.

Aroney discussed the project on ABC Radio National's Religion and Ethics Report in September 2026.

== Public commentary ==
=== 2023 Voice referendum ===
Aroney contributed to legal debate on the 2023 Australian Indigenous Voice referendum, focusing on the constitutional implications of the proposed section 129. In April 2023 he and Peter Gerangelos made a joint submission to the parliamentary Joint Select Committee on the Aboriginal and Torres Strait Islander Voice Referendum, addressing the recognition of Aboriginal and Torres Strait Islander peoples as the First Peoples of Australia, the scope of the Voice's representations, its relationship with executive government and the interpretation of Parliament's power under the proposed section. He presented a paper on the constitutional implications of recognising Australia's First Peoples to the 33rd national conference of the Samuel Griffith Society in August 2023.

With Peter Congdon, Aroney argued that proposed section 129(iii) could reasonably be read as a new head of Commonwealth legislative power, authorising laws implementing the Voice's representations even where no other head of power applied, with potential consequences for the federal division of powers.

=== Constitutional interpretation ===
On 7 September 2026 Aroney appeared with former High Court justice Michael Kirby and United States circuit judge Andrew Oldham in a public dialogue at NSW Parliament House on whether the Constitution is a living document, moderated by Rosalind Dixon and produced by John Anderson Media with Australian Dialogues. The panel compared originalism and living constitutionalism in Australian and American practice; Aroney defended an approach giving substantial weight to constitutional text, legal history and original public meaning.

== Public service ==
The Queensland Government appointed Aroney and Ian Callinan in 2012 to review the Crime and Misconduct Act 2001 and the operation of the Crime and Misconduct Commission; their report was delivered in March 2013.

Aroney was a member of the five-person expert panel, chaired by former Attorney-General Philip Ruddock and appointed by Prime Minister Malcolm Turnbull, that conducted the Religious Freedom Review of 2017–18. The panel, which also comprised Rosalind Croucher, Annabelle Bennett and Frank Brennan, received more than 15,000 submissions and reported to the Prime Minister on 18 May 2018.

In 2026 the Queensland Government appointed Aroney as the independent reviewer for the first strategic review of the Electoral Commission of Queensland under section 33A of the Electoral Act 1992. The review assesses whether the Commission's functions are being performed economically, effectively and efficiently, and its findings are to be tabled in the Parliament of Queensland.

== Honours ==
- Mollie Holman Doctoral Medal, Monash University (2002)
- Fellow of the Australian Academy of Law (2023)
- Fellow of the Academy of the Social Sciences in Australia (2023)

== Selected works ==
- Aroney, Nicholas (1998). Freedom of Speech in the Constitution. Centre for Independent Studies. ISBN 186432032X.
- Aroney, Nicholas (2009). The Constitution of a Federal Commonwealth: The Making and Meaning of the Australian Constitution. Cambridge University Press. ISBN 9780521716895.
- Ahdar, Rex; Aroney, Nicholas, eds. (2010). Shari'a in the West. Oxford University Press.
- Appleby, Gabrielle; Aroney, Nicholas; John, Thomas, eds. (2012). The Future of Australian Federalism: Comparative and Interdisciplinary Perspectives. Cambridge University Press.
- Aroney, Nicholas; Gerangelos, Peter; Murray, Sarah; Stellios, James (2015). The Constitution of the Commonwealth of Australia: History, Principle and Interpretation. Cambridge University Press.
- Aroney, Nicholas; Kincaid, John, eds. (2017). Courts in Federal Countries: Federalists or Unitarists?. University of Toronto Press. ISBN 9781487500627.
- Popelier, Patricia; Delledonne, Giacomo; Aroney, Nicholas, eds. (2021). The Routledge Handbook of Subnational Constitutions and Constitutionalism. Routledge.
- Aroney, Nicholas; Leigh, Ian, eds. (2022). Christianity and Constitutionalism. Oxford University Press. ISBN 9780197587256.
- Aroney, Nicholas; Costa, Renato, eds. (2026). Federalism in a Turbulent Era. Edward Elgar Publishing.
