= Directive 76/207/EEC =

European Union directive on gender equality

The Equal Treatment Directive 76/207/EEC was a directive that applied in the European Union until 2009, when it was repealed by Directive 2006/54/EC.

== History ==
Directive 76/207/EEC was created on 9 February 1976 on the implementation of the principle of equal treatment for men and women in access to employment, vocational training and promotion, and working conditions.

It was the subject of the landmark case Foster v British Gas plc. It had been previously established that European Union directives can be directly enforceable against the state if they have not been correctly and fully transposed into national law within the time allowed. The judgment in this case established that such direct enforceability applies not only against the state but also against emanations of the state.

== See also ==
- EU law
- List of European Union directives
