= Brandy v Human Rights and Equal Opportunity Commission =

Judgement of the High Court of Australia

- Court: High Court of Australia
- Decided: 23 February 1995
- Citations: [1995] HCA 10, (1995) 183 CLR 245
- Transcripts: [1994] HCATrans 51 (4 October 1994) [1994] HCATrans 57 (11 October 1994)

Case history
- Prior actions: Bell v ATSIC, Gray & Brandy [1993] HREOCA 25 (22 December 1993)

Court membership
- Judges sitting: Mason CJ, Brennan, Deane, Dawson, Toohey, Gaudron and McHugh JJ

Case opinions
- (7:0) The 1992 and 1993 amendments to the Racial Discrimination Act 1975 purported to vest judicial power in the Commission contrary to Ch III of the Constitution and hence were invalid.

Brandy v Human Rights and Equal Opportunity Commission (HREOC) was a case before the High Court of Australia determining that the HREOC could not validly exercise judicial power. The High Court maintained a firm position against attempts to confer judicial powers upon non-judicial bodies.

== Background ==
Up until 1992, Australia's Human Rights and Equal Opportunity Commission, in response to complaints of racial discrimination lodged in accordance with the Racial Discrimination Act 1975 (Cth) (the RDA), was able to make determinations. These were voluntary, and in the event complainants chose not to comply with them, there was no mechanism for enforcement. The only option available to complainants was to make an application to the Federal Court to have the matter re-heard.

In 1988 Wilcox J criticised this process, in his judgment in Maynard v Neilson, as being costly and unnecessarily repetitive. This prompted the federal government to amend the RDA to rectify the problem. The sections which these amendments introduced into Part III of the RDA allowed for determinations made by the HREOC to be registered with the Federal Court. These determinations, upon registration, would have the effect of being an order made by the Federal Court, unless a respondent applied for a review.

=== Facts ===
In the Brandy case, Harry Brandy and John Bell were both officers of the Aboriginal and Torres Strait Islander Commission (ATSIC). Bell lodged a complaint against Brandy and ATSIC with the HREOC alleging contraventions to the RDA. The HREOC conducted an inquiry and handed down a determination that both Brandy and ATSIC were to pay compensation to Bell and to apologise to him. This determination was registered with the Federal Court, prompting Brandy to firstly seek a review and secondly to make an application to the High Court for the present case.

== Legal issue ==
The question came before the Full Court as a result of a case stated by Gaudron J, whether "In consequence of the amendments embodied in the Sex Discrimination and other Legislation Amendment Act 1992 and/or the Law and Justice Legislation Amendment Act 1993 as they affect the Racial Discrimination Act 1975 are any, and if so which, of the provisions of Part III of the Racial Discrimination Act 1975 invalid?"

== Judgment and outcome of the case ==
A unanimous decision was returned by the High Court through two judgments, one by Mason CJ, Brennan and Toohey JJ, the other by Deane, Dawson, Gaudron and McHugh JJ. The court found that sections 25ZAB, 25ZAC and 25ZC of the RDA which had been implemented by the two prior mentioned amendments were invalid. Deane, Dawson, Gaudron and McHugh JJ also declared section 25ZAA to be invalid. The other judges did not consider this issue.

This decision was formulated from the consideration of the definition of judicial power, the starting point of which was noted to be the judgment of Griffith CJ in the case of Huddart, Parker & Co Pty Ltd v Moorehead. This case encapsulated a definition of judicial power which included binding and authoritative decisions of controversies between subjects by Chapter III courts of the Constitution.

The key factor in the decision of the sections being deemed invalid was the enforceability of the determinations. Deane, Dawson, Gaudron and McHugh JJ stated that "if it were not for the provisions providing the registration and enforcement of the Commission's determinations, it would be plain that the Commission does not exercise judicial power". Thus, prior to the inclusion of the amendments, the HREOC was not exercising judicial power upon making determinations with regards to complaints of discrimination. By allowing determinations to be registered with the Federal Court to effectively become as an order from that court was to make the determinations enforceable. This was thought by the court to be an exercise of judicial power by a body which could not be vested with such power. This is because the HREOC was not a court in accordance with sections 71 and 72 of the Constitution and thus not a Chapter III court able of exercising judicial power.

The case of Brandy is constitutionally significant firstly because its decision re-emphasises the limited number of bodies which are permitted to exercise judicial power. The decision of Brandy emphasised the fact that non-judicial tribunals and other administrative bodies which did not constitute a Chapter III court of the constitution could not exercise judicial power. This had a twofold effect in that it halted the creation of a number of non-judicial bodies which were to be empowered with such responsibilities, as well as pre-empting the creation of another Chapter III court to manage claims of this nature, which is today known as the Federal Circuit and Family Court of Australia. The decision did have drawbacks, as the problem of inefficiency and high costs, which prompted the creation of the amendment legislation for the RDA in the first place, is still apparent. However, it seems justified as reallocating the courts power to determine such disputes and vesting it in a tribunal raises questions of fairness.

The final point of constitutional significance arising from the case of Brandy is the formulation of four guidelines in the Deane, Dawson, Gaudron and McHugh JJ judgment which allow a court to determine whether or not judicial power is being exercised. The four points are:

1. The determination of a controversy between parties
2. Which is based upon existing facts and the application of law
3. Resulting in the awarding of remedies
4. Which constitute a binding and enforceable decision

These reiterate what are considered to be key characteristics (or indicia) of judicial power. However, these are not necessarily exhaustive, but are definitely a good indicator of judicial power being exercised.
