= Gustave Bouchereau =

French psychiatrist

Louis Gustave Bouchereau (20 June 1835 in Montrichard – 22 February 1900 in Paris) was a French psychiatrist.

He studied medicine in Paris, becoming a hospital externe in 1859, followed by an internship in 1863. In Paris he had as instructors Jean-Pierre Falret, Jules Baillarger, Jean-Martin Charcot and Alfred Vulpian. In 1866 he obtained his medical doctorate with a thesis on old hemiplegia, Des Hémiplégies anciennes. Soon afterwards, he was co-appointed with Valentin Magnan (1835–1916) to the Sainte-Anne asylum in Paris. In 1879 he succeeded Prosper Lucas (1805–1885) as superintendent of the women's division at Sainte-Anne.

Bouchereau served in a field hospital during the Franco-Prussian War. He was wounded at the Battle of Châtillon, subsequently being awarded with the badge of the Legion of Honour for gallantry and devotion. In 1871 he became a member of the Société Médico-Psychologique of Paris, being elected its president in 1891. For many years he served as general secretary of the Association mutuelle des médecins aliénistes de France.

== Publications ==
- Statistique des malades entrés en 1870 et en 1871 au bureau d'admission des aliénés de la Seine, with Valentin Magnan / Paris : Impr. de E. Donnaud, 1872.
