= Equal Treatment in Goods and Services Directive 2004 =

European flag

The Equal Treatment in Goods and Services Directive 2004 (2004/113/EC) of 13 December 2004 is a directive which prohibits both direct and indirect sexual discrimination in the provision of goods and services in the European Union.

== Amendment ==
As originally enacted Article 5(2) of the directive allowed member states to permit sexual discrimination in the provision of insurance services for renewal periods of five years. However, in Test-Achats ASBL v Conseil des ministres, the European Court of Justice invalidated this provision on the basis that it potentially permitted the indefinite continuance of discrimination in the provision of insurance contrary to Articles 21 and 23 of the Charter of Fundamental Rights.

== Preventing insurers from using gender as a risk factor ==
According to Article 5(1) of Directive 2004/113/EC, member states must ensure that "the use of sex as a factor in the calculation of premiums and benefits for the purposes of insurance and related financial services shall not result in differences in individuals' premiums and benefits".

However, initially insurers could use Article 5(2) as an opt-out clause, allowing them to decide whether or not to use gender as a determining factor when assessing risk, providing this decision was based on "relevant and accurate actuarial and statistical data".

Using the car insurance industry as an example, statistically speaking, men are generally involved in a higher number of serious traffic accidents and make more expensive claims than women. As a result, insurers were justified in using this exemption when calculating the price of an applicant's policy. Therefore, women traditionally received cheaper car insurance quotes than their male counterparts.

On 1 March 2011, the European Court of Justice (ECJ) issued its judgement in Test-Achats. The ECJ agreed with Test-Achats, a Belgian consumer group, and ruled Article 5(2) was invalid. Consequently, insurers were no longer able to use gender as a risk factor when pricing policies.

Following the ruling, insurers had until 21 December 2012 to comply with this decision and begin selling gender-neutral car insurance.

== Implications and criticisms ==
As of November 2012, no-one precisely knew how the ECJ's decision would impact the insurance industry. However, in the case of car insurance, many analysts expected the price of women's vehicle cover to substantially increase while men would see a slight reduction in the cost of their premiums. Although some believed the decision would lead to a fairer system, the Association of British Insurers opposed the decision.

Commenting on the matter in 2012, Director General Otto Thoresen stated, "Insurers and the UK Government fought for nearly a decade to retain the right to offer premiums and benefits priced as accurately as possible by considering risks linked to gender. But now that the battle is over, the industry is focused on preparing to give customers ‘gender-neutral’ rates that are as fair as possible." As of April 2015, UK journalists have suggested that the insurance gender imbalance still exists but it is now based on stated career or profession declared within the insurance application. Six professions were selected as examples of (a) male dominated professions, (b) female dominated professions and (c) gender-neutral professions. Clear results show the higher insurance premiums were quoted for male dominated professions.

== See also ==
- EU law
- List of European Union directives
