= Schmidberger =

Schmidberger is a surname. Notable persons with the surname include:

- Christoph Schmidberger (born 1974), Austrian-born American artist
- Franz Schmidberger (born 1946), German Archbishop
- Josef Schmidberger (1773–1844), Austrian priest and pomologist
- Thomas Schmidberger (born 1991), German para-table tennis player
