= Employment Equality (Age) Regulations 2006 =

United Kingdom statutory instrument

Employment Equality (Age) Regulations 2006 (Note: Section 1(1).)
- Statutory Instrument
- Parliament of the United Kingdom
- Citation: SI 2006/2408
- Territorial extent: England and Wales; Scotland; (Note: Section 1(3).)

Dates
- Made: 3 April 2006
- Commencement: 1 October 2006

Other legislation
- Amends: Marriage (Scotland) Act 1977; Solicitors (Scotland) Act 1980; Pilotage Act 1987; Social Security Contributions and Benefits Act 1992; Health Service Commissioners Act 1993; Employment Tribunals Act 1996; Equality Act 2006
- Made under: European Communities Act 1972
- Transposes: Equality Framework Directive (2000/78/EC)
- Amended by: Equality Act 2010

Status: Partially repealed

Text of statute as originally enacted

Text of the Employment Equality (Age) Regulations 2006 as in force today (including any amendments) within the United Kingdom, from legislation.gov.uk.

The Employment Equality (Age) Regulations 2006 (SI 2006/2408) is a piece of secondary legislation in the United Kingdom, which prohibits employers unreasonably discriminating against employees on grounds of age. It came into force on 1 October 2006. It is now superseded by the Equality Act 2010.

== Overview ==
The Regulations follow a very similar structure to existing legislation concerning sex, race, and religion. They provide a broad justification defence and a wide range of exceptions which have been criticised for undermining the concept of discrimination law by providing too many compromises on what would otherwise be unlawful.

== Default retirement age ==
Significant issues addressed by the legislation include the provision of a national default retirement age set at 65 (to be retained for at least five years) and the ability for employees to request work beyond the retirement age following procedure in schedule 6 of the regulations.

A legal challenge to the default retirement age ("DRA") brought by the charity Age UK failed in September 2009, with the judge finding that the regulations did not breach the European Union's Equal Treatment at Work Directive.

The Coalition government announced in July 2010 that it intends to eliminate the DRA from October 2011. Compulsory retirement at age 65 was fully abolished in 2011.

== See also ==
- Ageism
- Employment equality law in the United Kingdom
- Employment Equality Regulations
- UK labour law
- Pensions in the United Kingdom
- Age Discrimination in Employment Act and Age Discrimination Act of 1975 for the US
