= South Coast Baptist College =

Independent, Baptist day school in Western Australia

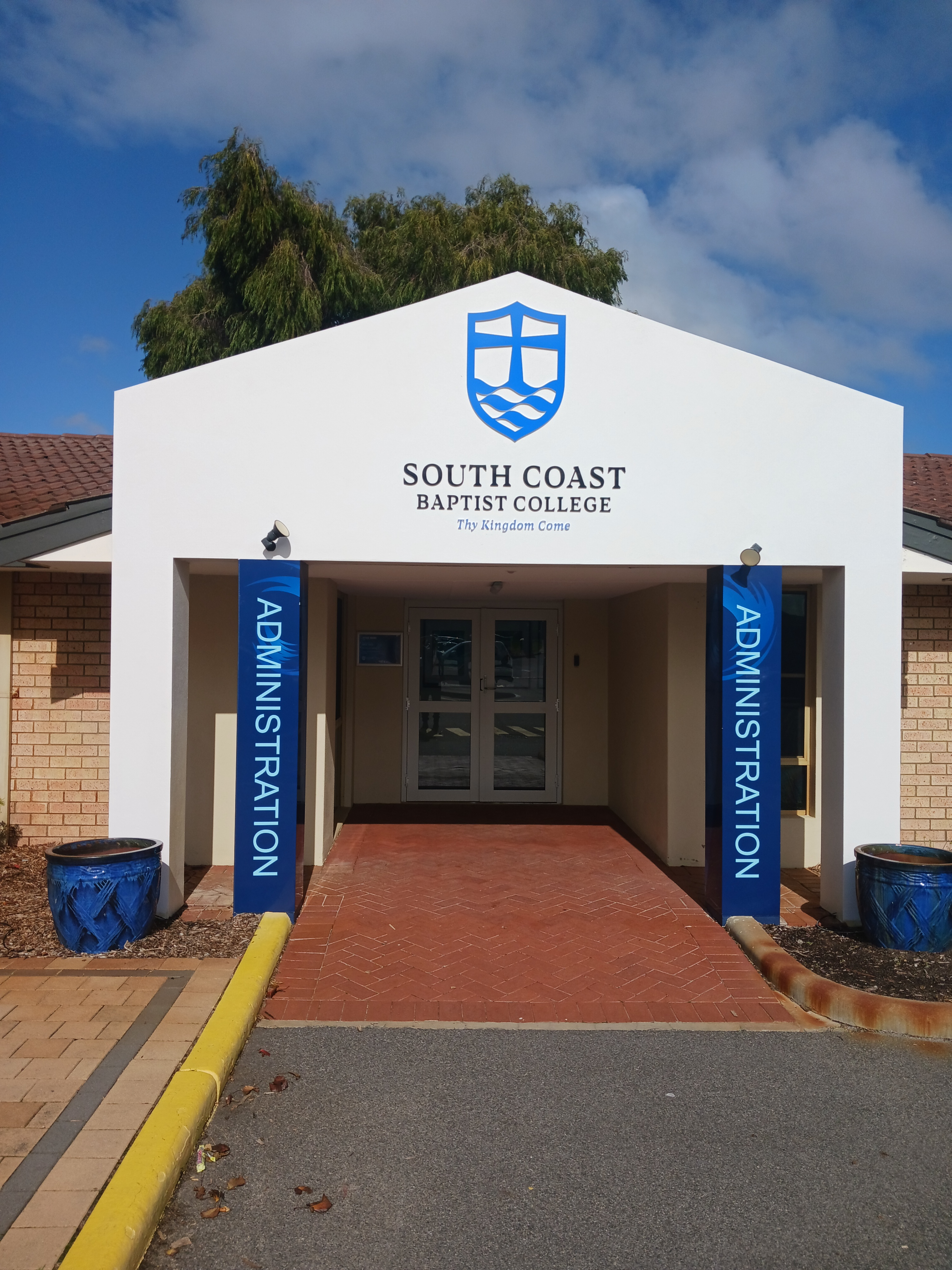
- Administration building entrance in 2023

Location
- 30 Gnangara Drive, Waikiki, Western Australia; Australia; 32°18′55″S 115°45′27″E

Information
- Type: Independent, Baptist, coeducational day school
- Denomination: Baptist
- Established: 1985; 41 years ago
- Educational authority: WA Department of Education
- Chairman: Grant Botha
- Principal: Dawn Clements
- Chaplain: Matthew Birch
- Grades: Kindergarten – Year 12
- Enrolment: 858 (2022)
- Website: www.scbc.wa.edu.au

The South Coast Baptist College, formerly the Maranatha Christian College, is an independent Baptist school providing a Kindergarten to Year 12 education in Waikiki, Western Australia.

== History ==
The school opened in 1985 in the suburb of Waikiki as Maranatha Christian College with the support of Rockingham Baptist Church. South Coast Baptist College (SCBC) is aligned with the Baptist denomination. The teachings of the scriptures of the Old and New Testaments form the doctrinal base. Families do not need to have a Christian faith to attend the College, but must be supportive and respectful of the school's Christian ethos.

In 2012, the College was rebranded to South Coast Baptist College. The College underwent a $45 million redevelopment project.

== Specialist programs ==
The College currently offers four specialist programs, namely the Football Academy, GATE (STEM skills), Vocal Academy, and Gymnastics.

== Controversies ==
The school received negative publicity in 2017 when it removed gay male relief teacher from the school’s relief teacher roster after he declared publicly to be in a same-sex-relationship. The principal at the time declared that he and the school respected the teacher's personal choice of relationship but that it violated the school's core religious beliefs. At the time, Western Australian law permitted dismissal of teachers at a faith-based church on religious grounds, but dismissal sparked a review of whether the law should be changed. As of 2022, the law permitting Campbell's dismissal was still under review, with the Western Australian Government in the process of drafting a new Equal Opportunity Act with the aim of strengthening protections for LGBTIQ+ people employed at religious schools.

On 13 November 2024 the principal, under the direction of the board, announced the closure of the elite Gymsports Academy due to the extremely high operating costs of the Program.

== Notable alumni ==
- Olivia Lewis – Netball player for West Coast Fever and the Melbourne Vixens
