= UN Declaration on the Elimination of All Forms of Intolerance and of Discrimination Based on Religion or Belief =

The UN Declaration on the Elimination of All Forms of Intolerance and of Discrimination Based on Religion or Belief is a United Nations resolution, passed with consensus on November 25 1981. The "freedom of thought, conscience, and religion" was first outlined in article 18 of the Universal Declaration on Human Rights. The resolution further elaborates human rights regarding the freedom of religion. The declaration on human rights outlines religious freedoms, and the Declaration on the Elimination of All Forms of Intolerance and Discrimination asserts the "right to freedom of thought, conscience, religion or whatever belief." The declaration was adopted by consensus 19 years after a request was made of the Economic and Social counsel to prepare a declaration addressing religious intolerance.

== Summary ==
Article 1: Everyone has the right to freedom of thought, conscience, and religion.

Article 2: Everyone has the right to freedom from discrimination. "Intolerance and discrimination based on religion or belief" means any distinction, exclusion, restriction or preference based on religion or belief."

Article 3: Discrimination on the basis of religion or belief is a disavowal of the Charter of the United Nations and a violation of the Universal Declaration of Human Rights.

Article 4: All States should take measures to combat religious intolerance in legislation and all aspects of life including civil, economic, political, social and cultural life.

Article 5: Every child shall be free from discrimination on the basis of religion or belief, and has the right to freedom of education per the wishes of their parents or legal guardian.

Article 6: The right to freedom of thought, conscience, religion or belief includes specific freedoms, beginning with the freedom to worship or assemble.

Article 7: The rights and freedoms in this declaration should be granted through national legislation so that all can benefit from these rights and freedoms."

Article 8: Nothing outlined in this declaration can be construed as restricting or detracting from any right defined in the Universal Declaration of Human Rights and the International Covenants on Human Rights.
