= Emanation of the state =

Emanation of the state is a term used in European law to describe any body which provides a public service under the control of government. The term was defined by the European Court of Justice (ECJ) in 1990, in the case of Foster, A and others v. British Gas plc. The ECJ's ruling defines the term as:

A body, whatever its legal form, which has been made responsible, pursuant to a measure adopted by the state, for providing a public service under the control of the state and has for that purpose special powers beyond that which result from the normal rules applicable in relations between individuals.

The term is most obviously used to describe public sector employers, such as the police, fire service, local government bodies or schools.

== Foster, A and others v. British Gas plc ==
This case was referred to the ECJ by the House of Lords in 1990. The issue to be decided was whether employees of a nationalised industry (in this case British Gas plc) could rely upon the Equal Treatment Directive when making claims in the English courts.

British Gas dismissed female employees when they reached 60, the compulsory retirement age for women at the time, but male employees were not required to retire until 65. At the time, the Sex Discrimination Act did not prevent discrimination in retirement age, so the employees' only recourse was to the Equal Treatment Directive.

The court found in favour of the employees. The gist of the finding was that when a state has failed to implement a directive as required, that state should not be allowed to benefit from the failure. Therefore, the provisions of the Equal Treatment Directive (and any other EU directive) can be relied upon against any organisation that is an emanation of the state.
