= Employment Equality Regulations =

Employment Equality Regulations may refer to:

- Employment Equality (Sexual Orientation) Regulations 2003
- Employment Equality (Religion or Belief) Regulations 2003
- Employment Equality (Age) Regulations 2006
