= Pubblico Ministero v Ratti =

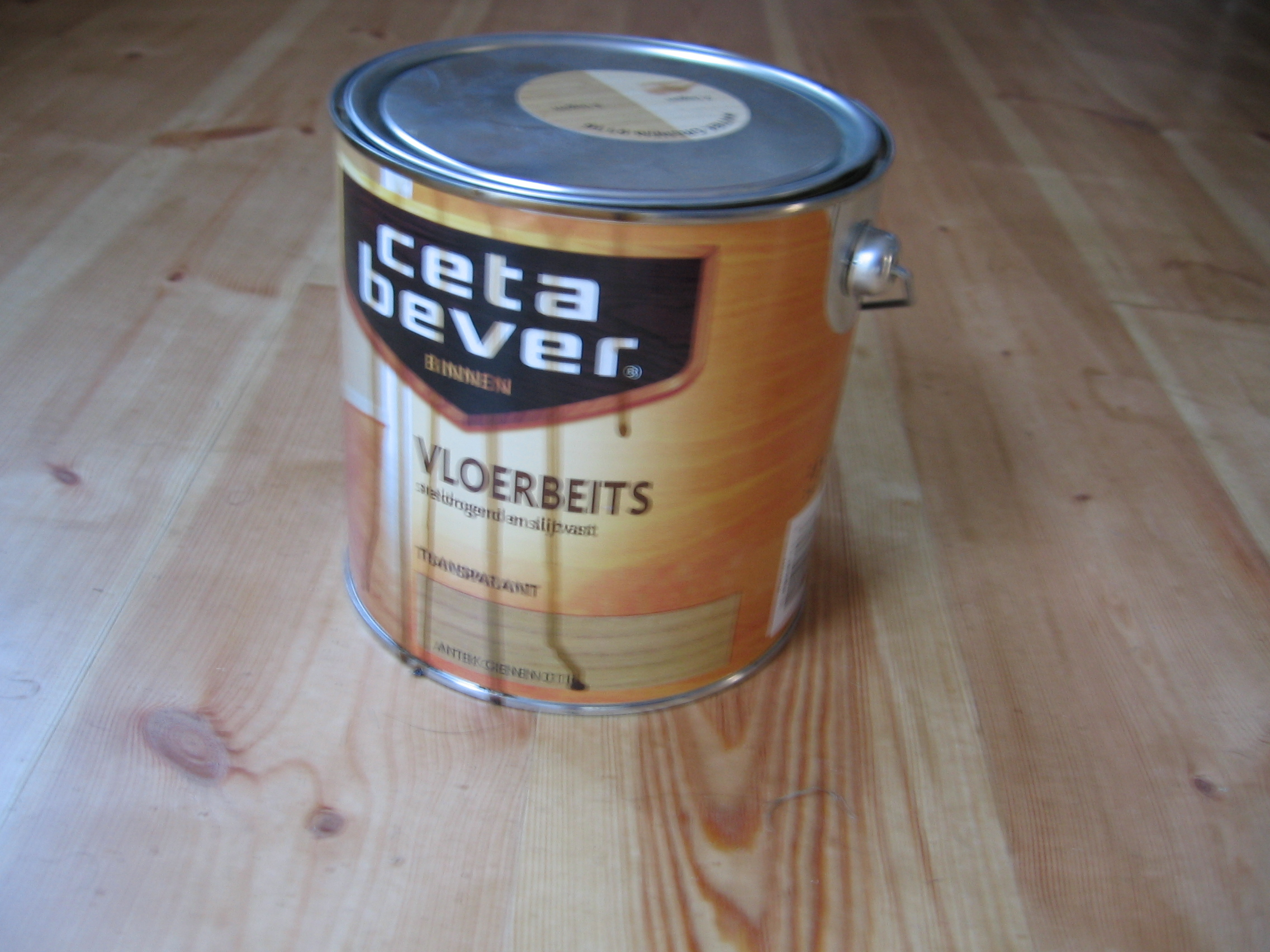
- Court: European Court of Justice
- Citations: (1979) Case 148/78, [1979] ECR 1629

Keywords
- Direct effect

Pubblico Ministero v Ratti (1979) Case 148/78 is an EU law case, concerning the conflict of law between a national legal system and European Union law.

== Facts ==
Mr Tullio Ratti claimed that he should not have to comply with a stricter Italian law that required him to label his solvents, on the ground that it conflicted with two Directives. Mr Ratti sold solvents and varnishes, some of which were imported from Germany that complied with two Directives. Directive 73/173 (adopted 4 June 1973, to be implemented 8 December 1974) and Directive 77/728 (adopted 7 November 1977, to be implemented 9 November 1979) required solvents and varnishes to be packaged and labelled specially. Mr Ratti complied with the Directives, but an Italian law of 1963 was stricter in some respects. Mr Ratti was prosecuted for failure to comply with the Italian law. Directive 73/173 was already meant to have been implemented, but Directive 77/728 was not yet required to be implemented: Italy had not changed the law at all. Mr Ratti argued that compliance with the Directives, rather than Italian law, was enough. The court in Milan referred to the ECJ whether Mr Ratti had to comply.

== Judgment ==
=== Advocate General Opinion ===
Advocate General Reischl gave an opinion, speaking against the possibility of horizontal direct effect.

=== Court of Justice ===
The ECJ held that Mr Ratti was not bound by Italian law that was meant to be changed by Directive 73/173, but he was still bound by Italian law, which would later have to be changed under Directive 77/728 because its deadline for being implemented had not yet passed.

22. Consequently a member state which has not adopted the implementing measures required by the Directive in the prescribed periods may not rely, as against individuals, on its own failure to perform the obligations which the Directive entails.

== See also ==
- European Union law
