= Foster v British Gas plc =

Foster v British Gas
- Court: European Court of Justice
- Citations: (1990) C-188/89, [1991] 2 AC 306, [1990] 3 All ER 897

Foster v British Gas plc (1990) C-188/89 is a leading EU law case concerning the definition of the "state", for the purpose of determining which organisations in the private or public sector can be regarded as an organ of the state. The ECJ held a state is any manifestation or organisation under control of a central government.

In a previous case, Chandler v Director of Public Prosecutions, Lord Reid held a state is synonymous with an 'organised community', and according to Lord Devlin it meant 'the organs of government of a national community'.

== Facts ==
Mrs Foster was required to retire from her job at British Gas when she was 60 years old, while men could continue until they were 65. British Gas was a nationalised industry at the time (before being privatised under the Gas Act 1986), and she and four other women claimed this was unlawful discrimination on grounds of sex, contrary to the Equal Treatment Directive (then 76/207/EEC, and now recast in 2006/54/EC). Because directives in principle only bind the member state, to which they are addressed, in order to make a direct claim against her employer, Mrs Foster needed to show that British Gas was part of the state. She argued it was because the board members of British Gas were appointed by a minister in the UK government (a secretary of state), which could also issue to the board various directions and instruments. Additionally, the board was required to submit periodic reports to the secretary of state.

== Judgment ==
=== Court of Justice ===
The European Court of Justice held that the decision on any given set of facts for what constituted part of the state was to be left to the courts of the member state in principle. The general requirements would be that the organisation had to be subject to the authority or control of the state, whatever its legal form, and whether in public or private hands.

18. ... unconditional and sufficiently precise provisions of a Directive could be relied on against organizations or bodies which were subject to the authority or control of the State or had special powers beyond those which result from the normal rules applicable to relations between individuals.

19. The court has accordingly held that provisions of a Directive could be relied on against tax authorities... local of regional authorities... constitutionally independent authorities responsible for the maintenance of public order and safety... and public authorities providing public health services...

20. It follows...that a body, whatever its legal form, which has been made responsible, pursuant to a measure adopted by the state, for providing a public service under the control of the state and has for that purpose special powers beyond those which result from the normal rules applicable in relation between individuals, is included... among the bodies against which the provisions of a directive capable of having direct effect may be relied upon.

=== House of Lords ===
The women appealed to the House of Lords. In the meantime, the European Court of Justice held that Art.5(1) could be relied on against anyone made responsible for the provision of a public service. Held, allowing the appeal, that the corporation was a body against which Art.5(1) could be enforced; the matter would be remitted for assessment of compensation (Foster v British Gas Plc (C-188/89) [1991] 1 Q.B. 405 approved).

== See also ==
- EU law
- EU labour law
