= Anti-Discrimination Act 1991 =

Australian state law

Parliament of Queensland
- Long title: An Act to promote equality of opportunity for everyone by protecting them from unfair discrimination in certain areas of activity and from sexual harassment and certain associated objectionable conduct.
- Passed: 3 December 1991
- Royal assent: 9 December 1991
- Commenced: 30 June 1992
- Introduced by: Hon. D. M. Wells (Murrumba – Attorney-General)
- Status: Current legislation

The Queensland Anti-Discrimination Act 1991 is an act of the Parliament of Queensland that provides protection against unfair discrimination, sexual harassment, and other objectionable conduct. The act was passed by the Queensland Parliament on 3 December 1991, received assent on 9 December 1991, and commenced on 30 June 1992.

== Scope of the act ==
The Anti-Discrimination Act 1991 prohibits discrimination on the basis of the following attributes:

- Sex
- Relationship status
- Pregnancy
- Parental status
- Breastfeeding
- Age
- Race
- Impairment
- Religious belief or religious activity
- Political belief or activity
- Trade union activity
- Lawful sexual activity
- Gender identity
- Sexuality
- Family responsibilities
- Association with, or relation to, a person identified on the basis of any of the above attributes.

== Areas ==
The areas of activity where discrimination is unlawful are:

- Work and work related (includes applying for work, voluntary work, employment, work under a contract, partnerships, employment agencies, work experience and work under a training program)
- Education
- Supplying goods or services
- Accommodation (includes residential and commercial premises)
- Administration of State laws or programs (includes State government departments and statutory authorities performing functions under an Act)
- Club membership and affairs (does not include not-for-profit associations and clubs)
- Superannuation
- Insurance
- Disposing of land (for example, selling, leasing)
- Local government members (between local government members performing official functions, except on the basis of political belief or activity).

== Anti-Discrimination Commission Queensland ==
The implementation of the Act saw the establishment of the Anti-Discrimination Commission Queensland, an independent statutory body to resolve complaints of discrimination, sexual harassment, vilification, victimisation and other contraventions of the Anti-Discrimination Act, as well as to promote an understanding, acceptance, and public discussion of human rights in Queensland.

== Legacy ==
In 2016, the Anti-Discrimination Commission Queensland and State Library of Queensland marked the 25th anniversary of the establishment of the Act, by creating seven short videos exploring the impact of the Act on Queenslanders and feature interviews with activists, politicians, community advocates and social justice professionals.

On 1 July 2019, with the commencement of the Human Rights Act 2019 (Qld) the Commission was renamed as the Queensland Human Rights Commission.

== See also ==
- List of anti-discrimination acts
