= Age Discrimination Act 2004 =

Law in Australia

Parliament of Australia
- Long title: An Act relating to discrimination on the ground of age
- Citation: Age Discrimination Act 2004 (Cth)
- Enacted by: House of Representatives
- Enacted by: Senate
- Royal assent: 22 June 2004
- Commenced: 23 June 2004

Legislative history

Initiating chamber: House of Representatives
- Bill title: Age Discrimination Bill 2003
- Introduced by: Daryl Williams
- First reading: 26 June 2003
- Second reading: 26 November 2003
- Third reading: 26 November 2003

Revising chamber: Senate
- Bill title: Age Discrimination Bill 2003
- First reading: 1 December 2003
- Second reading: 3 December 2003
- Third reading: 29 March 2004

Amended by
- Age Discrimination Amendment Act 2006 (Cth)

Related legislation
- Age Discrimination (Consequential Provisions) Act 2004 (Cth)
- Status: In force

The Age Discrimination Act 2004 is an act of the Parliament of Australia that prohibits age discrimination in many areas including employment, education, accommodation and the provision of goods and services. Persons of any age can be discriminated against within the meaning of the act.

Some exemptions are provided, including for religious organisations, charitable organisations and positive discrimination. A person's age may be take into account in the terms and conditions of life insurance, annuities, retirement benefits, and other similar offerings if the discrimination is reasonable and based on actuarial or statistical data.

Complaints of discrimination must first be made to the Australian Human Rights Commission (AHRC), where a conciliation process can be initiated. Filing a complaint is free. If the complaint is not resolved through the conciliation process, it can be taken to the Federal Court or the Federal Circuit Court.

In general, age discrimination is not a criminal offence. However, the act creates criminal offences of discriminatory advertising, victimisation and failure to disclose statistical or actuarial data upon request by the president of the AHRC.

== See also ==
- Keech v Metropolitan Health Service
- List of anti-discrimination acts
