= Human Immunodeficiency Virus and Acquired Immune Deficiency Syndrome (Prevention and Control) Act, 2017 =

Act of the Indian Parliament

Parliament of India
- Long title: An Act to provide for the prevention and control of the spread of Human Immunodeficiency Virus and Acquired Immune Deficiency Syndrome and for the protection of human rights of persons affected by the said virus and syndrome and for matters connected therewith or incidental thereto.
- Citation: Act No. 16 of 2017
- Territorial extent: India
- Passed by: Rajya Sabha
- Passed: 21 March 2017
- Passed by: Lok Sabha
- Passed: 11 April 2017
- Assented to: 20 April 2017
- Effective: 10 September 2018

Legislative history

Initiating chamber: Rajya Sabha
- Bill title: The Human Immunodeficiency Virus and Acquired Immune Deficiency Syndrome (Prevention and Control) Bill, 2014
- Bill citation: Bill No. III of 2014
- Introduced: 11 February 2014
- Committee report: Standing Committee on Ministry of Health and Family Welfare 85th Report (29 April 2015)
- Status: In force

The Human Immunodeficiency Virus and Acquired Immune Deficiency Syndrome (Prevention and Control) Act, 2017, often shortened to the HIV/AIDS Prevention Act, is an act of the Parliament of India that provides for controlling and preventing of HIV/AIDS and securing the rights of individuals diagnosed with HIV/AIDS. The bill for the act was introduced in the Rajya Sabha on 11 February 2014 and was referred to a Standing Committee on 24 February 2014, which submitted its report on 29 April 2015. After few amendments to the original 2014 bill, it was passed by the Rajya Sabha on 21 March 2017 and the Lok Sabha on 11 April 2017. It received Presidential assent on 20 April 2017, and became effective from 10 September 2018. The HIV/AIDS Prevention Act originated from a draft bill submitted by Lawyers Collective, a non-governmental organization, to the National AIDS Control Organisation (NACO) in 2006. The act penalises propagation of hate against HIV/AIDS affected persons, ensures the right of HIV/AIDS affected minors to shared household, protects non-disclosure of HIV/AIDS status in the absence of court order and mandates informed consent to disclose HIV/AIDS positive identity, inter alia. However, civil society organisations and HIV/AIDS affected persons criticised the act on certain legal language issues, as it mandates the state to provide HIV/AIDS affected persons with medical services "as far as possible". This aspect was absent from the draft bill submitted to NACO.

Post enactment, India reportedly came to become the first country in south Asia to statutorily prohibit discrimination against people diagnosed with HIV/AIDS. The act became effective post the Supreme Court judgment in Navtej Singh Johar and ors. v. Union of India decriminalising homosexuality in India. In 2018, the Joint United Nations Agency on AIDS reported that new HIV infections dropped from 1,20,000 in 2010 to 88,000 in 2017 in India, AIDS-related deaths from 1,60,000 to 69,000 and people living with HIV from 2,300,000 to 2,100,000 in the same time period. However, the decline rate was only 27 per-cent compared to NACO's target of 75 per-cent reduction by 2020 from 2010 levels. In 2017, NACO reported that there are 2.14 million HIV affected persons in India.

== Background and history ==
In July 2000, the United Nations Security Council adopted Resolution 1308 calling for “urgent and exceptional actions” to mitigate threats posed by HIV/AIDS infection. The process of drafting a law to prevent and control the spread of HIV/AIDS in India, while securing the rights of HIV/AIDS affected persons, commenced in 2002, following which a draft bill created by Lawyers Collective, a non-governmental organisation, was submitted to the National AIDS Control Organisation in 2006. From the year 2010, an integration of HIV/AIDS interventions and primary health-care systems started with six components of the National AIDS Control Programme (NACP)-III merged with the National Rural Health Mission (NRHM). These included Integrated Counselling and Testing Centresers (ICTC); prevention of parent-to-child transmission; blood safety; sexually transmitted infections services; condom programming; and antiretroviral treatment (ART); the integration of HIV/AIDS interventions under the broader healthcare system continued with the NACP-IV.

An independent expert committee report by United Nations in 2012 noted that regressive laws were hindrances to developments in the field of HIV/AIDS, while a Global Commission Report noted that the lack of HIV/AIDS affected persons' access to healthcare facilities helped further spread the disease. A United Nations report also noted that India had the third largest number of people living with HIV/AIDS in the world at the end of 2013, standing at 2.1 million affected people, accounting for about 4 out of every 10 people living with HIV/AIDS.

The HIV/AIDS Prevention Bill (No. III), 2014 was introduced in the Rajya Sabha on 17 February 2014 by the then Minister of Health and Family Welfare, Ghulam Nabi Azad. The primary objectives of the bill, inter alia, were to prevent and control the spread of HIV/AIDS, prohibit discrimination against people diagnosed with HIV/AIDS, and provide such persons with effective treatment. The bill was referred to the Standing Committee on Ministry of Health and Family Welfare on 26 February 2014, and the committee submitted its report on 29 April 2015. The bill received push in July 2016 when the government made certain changes to the bill in response to concerns raised by the HIV/AIDS affected community and state governments. It was passed by the Lok Sabha on 11 April 2017 and the Rajya Sabha on 21 March 2017. The then Minister for Health and Family Welfare, Jagat Prakash Nadda reiterated the government's commitment to provide medical treatment to HIV/AIDS affected persons. The bill received assent from then President Pranab Mukherjee on 20 April 2017, and was notified in the Gazette of India on 10 September 2018, thereby coming into effect.

Earlier in 2016 at the United Nations, India had pledged to follow targets and achieve its sustainable goal of development by fast tracking progress aimed towards ending the HIV/AIDS epidemic by 2030. It increased funding of HIV/AIDS programmes with two-thirds of the budget for the NACP-IV being provided by the government from its domestic budget.

Further, on 6 September 2018, the Supreme Court delivered its judgment in Navtej Singh Johar and ors. v. Union of India decriminalising homosexuality in India, by reading down Section 377 of the Indian Penal Code. It also overruled the 2013 judgment in Suresh Kumar Koushal v. Naz Foundation and upheld the 2009 Delhi High Court judgment Naz Foundation v. Govt. of NCT of Delhi.

== Statutory provisions ==
The act prohibits discrimination against persons living with HIV/AIDS for the purposes of employment, provides for access to educational establishments of such persons, along with access to healthcare and insurance services, renting property, or running for public or private office. The law also prohibits any form of expression that is deemed as inciting hatred against people infected with HIV/AIDS. As per the act's provisions, conducting an HIV test, medical treatment, or research on a person without their informed consent is unlawful, and it prohibits a person from being forced to disclose their HIV/AIDS status, unless mandated by a court order. The act also protects the rights of HIV/AIDS affected minors to shared household. However, no informed consent is to be required by licensed blood banks, medical research, and epidemiological purposes where an HIV test is conducted anonymously and not specifically for the purpose of identifying a HIV positive individual. The act penalises propagation of hate against HIV/AIDS affected persons with fine and imprisonment for term of three months up to two years, while making anti-retroviral treatment (ART) a right for all HIV/AIDS affected persons. It also mandates for the central and state governments to provide HIV prevention, testing, treatment, and counselling services to affected individuals.

== Response and criticism ==
The act was criticised by the civil society and HIV/affected persons on certain legal language issues concerning provision of services by state to HIV/AIDS affected persons. The provisions mandate the state to provide HIV/AIDS affected persons with medical services "as far as possible" without taking into account the overall lack of HIV/AIDS medicines in the domestic market and the budget cuts of NACO, giving the state an escape-route from liability. This aspect of the act was absent from the draft bill submitted by Lawyers Collective to NACO. India reportedly came to become the first country in south Asia to statutorily prohibit discrimination against people diagnosed with HIV/AIDS. Steve Kraus of the U.N. AIDS Regional Support Team for Asia and the Pacific hailed the act for it will "remove barriers and empower people to challenge violations of their human rights". While Huidrom Rosenara of the India HIV/AIDS Alliance noted instances of discrimination in various fields against HIV/AIDS affected persons and stated the act to be a "long awaited and positive move".

In 2017, UNAIDS reported the adult HIV prevalence in India to be 0.28 per-cent. The number of HIV affected persons in India declined from 5.1 million in 2003 to 2.1 million in 2016, partly owing to World Health Organization's revised methodology to calculate the decline which had brought down HIV estimates for India to 2.5 million in 2007. In 2018, the Joint United Nations Agency on AIDS reported that new HIV infections dropped from 1,20,000 in 2010 to 88,000 in 2017 in India, AIDS-related deaths from 1,60,000 to 69,000 and people living with HIV from 2,300,000 to 2,100,000 in the same time period. The decline percentage for new HIV infections was 27 per-cent between 2010 and 2017, while NACO's target is to achieve a 75 per-cent reduction by 2020 from 2010 levels. The decline rate in infections was the most among transgender persons, HIV prevalence drop being 29.6 per-cent in 2006 to 3.14 per-cent in 2017, followed by the decline rate in infections amongst homosexual men — there are no separate estimates for transgender persons prior to 2006. NACO reported in 2017 that India has around 2.14 million HIV affected persons, accounting for 0.22 per-cent of the 15–49 years age group in the country.
