= Australian Human Rights Commission =

Human rights institution of the Australian Government

Commission overview
- Formed: 1981 (Human Rights Commission); 1986 (HREOC)
- Preceding commission: Human Rights and Equal Opportunity Commission
- Jurisdiction: Australia
- Headquarters: Sydney
- Employees: 126
- Minister responsible: Michelle Rowland, Attorney-General of Australia
- Commission executives: Hugh de Kretser, President; Katie Kiss, Aboriginal and Torres Strait Islander Social Justice Commissioner; Rosemary Kayess, Disability Discrimination Commissioner; Lorraine Finlay, Human Rights Commissioner; Giridharan Sivaraman, Race Discrimination Commissioner; Anna Cody, Sex Discrimination Commissioner; Robert Fitzgerald, Age Discrimination Commissioner
- Key documents: Racial Discrimination Act 1975; Sex Discrimination Act 1984; Disability Discrimination Act 1992; Age Discrimination Act 2004; Australian Human Rights Commission Act 1986
- Website: humanrights.gov.au

The Australian Human Rights Commission (AHRC) is the national human rights institution of the Commonwealth of Australia. It is a statutory body funded by, but operating independently of, the Australian Government. It is responsible for investigating alleged infringements of Australia's anti-discrimination legislation in relation to federal agencies.

The AHRC was established in 1986 as the Human Rights and Equal Opportunity Commission (HREOC), which replaced an earlier Human Rights Commission (HRC) established in 1981. The primary governing legislation for the commission is the Australian Human Rights Commission Act 1986, but the commission also has powers under the Racial Discrimination Act 1975, the Sex Discrimination Act 1984, the Disability Discrimination Act 1992, and the Age Discrimination Act 2004. Matters that can be investigated by the commission under the Australian Human Rights Commission Regulations 2019 include discrimination on the grounds of age, medical record, an irrelevant criminal record; disability; marital or relationship status; nationality; sexual orientation; or trade union activity.

== History ==
The original Human Rights Commission (HRC) was established by the Fraser government pursuant to the Human Rights Commission Act 1981, with Roma Mitchell as the inaugural chairman. The commission's creation followed Australian ratification of the International Covenant on Civil and Political Rights in 1980. The Fraser government had previously introduced bills to create a human rights body in 1977 and 1979, both of which failed to progress, and the Whitlam government had introduced a bill to create a Human Rights Commissioner in 1973.

The HRC was granted the power to investigate alleged breaches of human rights by the federal government, including violations of the Racial Discrimination Act 1975, but was not authorised to review the actions of states. It replaced the Human Rights Bureau within the Attorney-General's Department, which had been established by Peter Durack in 1980, and also absorbed the office of the Commissioner for Community Relations which had been established by the Whitlam government.

The Human Rights Commission Act 1981 included a sunset clause whereby the HRC would lapse after five years. In 1983, the Hawke government proposed legislation that would have created a bill of rights and allowed the HRC to investigate state government actions. Revised legislation was introduced in 1985 separating the proposed bill of rights from the legislation relating to the commission. The Human Rights and Equal Opportunity Commission Act 1986 established a new Human Rights and Equal Opportunity Commission (HREOC) to replace the HRC, which was symbolically proclaimed on International Human Rights Day.

The HREOC was given expanded powers of investigation and resolution of complaints via conciliation, including those made under the Sex Discrimination Act 1984. In 1992, the Keating government amended the Racial Discrimination Act to allow determinations of the HREOC to be registered by the Federal Court of Australia and given judicial force. In 1995, the High Court of Australia ruled in Brandy v Human Rights and Equal Opportunity Commission that the amendments were unconstitutional as they conferred judicial power upon an administrative body and violated the separation of powers. This forced a reversion of the commission's role to one of conciliation.

The HREOC was renamed the Australian Human Rights Commission (AHRC) in 2008.

== Commission officebearers ==
The Commission falls under the portfolio of the Attorney-General of Australia.

=== Commission presidents ===
The following individuals have been appointed as president or chairman of the AHRC and its predecessors:

Order	Official	Official title	Term
1	Roma Mitchell	Chairman, Human Rights Commission	1982–1986
2	Marcus Einfeld	President, Human Rights and Equal Opportunity Commission	1986–1990
3	Sir Ronald Wilson	President, Human Rights and Equal Opportunity Commission	1990–1998
4	Alice Tay	President, Human Rights and Equal Opportunity Commission	1998–2003
5	John von Doussa	President, Human Rights and Equal Opportunity Commission	2003–2008
6	Catherine Branson	President, Australian Human Rights Commission	2008–2012
7	Gillian Triggs	President, Australian Human Rights Commission	2012–2017
8	Ros Croucher	President, Australian Human Rights Commission	2017–2024
9	Hugh de Kretser	President, Australian Human Rights Commission	2024–present

=== Aboriginal and Torres Strait Islander Social Justice Commissioners ===
The following individuals have been appointed as an Aboriginal and Torres Strait Islander Social Justice Commissioner:

Order	Official	Official title	Term
1	Mick Dodson	Aboriginal and Torres Strait Islander Social Justice Commissioner	1993–1998
2	Zita Antonios	Aboriginal and Torres Strait Islander Social Justice Commissioner	1998–1999 (acting)
3	Bill Jonas	Aboriginal and Torres Strait Islander Social Justice Commissioner	1999–2004
4	Tom Calma	Aboriginal and Torres Strait Islander Social Justice Commissioner	2004–2010
5	Mick Gooda	Aboriginal and Torres Strait Islander Social Justice Commissioner	2010–2016
6	June Oscar	Aboriginal and Torres Strait Islander Social Justice Commissioner	2017–2024
7	Katie Kiss	Aboriginal and Torres Strait Islander Social Justice Commissioner	2024–present

=== Disability Discrimination Commissioners ===
The following individuals have been appointed as a Disability Discrimination Commissioners:

Order	Official	Official title	Term
1	Elizabeth Hastings	Disability Discrimination Commissioner	1993–1997
2	Chris Sidoti	Disability Discrimination Commissioner	1998 (acting)
3	Susan Halliday	Disability Discrimination Commissioner	1999 (acting)
4	Sev Ozdowski	Disability Discrimination Commissioner	2000–2005 (acting)
5	Graeme Innes	Disability Discrimination Commissioner	2005–2014
6	Susan Ryan	Disability Discrimination Commissioner	2014–2016 (acting)
7	Alastair McEwin	Disability Discrimination Commissioner	2016–2019
8	Ben Gauntlett	Disability Discrimination Commissioner	2019–2023
9	Rosemary Kayess	Disability Discrimination Commissioner	2024–present

=== Human Rights Commissioners ===
The following individuals have been appointed as a Human Rights Commissioner:

Order	Official	Official title	Term
1	Brian Burdekin	Human Rights Commissioner	1986–1994
2	Chris Sidoti	Human Rights Commissioner	1995–2000
3	Sev Ozdowski	Human Rights Commissioner	2000–2005
4	Graeme Innes	Human Rights Commissioner	2005–2009
5	Catherine Branson	Human Rights Commissioner	2009–2012
6	Tim Wilson	Human Rights Commissioner	2013–2016
7	Edward Santow	Human Rights Commissioner	2016–2021
8	Lorraine Finlay	Human Rights Commissioner	2021–present

=== Race Discrimination Commissioners ===
The following individuals have been appointed as a Race Discrimination Commissioner:

Order	Official	Official title	Term
1	Irene Moss	Race Discrimination Commissioner	1986–1994
2	Zita Antonios	Race Discrimination Commissioner	1994–1999
3	Bill Jonas	Race Discrimination Commissioner	1999–2004
4	Tom Calma	Race Discrimination Commissioner	2004–2009
5	Graeme Innes	Race Discrimination Commissioner	2009–2011
6	Helen Szoke	Race Discrimination Commissioner	2011–2013
7	Gillian Triggs	Race Discrimination Commissioner	2013 (acting)
8	Tim Soutphommasane	Race Discrimination Commissioner	2013–2018
9	Chin Tan	Race Discrimination Commissioner	2018–2023
10	Giridharan Sivaraman	Race Discrimination Commissioner	2024–present

=== Sex Discrimination Commissioners ===
The following individuals have been appointed as a Sex Discrimination Commissioner:

Order	Official	Official title	Term
1	Pam O'Neil	Sex Discrimination Commissioner	1984–1988
2	Quentin Bryce	Sex Discrimination Commissioner	1988–1993
3	Susan Walpole	Sex Discrimination Commissioner	1993–1997
4	Moira Scollay	Sex Discrimination Commissioner	1997–1998 (acting)
5	Susan Halliday	Sex Discrimination Commissioner	1998–2001
6	Pru Goward	Sex Discrimination Commissioner	2001–2007
7	John von Doussa	Sex Discrimination Commissioner	2007 (acting)
8	Elizabeth Broderick	Sex Discrimination Commissioner	2007–2015
9	Kate Jenkins	Sex Discrimination Commissioner	2016–2023
10	Ros Croucher	Sex Discrimination Commissioner	2023 (acting)
11	Anna Cody	Sex Discrimination Commissioner	2023–present

=== Age Discrimination Commissioner ===
The following individuals have been appointed as an Age Discrimination Commissioner, or precedent titles:

Order	Official	Official title	Term
1	Pru Goward	Commissioner Responsible for Age Discrimination	2005–2007
2	John von Doussa	Commissioner Responsible for Age Discrimination	2007 (acting)
3	Elizabeth Broderick	Commissioner Responsible for Age Discrimination	2007–2011
4	Susan Ryan	Age Discrimination Commissioner	2011–2016
5	Kay Patterson	Age Discrimination Commissioner	2016–2023
6	Robert Fitzgerald	Age Discrimination Commissioner	2024–present

=== National Children's Commissioner ===
The following individuals have been appointed as a National Children's Commissioner:

Order	Official	Official title	Term
1	Megan Mitchell	National Children's Commissioner	2013–2020
2	Anne Hollonds	National Children's Commissioner	2020–2025
3	Deb Tsorbaris	2025–present	

=== Privacy Commissioner ===
The following have served as Privacy Commissioner, initially at HREOC and then at two other Offices:

Order	Official	Official title	Term
1	Kevin O’Connor, AM	Privacy Commissioner (at HREOC)	1989–1996
2	Moira Scollay	Privacy Commissioner (at HREOC)	1997–1999
3	Malcolm Crompton	Privacy Commissioner (at HREOC until July 2000, then at OPC)	1999–2004
4	Karen Curtis	Privacy Commissioner (at OPC)	2004–2010
5	Timothy Pilgrim PSM	Privacy Commissioner (at OAIC); Acting Australian Information Commissioner (from 2015)	2010–2018
6	Angelene Falk	Privacy Commissioner (at OAIC); Australian Information Commissioner	2018–2024
7	Carly Kind	Privacy Commissioner (at OAIC)	2024–present

On 1 January 1989 the Privacy Act 1988 established the Privacy Commissioner within the commission. The Privacy Commissioner continued in the commission until 1 July 2000, when a new Office of the Privacy Commissioner was established by the federal Parliament, and the Privacy Commissioner was separated from the commission.

In 2010, the Office of the Australian Information Commissioner (OAIC) was established and the previously independent Office of the Privacy Commissioner was subsumed into it. The Privacy Commissioner now came under the supervision of the new Australian Information Commissioner, who could exercise the Privacy Commissioner's powers.

From 2014, the incoming Australian government under PM Tony Abbott attempted to abolish the OAIC, succeeding in having the Australian Information Commissioner (John McMillan) unexpectedly retire early and FOI Commissioner (James Popple) resign, and cutting OAIC's budget. But the Senate failed to pass the necessary legislation (Freedom of Information Amendment (New Arrangements) Bill 2014). Several former judges suggested this pursuit of the abolition of a body created by Parliament without its support for that abolition raises constitutional and rule of law concerns. Then-Privacy Commissioner Pilgrim was appointed Acting Australian Information Commissioner in July 2015 for three months, filling all three OAIC roles on a part-time basis (and now also administering the Freedom of Information Act 1982 (Cth) and the Australian Information Commissioner Act 2010 (Cth)). He was reappointed as Acting Australian Information Commissioner in October 2015 for three months, and again on 19 January 2016 until 19 April 2016.

In early 2016, it remained unclear whether the Privacy Commissioner role would be returned to the Commission if the abolition of the OAIC were to succeed.

On 18 March 2016, the Commonwealth Attorney-General advertised for expressions of interest in the positions, to commence in July, of Age Discrimination Commissioner, Disability Discrimination Commissioner and Human Rights Commissioner; these positions were filled accordingly.

== Legislation ==
From its introduction until 2000, the Commission hosted the Commissioner administering the Privacy Act 1988 (Cth).

The Commission investigates alleged infringements under the following federal legislation:

- Racial Discrimination Act 1975 (Cth)
- Sex Discrimination Act 1984 (Cth)
- Disability Discrimination Act 1992 (Cth)
- Age Discrimination Act 2004 (Cth)
- Australian Human Rights Commission Act 1986 (Cth) (formerly Human Rights and Equal Opportunity Commission Act 1986)

The Australian Human Rights Commission Act 1986 articulates the Australian Human Rights Commission's role and responsibilities. It gives effect to Australia's obligations under the following:

- International Covenant on Civil and Political Rights (ICCPR);
- Convention Concerning Discrimination in Respect of Employment and Occupation (ILO 111);
- Convention on the Rights of Persons with Disabilities;
- Convention on the Rights of the Child;
- Declaration of the Rights of the Child;
- Declaration on the Rights of Disabled Persons;
- Declaration on the Rights of Mentally Retarded Persons; and
- Declaration on the Elimination of All Forms of Intolerance and of Discrimination Based on Religion or Belief.

Matters that can be investigated by the Commission under the Australian Human Rights Commission Regulations 2019 include discrimination on the grounds of age, medical record, an irrelevant criminal record, disability, marital or relationship status, nationality, sexual orientation, or trade union activity.

== Public inquiries ==
One of the more visible functions of the commission is to conduct public inquiries. Some examples of inquiries conducted include:

- Homeless Children Inquiry (1989)
- National Inquiry into Racist Violence in Australia (1989-1991)
- Inquiry into the Accessibility of electronic commerce and new service and information technologies for older Australians and people with a disability (2000)
- Pregnancy Discrimination Inquiry (2000)
- Same-Sex: Same Entitlements Inquiry into financial and workplace discrimination against same-sex couples
- Separation of Aboriginal and Torres Strait Islander Children from their Families (Bringing Them Home Report (1997))
- National Inquiry into Children in Immigration Detention (2004) The report, A Last Resort? was published in April 2004.
- National Inquiry into Children in Immigration Detention (2014) The Forgotten Children report was submitted by Gillian Triggs in November 2014.
- Pregnancy and Return to Work National Review (2014)

== Reviews ==
On 30 July 2020, the Australian Human Rights Commission announced that they would conduct a review of the country's gymnastics program, following complaints of physical and mental abuse from some of the former athletes. Former Australian gymnasts had reported being assaulted by coaches, fat-shamed and made to train and compete while injured.

== Gender identity and sexuality ==
Private members' bills introduced from both the Australian Greens and the Australian Democrats tried to add sexuality and/or gender identity to the list of matters that can be investigated by the commission, which always failed to pass at least one house of parliament between 1995 and June 2007, because of a lack of support from both the Australian Labor Party and the Coalition in the federal parliament.

Relevant legislation was later passed in Acts such as the Sex Discrimination Amendment (Sexual Orientation, Gender Identity and Intersex Status) Act 2013.

== Human Rights Awards and Medals ==
Since 1987, the Human Rights Awards have been presented at the commission's annual Human Rights Medal and Awards ceremony.

== International status ==
The Commission is one of some 70 national human rights institutions (NHRIs) accredited by the Global Alliance of National Human Rights Institutions (GANHRI), a body sponsored by the Office of the United Nations High Commissioner for Human Rights (OHCHR). The Commission's full ("A status") accreditation has allowed it special access to the United Nations human rights system, including speaking rights at the Human Rights Council and other committees. The Commission has been able to present parallel reports ("shadow reports") to UN treaty committees examining Australia's compliance with international human rights instruments. It has been very active in developing NHRIs throughout the Asia-Pacific region, and is a leading member of the Asia Pacific Forum of NHRIs, one of four regional sub-groups of NHRIs.

In April 2022, GANHRI informed the Commission that it would lose its "A status" and that its status would be reviewed after approximately 18 months. GANHRI found that recent government decisions to appoint Commissioners had not been made with appropriate transparency. It was also concerned about inadequate funding because of increased workloads and additional commissioners. The appointment process and the funding gap were later addressed and AHRC retained its "A status" in November 2023.

== See also ==
- Human Rights Commission
