= Equal Treatment Directive 2006/54/EC =

Directive 2006/54/EC
- European Union directive
- Title: Directive on the implementation of the principle of equal opportunities and equal treatment of men and women in matters of employment and occupation
- Made by: European Parliament and Council
- Made under: Art. 13 TEC
- Journal reference: L204

Equal Treatment Directive 2006 (2006/54/EC) is a directive in European Union law, which implements the principle of equal treatment between men and women in EU labour law.

== Background ==
Since the Treaty of Amsterdam came into force in 1999, new EU Directives, which require member states to enact legislation with specified characteristics, have been enacted in the area of anti-discrimination. The Equal Treatment Directive 2006/54/EC is a consolidation of previous Directives in this area, notably, the Directive 76/207/EEC, which was amended by Directive 2002/73/EC.

== See also ==
- Anti-discrimination law
- Directive 76/207/EEC
- EU labour law
- List of European Union directives
- UK labour law
