= Omnichannel retail strategy =

Business model by which a company integrates both offline and online presences

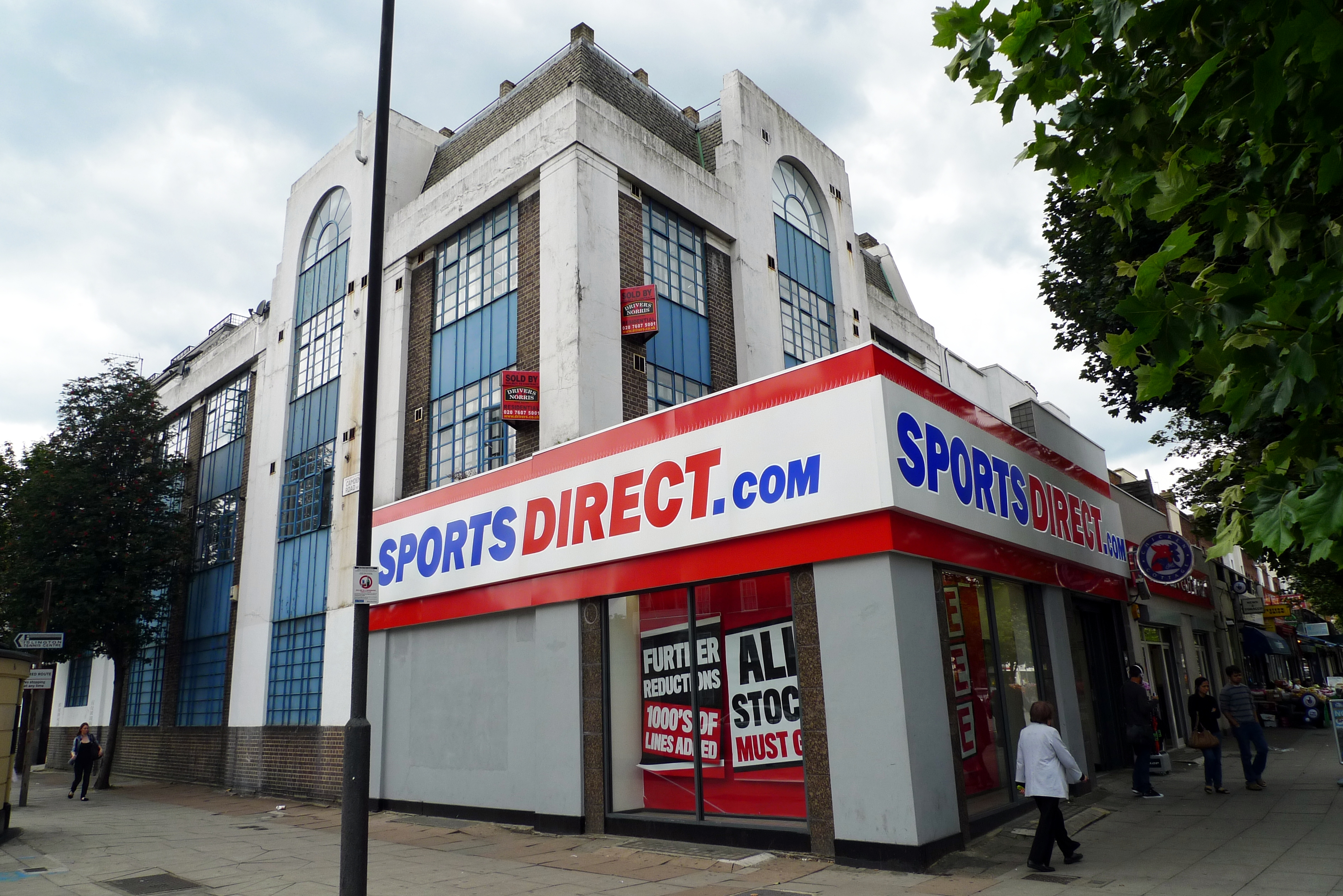
A Sports Direct storefront advertising the web arm of the business. Sports Direct started trading in 1982 with a single brick-and-mortar store but has recently grown rapidly aided by a bricks and clicks business model.

Omnichannel retail strategy (abbreviated omni; also called bricks and clicks, click and mortar, or WAMBAM (Note: "web application meets bricks and mortar")) is a business model by which a company integrates both offline (bricks) and online (clicks) presences, sometimes with a third extra "flips" (physical catalogs).

By the mid-2010s, many (brick and mortar) retailers offered ordering via their website, mobile phone apps, as well as by voice over the telephone. The wide uptake of smartphones made the model even more popular, as customers could browse and order from their smartphone whenever they had spare time.

== Variants ==
=== Home delivery ===
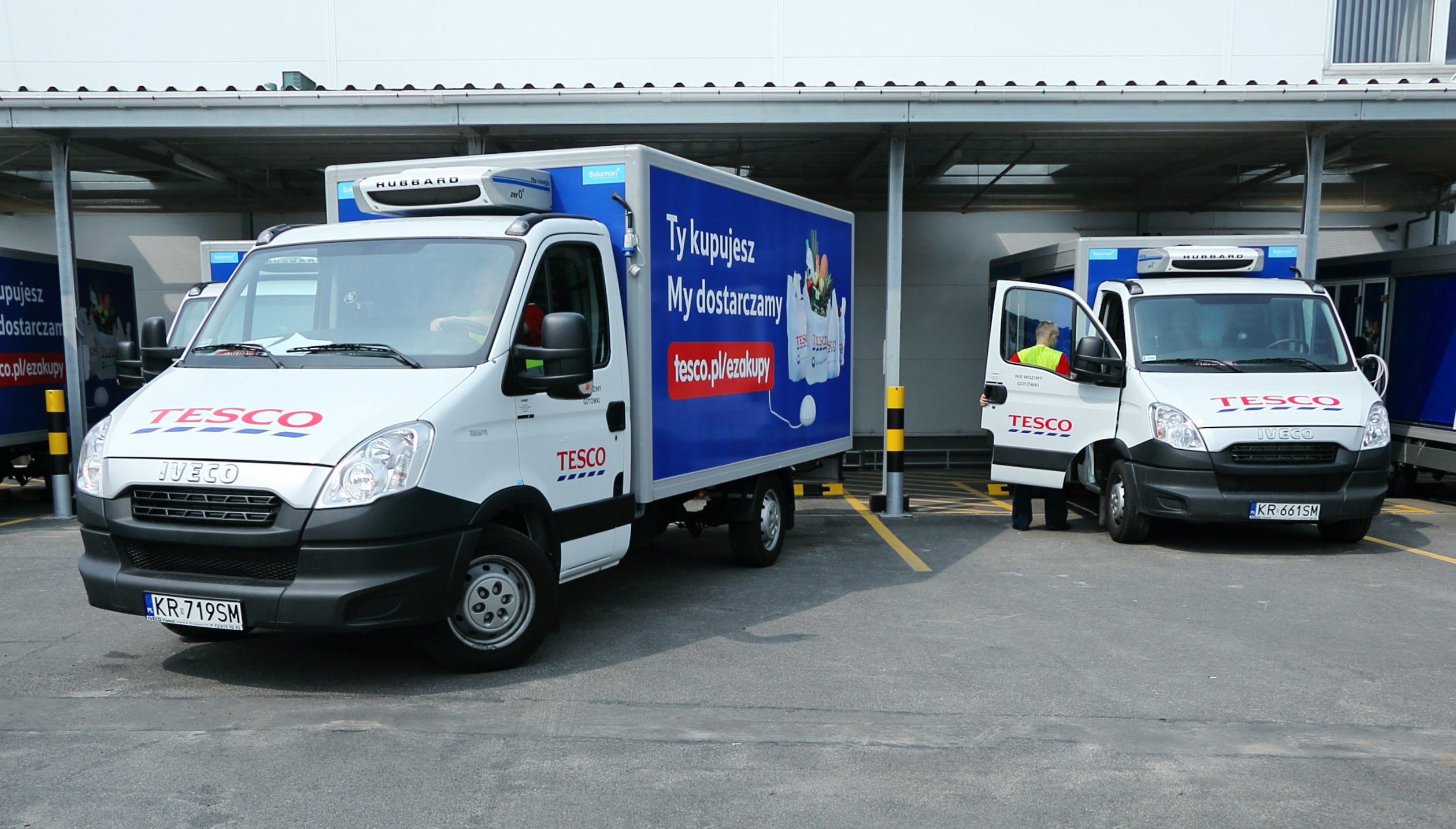
A Tesco delivery van in Poland advertising online ordering and delivery from a brick-and-mortar store. Tesco started their online presence in 1996.

The default model in e-commerce is one of browsing and ordering online, with goods sent from a warehouse, or in some cases, a retail store. One of the first known purchases from a company arguably operating a bricks and clicks business model was a Pizza Hut pizza ordered over the internet in 1994. The great surge in adoption of the bricks and clicks model came around 2000, with large retailers, such as Walmart, starting websites that allow users to browse some of the same goods that they would find in store from their personal computer screens.

=== "Click and collect" (at-store pick-up) ===
Another implementation of the omnichannel model is when a store offers consumers a choice of purchasing products either online to be picked-up later inside or outside one of their retail stores (click and collect, curbside pickup). The model has many alternative combinations, as well as the related omnichannel concept of showrooming where customers try on clothing in person but the actual purchased product is ordered in-store on the retailer's website and delivered to their home later. By the mid-2010s, the success of the model had discredited earlier theories that the Internet would render traditional retailers obsolete through disintermediation.

==== In the U.K. ====
In the UK, the method is known as "Click and Collect". This term was invented by British retailer Argos who already offered "Ring and Reserve" and "Text and Take Home" offerings for telephone and SMS ordering respectively, where goods would be held so the customer would pay in store. As these existing services used alliterations for their name, they needed a name for their online ordering proposition and came up with Click and Collect.

British retailer John Lewis has found success in adopting a bricks and clicks business model, with the online ordering service outperforming brick and mortar sales for several years running. Online auction website eBay have also launched a scheme in cooperation with catalogue shop Argos that allows goods sold by third parties to be collected in a brick-and-mortar location, which allows the customer to collect goods at their convenience rather than wait at home for a delivery company.

==== In the U.S. ====
"Click and Collect" started later in the United States, but by 2019 was common at major big box retailers, such as Home Depot, Target, and Walmart, and at other retailers. The International Council of Shopping Centers found that more than a third of customers who picked up orders made additional purchases while doing so, with that number increasing to 86% during the Thanksgiving to New Year's holiday season. Nonetheless, U.S. retailers were some years behind their European peers in adopting the practice, which had not yet reached a scale where it posed a significant challenge to Amazon.

==== Elsewhere ====
In Greece, by contrast, in December 2020, it was reported that 90 percent of small business retailers did not have the infrastructure to enable click and collect or curbside pickup.

=== "Direct to boot" (curbside pickup) ===
With the arrival of COVID-19 and consumers' desire not to enter retail stores for fear of exposure to the virus, curbside pickup took off. A variant on "Click and Collect", customers order online or by phone and pick up the merchandise, packed and ready to put in their car trunk, at the curb of the retail store or warehouse. As of September 2020 nearly 44% of U.S. retailers offered such a service. Curbside pickup sales had increased more than 500% versus the end of 2019. The strategy is also called "Buy online, pick up in store" or BOPIS.

With COVID-19, curbside pickup expanded to supermarkets and small businesses.

Even after the worst of the pandemic, people wanted to continue ordering items and picking them up.

== Advantages ==
=== For companies ===
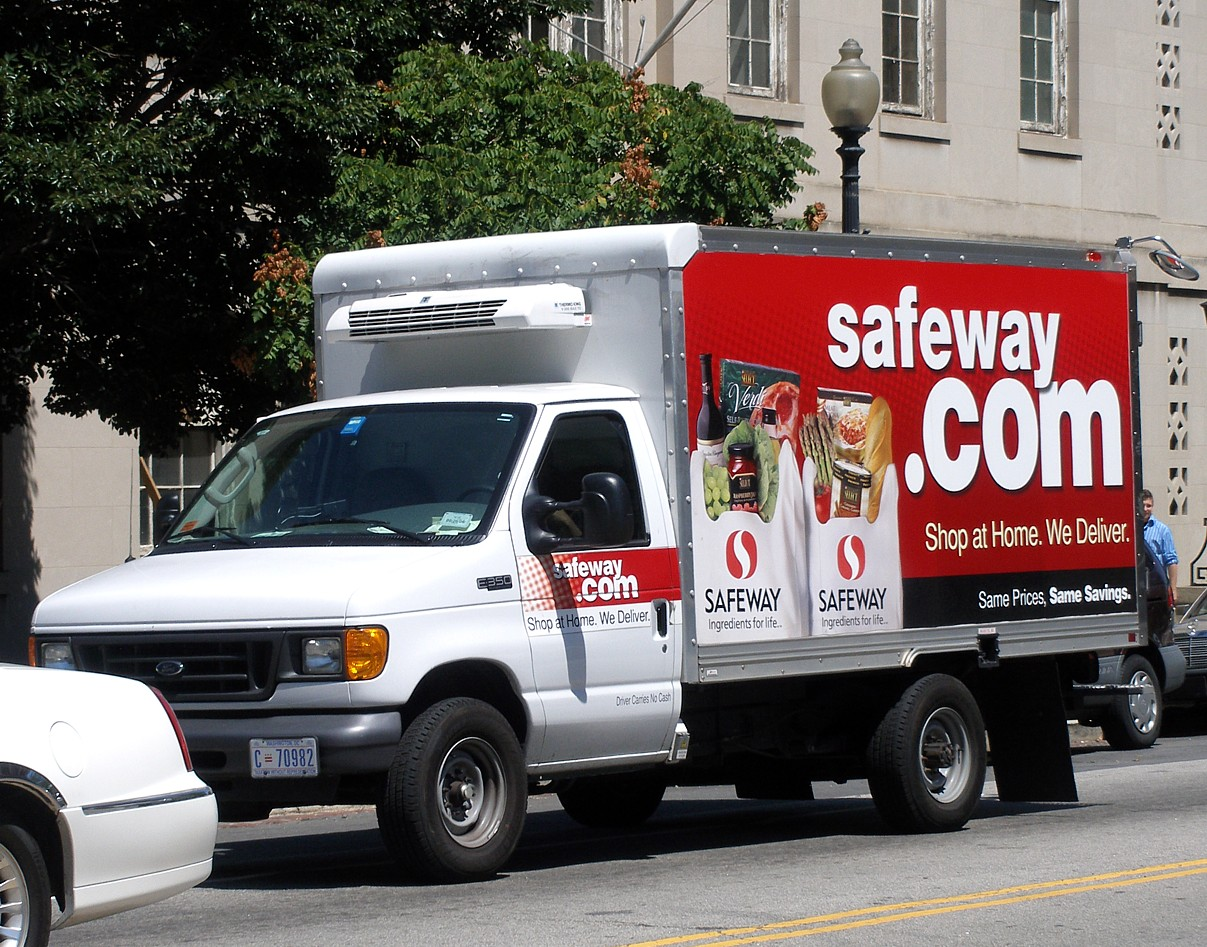
A Safeway delivery truck illustrates how some traditional supermarkets are now pursuing a bricks and clicks strategy.

The term bricks and clicks has been used by Ad Age to refer to an omnichannel retail strategy, e.g. Walmart. This model has typically been used by traditional retailers who have extensive logistics and supply chains, but are well-known and often respected for their traditional physical presence. It is far easier for a traditional retailer to establish an online presence than for a start-up company to employ a successful online one, or for an online-only retailer to establish a traditional presence, including a strong and well-recognised brand, without having a large marketing budget. Adoption of a bricks and clicks model where a customer can return items to a brick and mortar store can reduce wasted costs to a business such as shipping for undelivered and returned items that would traditionally be incurred.

=== For consumers ===
A bricks and clicks business model can benefit various members of a customer base. For example, supermarkets often have different customer types requiring alternative shopping options; one group may wish to see the goods directly before purchase and like the convenience of shopping in person on short notice, while another group may require a different convenience of shopping online and getting the order delivered when it suits them, having a bricks and clicks model means both customer groups are satisfied. Other previously online-only retailers have stated that they have found benefit in adding a brick-and-mortar presence to their online-only business, as customers can physically see and test products before purchase as well as get advice and support on any purchases they have made. Additionally, consumers are likely to feel safer and have more confidence using a bricks-and-clicks business if they already know the brand from a brick-and-mortar store. Ordering and picking up has an advantage for families with children because the parents do not have to get their children out of the car. Also, during hot weather, the car does not get hot again if the shopper does not have to leave the car.

== Disadvantages ==
=== For firms ===
A major factor in the success or failure of this business model is in the control of costs, as usually maintaining a physical presence —paying for many physical store premises and their staffing— requires larger capital expenditure which online only businesses do not usually have. Conversely, a business selling more luxurious, often expensive, or only occasionally purchased products —like cars— may find sales are more common with a physical presence, due to the more considered nature of the purchasing decision, though they may still offer online product information. However, some car manufacturers such as Dacia have introduced online configurators that allow a customer to configure and order complete cars online, only going to a dealership to collect the completed car, which has proven popular with customers.

"On the other hand, an online-only service can remain a best-in-class operation because its executives focus on just the online business." It has been argued that a bricks and clicks business model is more difficult to implement than an online only model. In the future, the bricks and clicks model may be more successful, but in 2010 some online only businesses grew at a staggering 30%, while some bricks and clicks businesses grew at a paltry 3%. The key factor for a bricks and clicks business model to be successful "will, to a large extent, be determined by a company’s ability to manage the trade-offs between separation and integration" of their retail and online businesses.

=== For consumers ===
- Some argue that online shopping, which makes price comparison easier for customers, encourages a 'race-to-the-bottom', where retailers only compete on price, with quality and service deteriorating as a result. This is especially prevalent when comparison shopping websites such as mySupermarket allow prices to be compared without even visiting a retailer's website.
- The prices listed online may not match the prices listed offline. The reasons for this include mis-management, and economics (overhead cost of an online purchase and an offline purchase is different). This may result in confusion and deviations of expectations for the buyers.
- Buyers may end up buying more items than they need, because online businesses are able to show them more items, more promotions, and more advertisements.

== Legislation ==
An advantage to the consumer and a potential disadvantage to businesses is that by adopting a bricks and clicks business model and allowing customers to purchase goods or services remotely, it is legislated in many jurisdictions that consumers are granted more rights to protect them. In the UK, for example, any goods purchased from a bricks and clicks business over a 'click and collect' service would allow the buyer protection under the Consumer Protection (Distance Selling) Regulations 2000, namely the right to return a product or cancel a service within 14 days of purchase for a full refund. Similar rights are afforded to EU Residents, who gain protection under European Directive 97/7/EC. In the US, the Federal Trade Commission legislate specifically over how a distance sale should be conducted and the rights that a consumer has, namely a '3 day' rule allowing items ordered over the web to be returned within three days.

An example of a retailer falling foul of this legislation is British clothing retailer Next, who were found to be breaking the laws by only allowing a customer to return goods that they had ordered if they paid return postage costs.

== See also ==
- Brick and mortar business
- Electronic business
- Business model
- Business-to-business electronic commerce
- Business-to-consumer electronic commerce
- E-marketing
- Management
- Marketing management
- Marketing
- Online auction business model
- Strategic management
