= General George =

General George may refer to:

- Harold Huston George (1892–1942), U.S. Air Force brigadier general
- Harold L. George (1893–1986), U.S. Air Force lieutenant general
- Randy George (fl. 1980s–2020s), U.S. Army lieutenant general
- General George (retailer), a former carpet retailer in the United Kingdom

== See also ==
- John St George (1812–1891), British Army general
- Johann Georg, Chevalier de Saxe (1704–1774), Saxon Army general
