= Andy Clarke (businessman) =

British businessman

- Born: Andrew James Clarke; January 1964 (age 61)
- Occupation: retailer
- Title: former CEO, Asda
- Term: 2010-16
- Successor: Sean Clarke

Andrew James Clarke (born January 1964) is a British businessman. He was the CEO of the Asda chain of supermarkets from 2010 to 2016, until he was replaced by Sean Clarke (unrelated), the head of parent company Walmart's operations in China.

He began his career as a Fine Fare, the supermarket chain, then in 1984 at the age of 21, Clarke joined Morrisons as a grocery manager. About 1992, he took over Asda's flagship supermarket in Edinburgh and had increasing responsibility from there. In 2000, he joined discount clothing chain Matalan as chief operating officer, and then worked at McKinsey & Company and Iceland supermarket. He rejoined Asda in 2005 and became the chief operating officer.

In November 2017, Clarke joined the food tech start-up Spoon Guru as its chairman.
