= Floors-2-Go =

- Type: Retail
- Industry: Retail trade
- Founded: 1999
- Defunct: 2017
- Fate: Liquidation
- Headquarters: Birmingham, United Kingdom
- Number of locations: 30 (2015)
- Area served: United Kingdom; Northern Ireland
- Key people: Robert Hodges; Richard Hodges
- Products: Flooring
- Website: www.floors2go.co.uk//

Floors-2-Go was a wood flooring retailer in the United Kingdom, established in 1999. In 2012, the company's affiliates took over Allied Carpets in a pre-pack administration deal.

== History ==
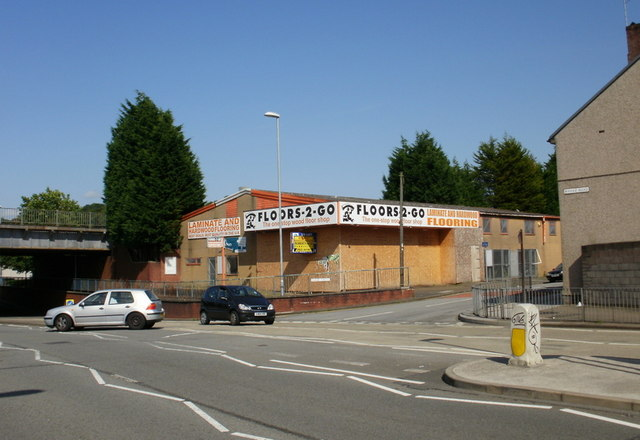
Floors-2-Go, Newport, 2009

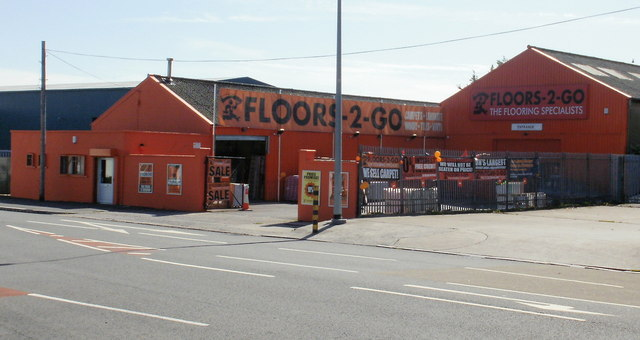
Floors-2-Go, Cardiff, 2009

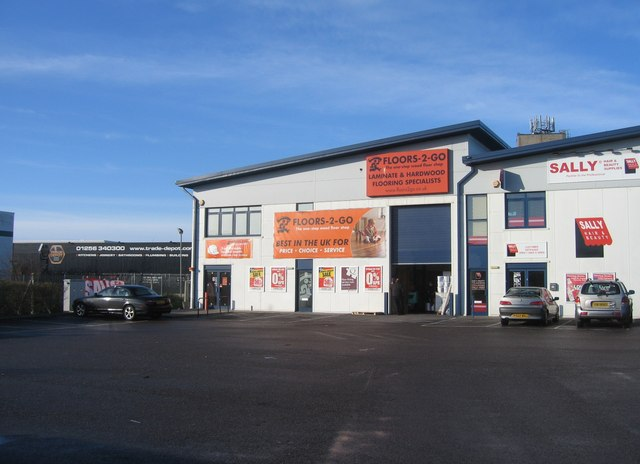
Floors-2-Go, Basingstoke, 2008

Floors-2-Go was founded in 1999 as a family business, with the first store opening in Birmingham. In 2004, the firm floated on the London Stock Exchange. This saw the firm evolving from cash-and-carry (wholesale)-type warehouses to retail superstores.

In 2005, Floors-2-Go opened its first stores in Northern Ireland. Later that year, the company announced plans to expand to around 350 stores.

In 2007, Floors-2-Go was sold for £52.4 million to its directors and private equity firm Alchemy Partners, at which point it ceased trading on the London Stock Exchange.

=== Administration ===
In 2008, the firm entered administration for the first time, with its business hit by a slump in the housing market. The administrators, Kroll immediately closed 41 of the group's 132 stores, resulting in 97 redundancies from a workforce of around 450.

The firm was saved but entered administration for a second time in 2011. Senate Recovery, the administrators, closed a further 53 stores, but retained 35.

In 2014, the business entered administration for the third time. MB Insolvency were appointed administrators, and made a further reduction in the number of stores and staff... However, the business re-entered administration the following year, this time with a jail threat to the brothers who owned the chain.

The company was eventually dissolved in 2017.
