= Roger Burnley =

British business executive

Roger Burnley CBE
- Born: Roger Michael Burnley; June 1966 (age 60); Dewsbury, Yorkshire, England
- Education: Heckmondwike Grammar School
- Alma mater: Bournemouth University
- Title: Former CEO of Asda
- Term: January 2018 - August 2021
- Predecessor: Sean Clarke
- Spouse: Lucy Burnley
- Children: 2

Roger Michael Burnley CBE (born June 1966) is a British businessman, and was the chief executive (CEO) of Asda from January 2018, when he succeeded Sean Clarke, until August 2021.

== Early life ==
Burnley was born in Dewsbury, Yorkshire, and grew up in Yorkshire. He was educated at Heckmondwike Grammar School. He earned a degree in geography from Bournemouth University.

== Career ==
He started his career as a graduate trainee with B&Q.

From 1996 to 2002, he worked for Asda, rising to supply chain director.

Burnley was Sainsbury's retail and operations director before joining Asda as chief operating officer in 2016 and then deputy chief executive in June 2016.

On 30 October 2017, it was announced that he would succeed Sean Clarke as CEO of Asda.

Burnley left Asda on 6 August 2021, six months earlier than expected, leaving Asda without a CEO.

He was appointed Commander of the Order of the British Empire (CBE) in the 2022 New Year Honours for services to the food supply chain.

Burnley became a non-executive director of the food business Finnebrogue in 2022, following the death of its founder Denis Lynn.

== Personal life ==
Burnley is married, has two children and lives in Yorkshire. He a lifelong fan of Huddersfield Town A.F.C.
