= Sean Clarke =

British businessman

Sean John Clarke (born January 1968) is a British businessman, and was the head of Walmart's operations in China. He returned to Asda as the newly appointed CEO of the company on 11 July 2016. He has replaced Andy Clarke (unrelated), who was CEO from 2010 to 2016.

On 30 October 2017, it was announced that Roger Burnley would succeed him as CEO of Asda on 1 January 2018.
