= 2007 United Kingdom petrol contamination =

Contamination of supermarket petrol

Tesco supermarket petrol pump at night

The 2007 United Kingdom petrol contamination problem arose on 28 February 2007, when motorists in South East England reported that their cars were breaking down. This was caused by silicon contaminated unleaded petrol, sold by several supermarkets, that damaged the lambda sensors in engine management systems.

== The problem ==
On 28 February 2007, motorists in South East England reported that their cars were breaking down. Motorists blamed supermarket petrol with most of the fuel sold by the supermarkets in the South East coming from the Vopak terminal in the Thames Estuary. Harvest Energy, which supplies Asda, shares tank facilities at the depot in West Thurrock with another oil company, Greenergy, which is part owned by Tesco and supplies both Tesco and Morrisons.

Then, on the evening of 2 March, scientists who had been testing the petrol reported finding traces of silicon in the fuel which were subsequently tracked down to four storage tanks by Harvest Energy.

Morrisons immediately announced that it was to stop selling unleaded petrol at 41 outlets supplied by the Vopak terminal, while Tesco was emptying and refilling tanks at 150 petrol stations, but was not suspending sales. The following day, Asda said it was replacing unleaded petrol at the 30 forecourts in the South East as a "precautionary measure".

By Sunday, 4 March, tests from Tesco and Asda had found contamination of silicon in unleaded fuel.

== The cause ==
The Society of Motor Manufacturers and Traders (SMMT) said it believed suspect fuel might have damaged lambda sensors in some cars' systems, leading them to cut power to prevent damage to the engine. Silicon products are used as 'anti-foaming agents' in diesel fuel, but even very small quantities can cause serious problems in petrol engines.

== Consequences ==
Tesco was criticised with claims that they had been alerted to the problem as early as 12 February. Affected motorists faced bills of several hundred pounds to repair their cars and, with up to 10,000 cars needing repair, the suppliers could be liable for compensation claims of up to £10 million. On 4 March, it was announced that a class action, on behalf of affected motorists, would be mounted.

Trading Standards officials advised motorists to keep petrol receipts, take a sample of the fuel, obtain quotes from garages for repair costs and approach the petrol station where the fuel was purchased. Then, on 6 March, Morrisons and Tesco offered to pay for any damage caused by the faulty petrol, and Tesco printed full page apologies in many national newspapers.

A further consequence was a rise in petrol prices charged by traditional petrol companies, of up to 4p per litre, across the country. An AA spokesman said "Putting up prices to make a fast buck is completely unjustified. Sometimes garages increase the price to protect stocks from a sudden run. But if anyone has upped the price outside the areas where the problems have been then they are milking the system.". However, the UK Petroleum Industry Association replied "There is no profiteering. Oil products are priced to the market. Pump prices are usually linked to the price of crude oil or the wholesale price of petrol.".

== Further contamination ==
Since the initial problem in 2007, many people have reported problems with their cars after filling up with petrol and diesel at Tesco filling stations. These problems normally caused the engine management light to come on, and ranged from problems with the fuel system to damaged lambda sensors. They may have been caused by silicon or even water found in the underground fuel storage tanks. In December 2015, Tesco in Faversham had a water leak in one of its tanks causing problems for some customers.
