= Asda =

British supermarket chain

Coordinates: 53°47′32″N 1°32′42″W

Asda Stores Limited
- Logo used since 2002

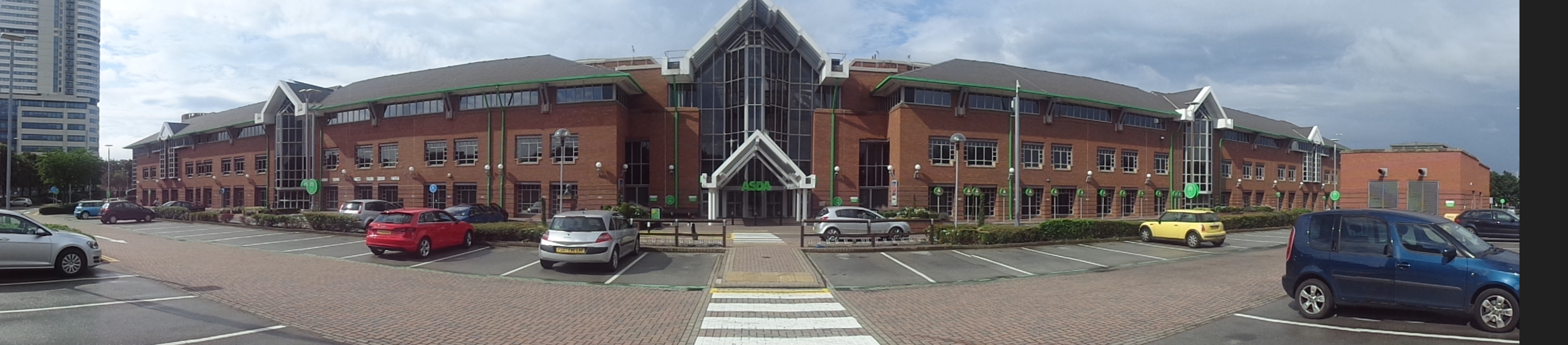
- Asda House in Leeds, the supermarket's headquarters
- Trade name: Asda
- Formerly: Associated Dairies & Farm Stores (Leeds) Limited; Associated Dairies Limited
- Type: Private
- Industry: Retail
- Founded: 19 February 1949; 77 years ago (as Associated Dairies) in Knottingley, West Riding of Yorkshire, England; 3 May 1965; 61 years ago (as Asda)
- Founders: Peter Asquith; Fred Asquith; Sir Noel Stockdale
- Headquarters: Leeds, West Yorkshire, England
- Number of locations: 1,106 (2025)
- Area served: United Kingdom
- Key people: Allan Leighton (chairman); David Potts (CEO)
- Products: Grocery; General merchandise; Financial services
- Services: Asda Living; Asda Mobile; Asda Money; Asda Rewards; George
- Revenue: ▲£21.9 billion (excluding fuel, 2023)
- Operating income: ▲ >£1 billion (2023)
- Owner: TDR Capital (67.5%); Mohsin Issa (22.5%); Walmart
- Number of employees: 150,000 (2022)
- Subsidiaries: Asda Mobile; Asda Money
- Website: asda.com

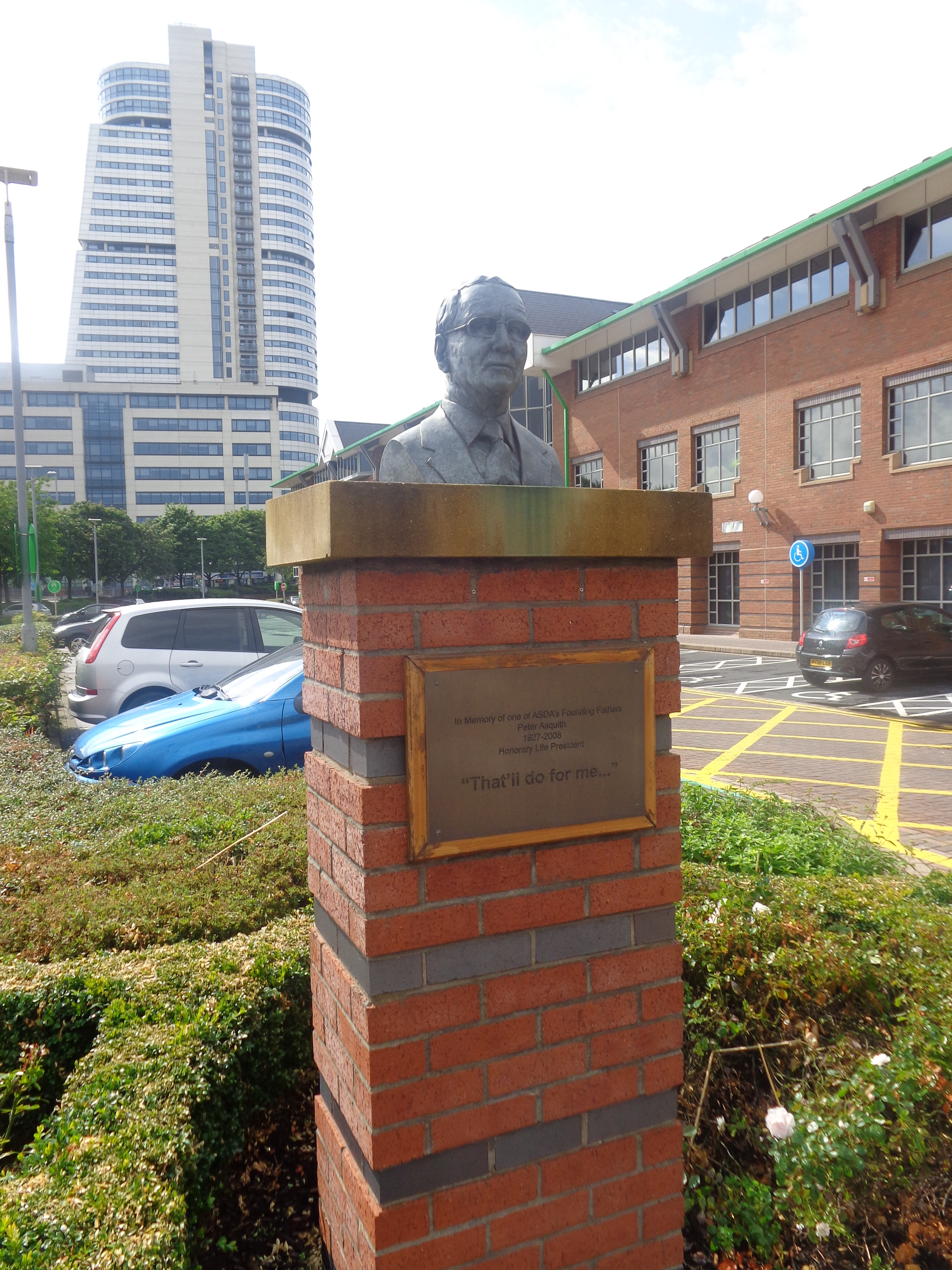
A bust of co-founder Peter Asquith outside Asda House in Leeds

Asda Stores Limited (/ˈæzdə/), trading as Asda, is a British supermarket and petrol station chain. Its headquarters are in Leeds, England. The company was incorporated as Associated Dairies and Farm Stores in 1949. It expanded into southern England during the 1970s and 1980s, and acquired Allied Carpets, 61 large Gateway supermarkets and other businesses, such as MFI. It sold these acquisitions during the 1990s to concentrate on its supermarkets. It was listed on the London Stock Exchange until 1999 when it was acquired by large American retailer Walmart for £6.7 billion. Asda was the second-largest supermarket chain in the United Kingdom between 2003 and 2014 by market share, at which point it fell into third place. As of December 2025, its market share in the UK is 11.4 per cent.

Besides its core supermarkets, the company also acts as a white label payment card provider offering assistance for insurance and payment services under the Asda Money brand and also has a mobile virtual network operator.

In February 2021, the Issa brothers and TDR Capital acquired Asda, with Walmart retaining "an equity investment" in Asda, a seat on the board and "an ongoing commercial relationship". The deal came after a merger with Sainsbury's was rejected by the Competition and Markets Authority in April 2019. TDR Capital became the majority owner of Asda in November 2024 after buying Zuber Issa's 22.5 per cent holding, owning 67.5% of the company; Mohsin Issa owns a 22.5% stake but withdrew from running the company in September 2024.

== History ==
=== Early years ===
The Asquith family were butchers based in Knottingley, West Yorkshire. In the 1920s, they expanded their business to seven butcher shops in the area. Their sons, Peter and Fred, later became founding members of Asda.

Around the same time, a group of West Riding dairy farmers, including the Stockdale family and Craven Dairies, joined under the banner of J. W. Hindell Dairy Farmers Ltd. The company diversified in 1949 to become Associated Dairies and Farm Stores Ltd, with Arthur Stockdale as the managing director.

=== 1960s and 1970s ===
Asda logo used from 1970 to 1978

In 1963, the Asquith brothers converted an old cinema, the Queens in Castleford, into a self-service supermarket. Another followed in the old indoor market at Edlington. Both stores traded under the name of Queens. Their next store was a purpose-built supermarket in South Elmsall.

In 1965, the Asquith brothers approached Associated Dairies to run the butchery departments within their small store chain. A merger was proposed and the Asquiths' business was joined with Noel Stockdale's to form a new company, Asda (Asquith + Dairies).

By 1967, the company had set up a store in Billingham, County Durham. By 1969, Noel Stockdale bought out the Asquith brothers' stake and became chairman of the company.

Asda took advantage of the abolition of retail price maintenance to offer large-scale, low-cost supermarkets. This was aided by the decision in the mid-1960s to acquire three struggling US-owned branches of the GEM retail group. The Government Exchange Mart stores in Preston, Lancashire, Cross Gates, Leeds and West Bridgford, Nottinghamshire, had accumulated losses of £320,000 and offered to sell the stores for 20% of whatever Asda could recoup as losses from the Inland Revenue. They received the whole amount back. The rent was only 10 shillings (50p) per square foot on a 20-year lease, with no rent reviews, Asda increased GEM's £6,000 per week sales to around £60,000 per week in just six months with the new stores named as Asda.

During the 1970s, with over 30 stores in the north of England, Asda began expanding south, with the opening of new stores in the Estover area of Plymouth, Devon and Gosport, Hampshire in 1977. In 1978, Asda acquired Allied Carpets.

In 1982, the first London store opened in Park Royal, near Ealing. The Isle of Dogs and Charlton stores followed on rapidly thereafter.

=== 1980s and 1990s ===
In 1984, managing director John Hardman made attempts to halt Asda's decline, which included the introduction of Asda branded products. In 1985, Asda merged with MFI (Mullard Furniture Industries) and the group was renamed Asda-MFI Group plc.

Asda established its headquarters at Asda House. The site was officially opened in 1988 by the then Prime Minister, Margaret Thatcher.

By the end of the 1990s, the company's Asdale clothing range was replaced by the George brand, after the newly formed George Davies partnership with Asda.

==== Near bankruptcy and merger prospects ====
Asda logo used from 1994 to 2002

With stores mainly based in the north of England, the newly focused food retail group expanded further south in 1989 by purchasing the large format stores of rival Gateway Superstores for £705 million. The move left the company overstretched as a result, and by 1991, it found itself in serious financial trouble with over £1 billion of debt; compounding the situation further was a declining customer base, which was mainly caused by Asda's focus on moving upmarket resulting in prices rising to levels significantly higher than competitors.

The company's first response was to change its management; chairman John Hardman was ousted in June 1991 and was replaced by Patrick Gillam, and Archie Norman was appointed chief executive in October. Asda then completed a rights issue in November 1991 that raised £357 million and cut the company's debts to £668 million. Underperforming stores were initially converted to a new discount format called Dales but this had been scrapped by 1998. In 1993, Asda completed a second rights issue that raised a further £347 million and began selling off some of its assets; some stores were sold to competitors, and the Allied Carpets chain was sold to Carpetland. By 1995, the company had returned to profitability and had virtually wiped out its debt – this is cited as one of the most successful turnarounds in British retail history.

Norman succeeded Gillam as chairman upon the latter's retirement in 1996, appointing then-deputy Allan Leighton as chief executive, and began to remodel Asda's stores along the lines of Walmart, the world's largest retailer. Leighton travelled to Bentonville, Arkansas, to assess and photograph the systems and marketing deployed by Walmart. In 1998, following the Walmart model, Asda began opening larger Hypermarket (later Supercentre) stores as well as introducing pharmacies and cafes to its stores. At the same time, merger discussions were taking place between Asda and other retailers such as Safeway and Kingfisher plc; both ended without an agreement being reached, but in 1999, a second round of discussions with Kingfisher later reached an agreement for a £5.4 billion merger that would have both created the United Kingdom's largest multi-category retailer and enabled Asda to begin operating stores throughout Europe.

=== 2000s and 2010s: Walmart years ===
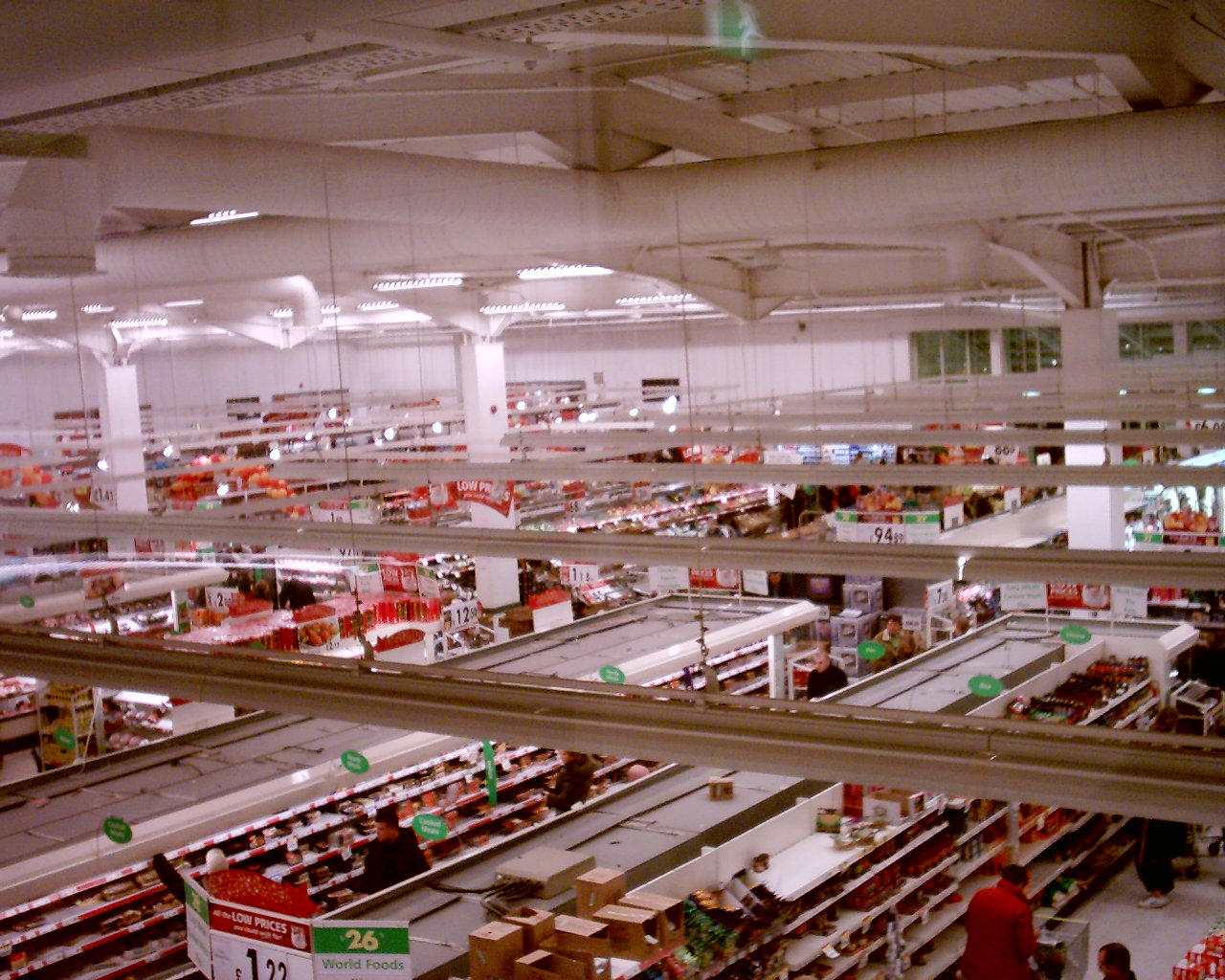
Interior of an Asda supermarket in 2003

A merger deal was abandoned when Walmart outbid Kingfisher to purchase Asda for £6.7 billion, which was completed on 26 July 1999 in a move that was initially regarded by the British media as a potential corporate raid. As Walmart were keen on entering the British market, Bob Martin, Walmart's president of international operations, lobbied Prime Minister Tony Blair on planning issues.

In 2005, amid reported concerns within Walmart about a slippage in market share, partially due to a resurgent Sainsbury's, Asda's chief executive, Tony De Nunzio left, and was replaced by Andy Bond. In 2005, Asda expanded into Northern Ireland by purchasing 12 former Safeway stores from Morrisons.

In December 2007, Asda, Sainsbury's and various other retailers and dairy firms admitted to the price fixing of dairy products between 2002 and 2003. The price operation was calculated to have cost consumers around £270 million. In a statement, Asda said "Everyone at Asda regrets what happened, particularly as we are passionate about lowering prices. Our intention was to provide more money for dairy farmers, who were under severe financial pressure at the time." In total, Asda was fined £18.21 million by the Office of Fair Trading for its part in the cartel.

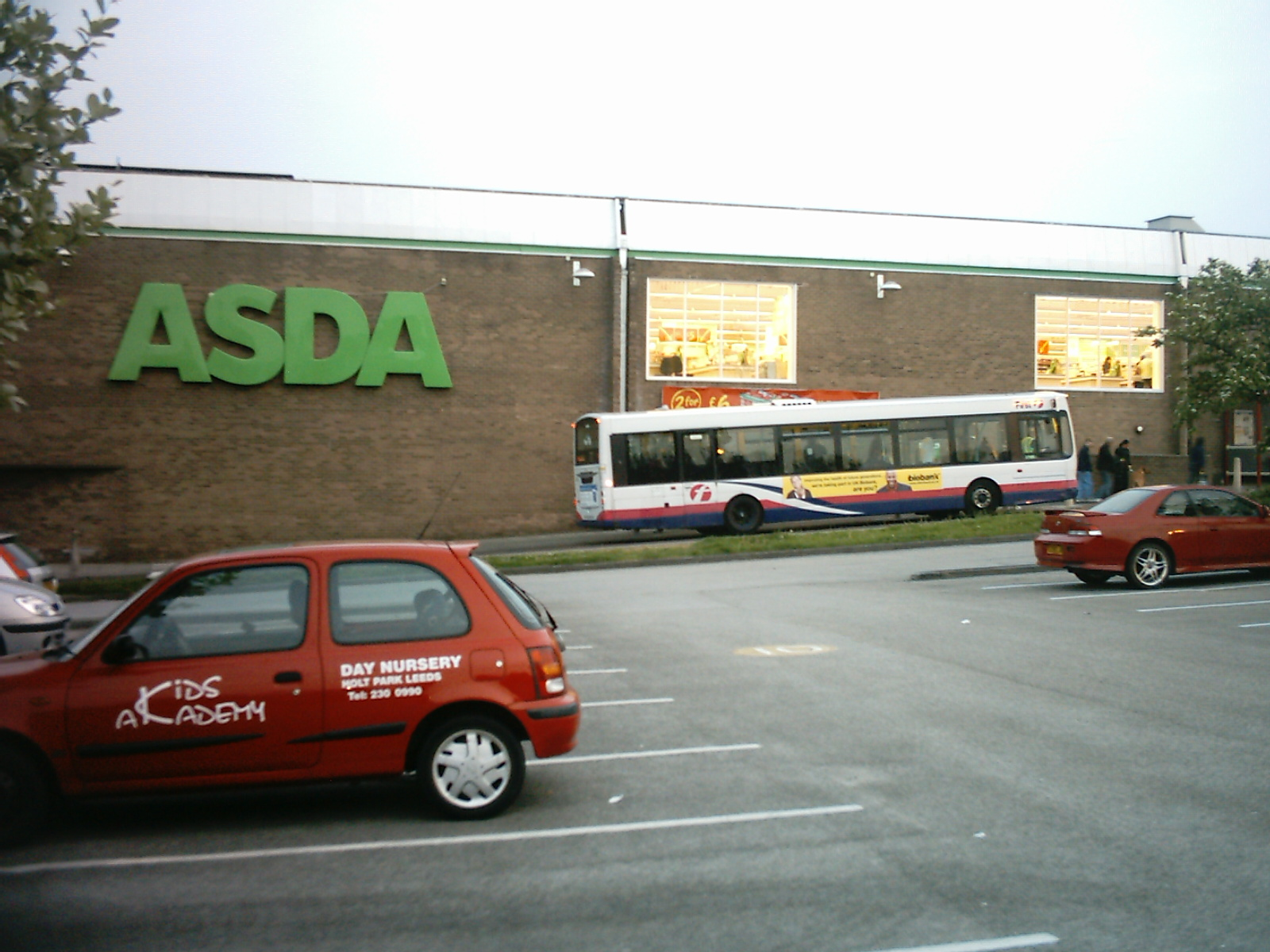
A smaller, older Asda supermarket in Holt Park, Leeds in 2008. The store has since been reclad.

Asda's property development arm, Gazeley Limited, was sold to Economic Zones World (EZW), a Dubai World subsidiary, in June 2008 for in excess of £300 million.

In November 2008, there were reports that Asda was to buy Irish retailer Dunnes Stores. In August 2009, Walmart sold Asda for £6.9 billion to its Leeds-based investment subsidiary Corinth Services Limited. The deal was described as part of a "group restructuring" and meant that Asda remained under the control of Walmart.

=== Advertising issues ===
In 2009, the Advertising Standards Authority (ASA) challenged whether a press ad which showed a large green arrow bearing down on a smaller yellow arrow with a crumpled tip and "Asda 2955 products cheaper" should set out how the general price claims made in the ads could be verified by consumers. Because it was not possible for consumers or competitors to check the products and prices used in the comparison using mySupermarket.co.uk, and because the ads did not set out how consumers and competitors could check that information for themselves, the ASA concluded that the ads did not satisfy the criterion of verifiability as defined in the 2006 European Court of Justice ruling, and were therefore in breach of the advertising codes. The ASA ruled that, due to the significant limitations and qualifications to the basis of the price comparison which were not included in the ad, or in the terms and conditions on Asda's website, the approach taken in making the comparisons was unfair and misleading.

In 2009, the ASA ruled that an advert for a proposed new store in New Barnet was misleading, because it compared the floorspace of the development with the floorspace and additional buildings of a Sainsbury's store and with an unapproved Tesco plan.

In 2010, a national press ad for Asda on a double-page spread was headed "The big Asda Rollback" with headings stating "Lower prices on everything you buy, week in week out" with equal prominence to a column headed "Lower prices than any other supermarket"; that the arrows underneath the heading "Lower prices than any other supermarket" compared prices at Asda with prices at Sainsbury's, Tesco and Morrisons. The ASA ruled that in the context in which it appeared, it was ambiguous in that it could be interpreted either as referring to price reductions that had taken place within Asda or to price comparisons with the named competitors. In addition, because the ad did not explain that the price reductions had not necessarily taken place in the week that immediately preceded the ad, they concluded that the headings which stated the number of price reductions that had taken place in each product category were misleading. The ASA also concluded that the "Lower prices than any other supermarket" claim in the advert was misleading. The ASA disagreed, and referred to the claim "Everything is at least half price!" was likely to imply to viewers that all toys were included in the sale. As all toys were not included in the sale, and in the absence of a qualifying statement, the ad was misleading.

A press ad, which appeared on 26 September 2011, was headlined "Only one supermarket is ... always 10% cheaper or we'll give you the difference guaranteed". However, at the top of the ad there was a banner that contained the claims "SALE", "Half Price", "Price Drop", "50% off", "1/2 price", "cheap" and that part of the headline claim "... always 10% cheaper" appeared in bold text in the middle of the ad. The ASA considered the banner, together with the headline was likely to be interpreted by consumers as claims that referred to the price of Asda goods. Since consumers could interpret that claim as one which guaranteed to refund the difference, should Asda not be the lowest on price, the ASA considered the presence of the claim "only one supermarket is always 10% cheaper" could create the impression that Asda were always 10% cheaper and would be interpreted as a 'lowest price' claim. The ASA therefore concluded that the advert was misleading. It also noted the footnote explaining the APG contradicted Asda's absolute claim that they were always the lowest on price, and that the disclaimer was also misleading.

The ASA ruled in 2011 that a television advertisement and two national press ads did not give sufficient prominence to the fact that exclusions applied. Another advertisement from Asda, in which it featured World Cup related products and an Asda price guarantee was misleading as the World Cup related products were exclusive to Asda and not, therefore, available at Morrisons, Tesco or Sainsbury's.

=== Expansion ===
In April 2010, Asda announced plans to open over 100 new non-food stores as part of an ambitious five-year plan. These plans were mothballed shortly after because of the recession and the reining in of spending by consumers on non-food purchases. On 11 May 2010, Andy Clarke, the chief operating officer, was appointed as CEO. In the same month Asda bought the original Netto UK supermarket chain in a £778 million deal. In February 2011, Asda announced the purchase of six stores from Focus DIY; five of these were converted into supermarkets later that year. On 16 April 2012, Asda launched their Android grocery shopping app and mobile website for non-grocery items with a plan to fully integrate mobile platforms into stores. The app allowed customers to create shopping lists and scan item barcodes for more information about them.

In February 2013, DNA tests revealed that horsemeat was present in meat supplied by many UK suppliers. When Asda's Chosen By You fresh beef bolognese sauce was the first instance found, Asda said: "We are withdrawing the beef bolognese sauce from our shelves with immediate effect." Asda later stated they shared food shoppers' "anger and outrage". In August 2013, Asda withdrew a "Tranny-saurus Rex" greeting card range from its shelves following complaints that it was offensive to the transgender community.

During Pride Month in June 2020, amidst the background of the COVID-19 pandemic, ASDA said on Twitter that its temporary LGBT Pride branding, including the use of the Rainbow Flag, was adopted in support of the NHS, and not in support of Pride. Asda later released a statement, stating that this previous tweet was an "honest mistake" and reiterated that these were indeed the "colours of the pride flag to show our support for the LGBTQ+ community". According to QueerAF, Asda has been accused several times of homophobic and transphobic behaviour, with a notable "history of transphobia from the brand". Asda has stated it supports LGBT Pride and a diverse workforce.

Logo of Asda from 2015

In 2015, Asda adopted Walmart's slogan: "Save Money. Live Better". Around the same time they adopted an updated logo, with Walmart's yellow spark surrounding the first letter. The spark was later removed. In June 2016, it was announced that Andy Clarke, CEO since 2010, would be replaced by Sean Clarke, the head of parent company Walmart's operations in China.

In October 2017, Asda announced that the current CEO, Sean Clarke would be replaced by Roger Burnley, the deputy CEO, from 1 January 2018, and the sixth CEO since 2000.

In November 2017, Asda recruited Jesús Lorente, from French hypermarket retailer Carrefour. He became CMO (Chief Merchandising Officer), in January 2018, and was put in charge of the fresh food and general merchandise offer within all stores. After reportedly clashing with Roger Burnley and only six months in his post, Lorente left Asda at the end of July 2018. His role was divided up between Burnley and Anthony Hemmerdinger.

==== Abandoned merger with Sainsbury's ====
In April 2018, Sainsbury's and Walmart announced negotiations about a possible merger of Sainsbury's and Asda, creating the largest supermarket chain in the UK. Under the plans, Walmart would own 42% of the combined business, which would be led by the existing chief executive of Sainsbury's, Mike Coupe. The group would also open branches of Argos within Asda stores. The merger underwent intense scrutiny from a cross-party group of MPs who were chairing select committees for the proposed merger and the Competition and Markets Authority, who were inundated with complaints from suppliers and other major retailers who complained of the damage they felt would be inflicted upon them if the deal was approved. On 25 April 2019, the CMA blocked the proposed merger, suggesting that it would increase prices for consumers and make competition unfair for other UK retailers. Sainsbury's then announced that it was abandoning the merger.

=== 2020s ===
In October 2020, the first Asda sustainability store was opened in Middleton, Leeds, featuring refill stations, loose fruit and vegetables, and recycling stations, as well as a community zone. The company ended the initiative in 2024, with the move being called "grim news" by The Grocer.

In December 2020, undercover footage was filmed at farms that supplied meat to Asda and Sainsbury's. The footage captured turkeys being ill-treated. A worker was suspended and an official investigation was launched. In December 2021, an undercover video filmed by French activists appeared to reveal that unprofitable piglets were being extremely badly treated. An Asda spokesperson said: "We take animal welfare extremely seriously and as soon as we were made aware of these claims we launched an investigation with the supplier."

==== Acquisition by the Issa brothers and TDR Capital ====
In February 2021, Mohsin Issa, Zuber Issa and TDR Capital acquired Asda, which at the time was valued at £6.8 billion. Walmart retained "an equity investment" in Asda, a seat on the board and "an ongoing commercial relationship". In the same month, Asda said that it might need to put 5,000 jobs at risk as part of a reconstruction plan in the context of people shopping online. In March 2021, Asda was involved in the "largest ever sterling bond offering" as part of the financing package to fund the acquisition purchase by TDR Capital and the Issa brothers. Chief executive Roger Burnley retired in August 2021 following the change in ownership. Following Burnley's departure, Mohsin Issa took over running the business.

In May 2023, it was reported that the Issa brothers and TDR Capital had together contributed just £200 million for their purchase of Asda, worth £6.8 billion; the majority of the purchase price was funded by a loan from the parent company of heavily indebted EG Group, and by disposing of Asda assets. In October 2023, Asda completed a £2.27 billion acquisition of EG Group property. This mainly consists of 356 forecourt sites, where the existing Spar stores at these locations were rebranded to Asda Express. The deal also included ownership of fast-food chain Leon, as well as the purchase of 462 Burger King, Greggs and Subway franchises. Asda would later collaborate with Sbarro to integrate franchises. In September 2025, the lease for a single motel in Monmouth that was included in the 2023 acquisition, called Raglan Lodge, was put on the market. In October 2025, Asda sold Leon back to its original founder.

In September 2024, Lord Rose succeeded Mohsin Issa as CEO, supported by TDR Capital's Rob Hattrell. Mohsin Issa retained his ownership stake and assumed a non-executive director role. He would return to EG Group to be its sole chief executive. On 1 November 2024, Zuber Issa sold his 22.5% stake in Asda to TDR Capital, making it the majority owner with control of 67.5% of the company. In early November 2024, Asda announced that it was ordering staff back to the office at least three days a week and cutting head office jobs in an attempt to halt the supermarket's decline. On 25 November 2024, Allan Leighton, who had been CEO from 1996 to 2000, was appointed chairman. He was described as "one of Britain's top corporate fixers", partly responsible for rescuing Asda from insolvency in the late 1990s. The next day, Leighton said that Asda had "a pretty significant war chest" to tackle several years of weak trading, where sales had been falling despite inflation, and that it would take up to five years to turn Asda round.

In February 2025, Asda refinanced £3.2 billion of its debts, delaying the repayment of bonds in 2026, though at a high interest rate of about 8%. In March 2025, Nils Pratley commented that "Asda definitely needs to do something. The business underperformed for years under Walmart’s ownership. Then the Issa brothers, Mohsin and Zuber, and TDR, their private equity backers, loaded it with buyout debt in 2021 and investment suffered again. Asda’s market share has declined from 15.1% to 12.6% over the past five years, according to the research group Kantar’s numbers."

==== New brand identity ====
Logo of Asda since 2024

On 16 May 2024, Asda launched the new brand identity, with new logo, typography and colour scheme. It also features a new slogan: "That's More Like It", and new typefaces designed by Colophon: Asda Display, Asda Subline and Asda Text; in addition to fruit stickers and a new darker green colour. It also features unique features, such as a crossbar under the pence numerals.

The new brand identity has proved popular across the design community, with The Drum describing it as "less shiny and corporate", "less American and much softer", and an "honest, down-to-earth, playful style". However some criticised the new brand identity, especially related to the font's readability by people with dyslexia.

==== £50 million store upgrade programme ====
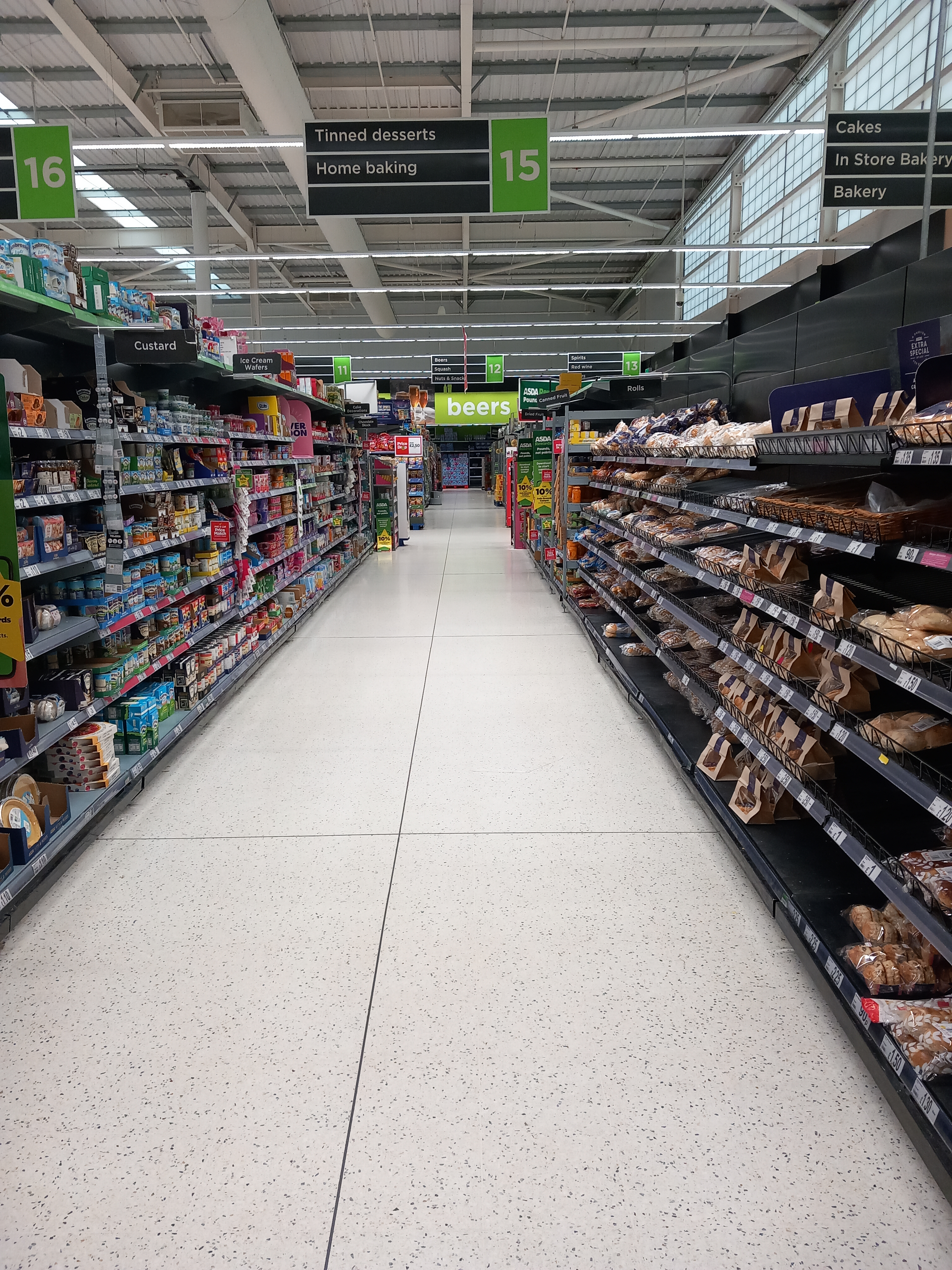
May 2024

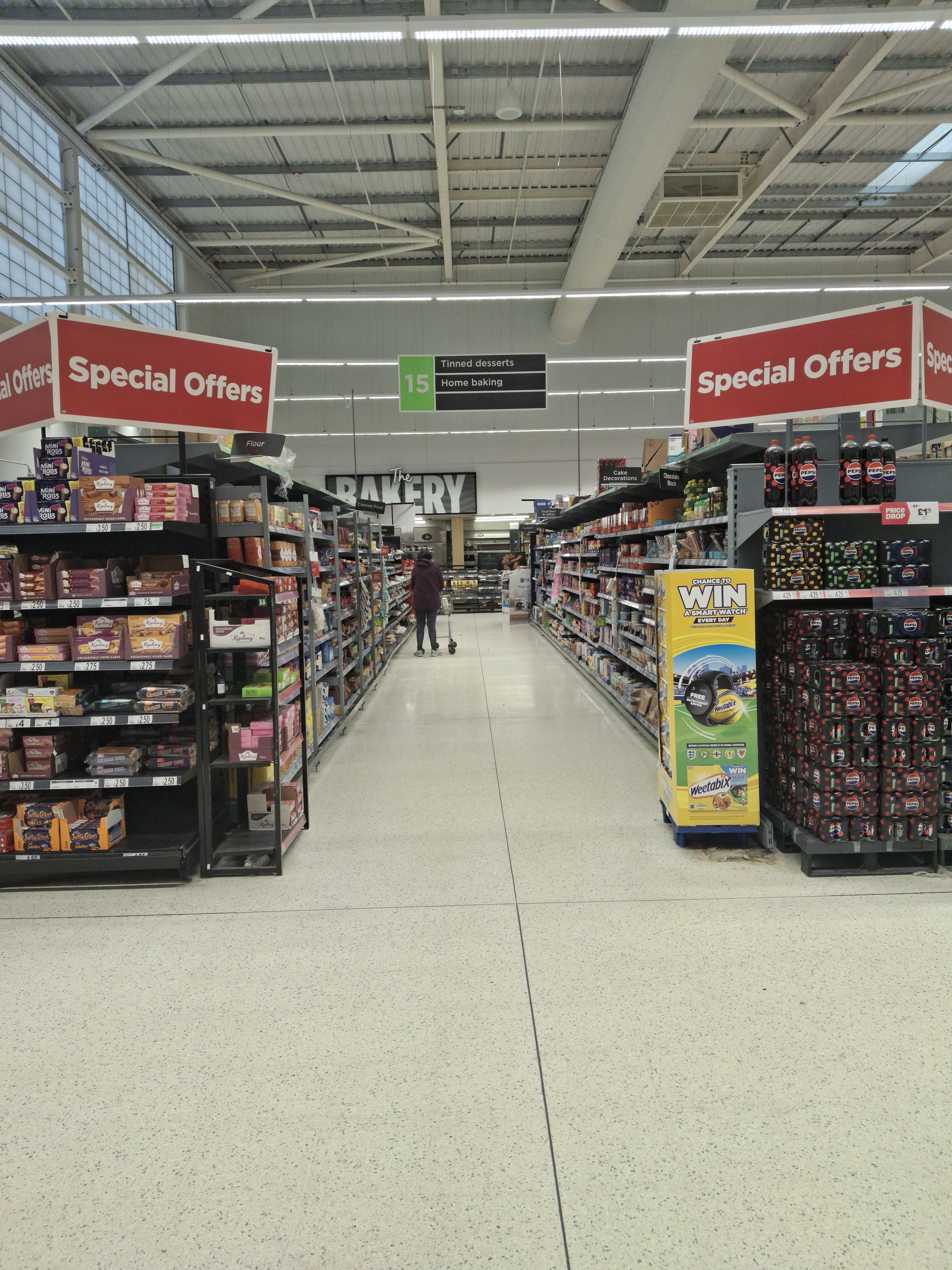
January 2025

Asda in Inverness, before and after the upgrade programme

On 30 May 2024, Asda announced that it would be launching a £50 million store upgrade programme to refurbish its 170 stores, including 50 larger stores, by late November 2024. The 50 larger stores would be refurbished to include new features, including seasonal and food-to-go aisles, counters, flooring and lighting, and, in some stores, new George departments. The 120 other stores would also be refurbished to adopt the new brand identity.

In December 2024, Asda trialled electronic labels, with prices that could be updated instantly, on shelves at Manchester Oxford Road store for 12 weeks.

==== Since 2025 ====
In February 2025, Jo Whitfield rejoined Asda as a non-executive director after eight years. In March 2025, Asda said that its profits were likely to drop as it was going to cut prices and increase staffing. Competitors Tesco, Sainsbury's, and Marks & Spencer were thought likely to lower prices to compete, and their stock prices dropped following the announcement. In May 2025, Asda and Morrisons suspended supplies from a Lincolnshire pig farm linked to abuse against pigs. Secretly filmed footage showed farm workers at Northmoor Farm appearing to grab piglets by their hind legs and smashing them on to the hard floor – a banned method of killing known as blunt force trauma or piglet thumping. Leighton announced a management reshuffle with a series of new senior executive appointments in November 2025. By the end of December 2025, ASDA's market share had fallen to 11.4%. Asda was reported to have had a "dreadful Christmas" in 2025, as in 2024. Asda's sales decreased by 4.2% during the 12 weeks to 28 December 2025, while all its main rivals reported an increase.

On 3 November 2026, David Potts became group chief executive with immediate effect. Allan Leighton, who had been executive chairman since November 2024, stepped back to become non-executive chairman.

== Store formats ==
=== Asda Superstores ===
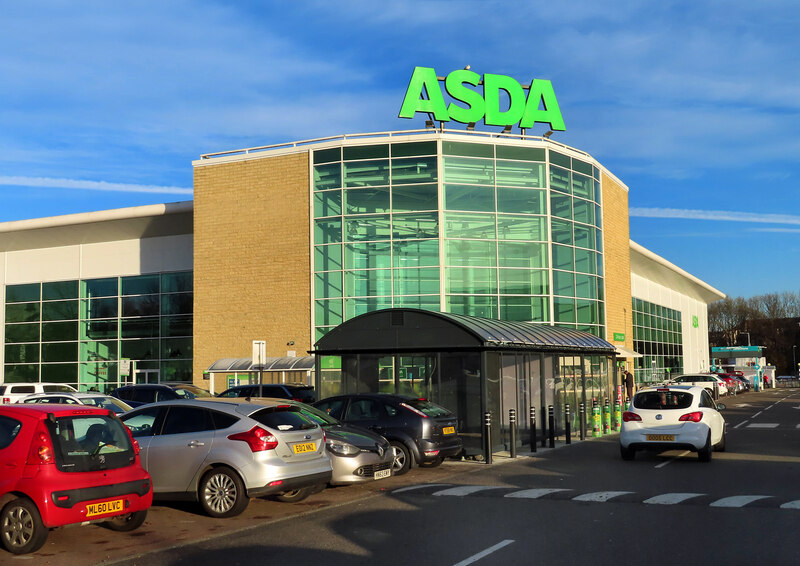
The Alloa superstore, 2023

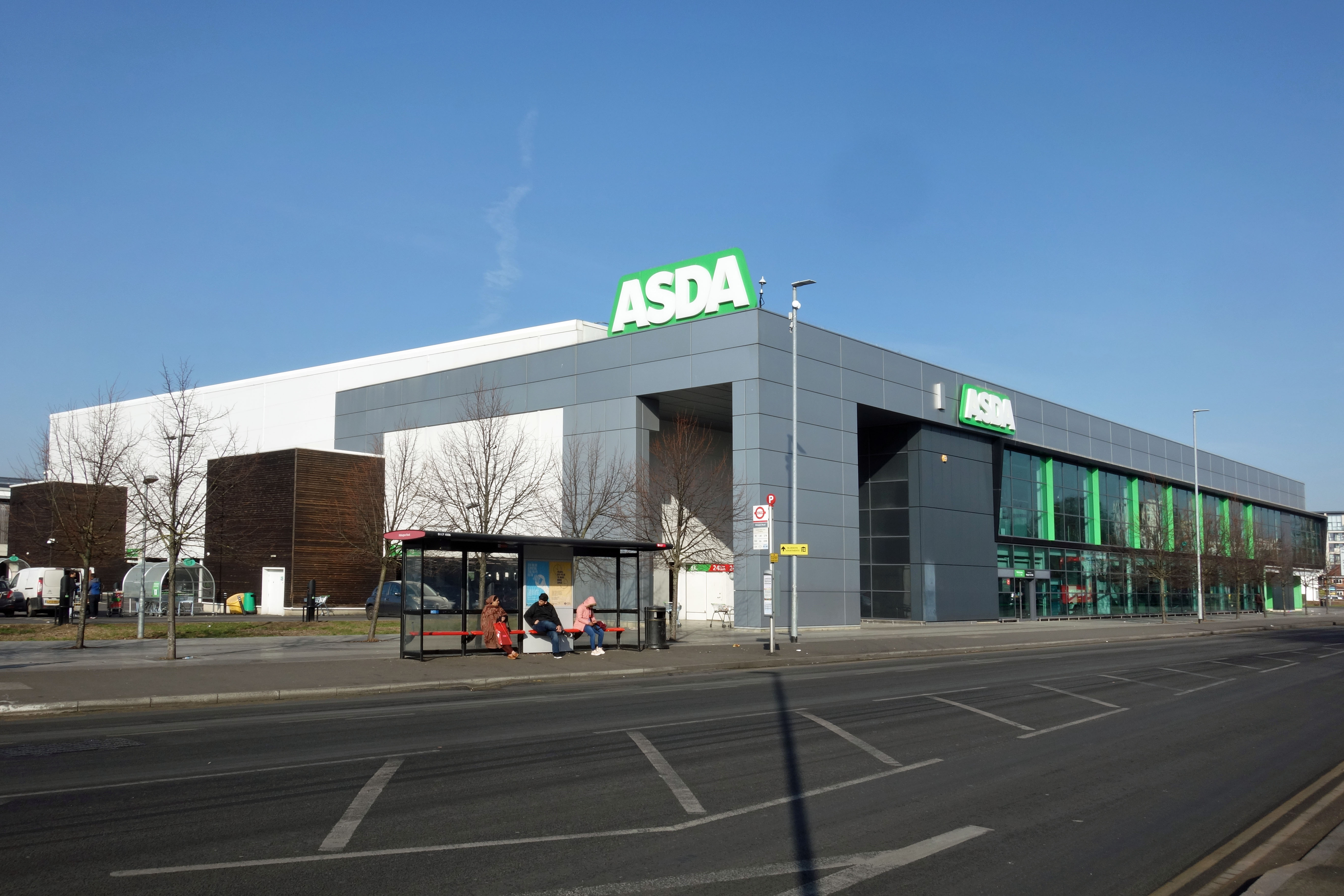
The Hayes superstore, 2023

The Asda Superstores at the Old Kent Road, Scunthorpe, Colindale and Brunstane previously trialled a Subway franchise. There are currently no plans to roll the Subway franchise out across the chain.

=== Asda Supercentres ===
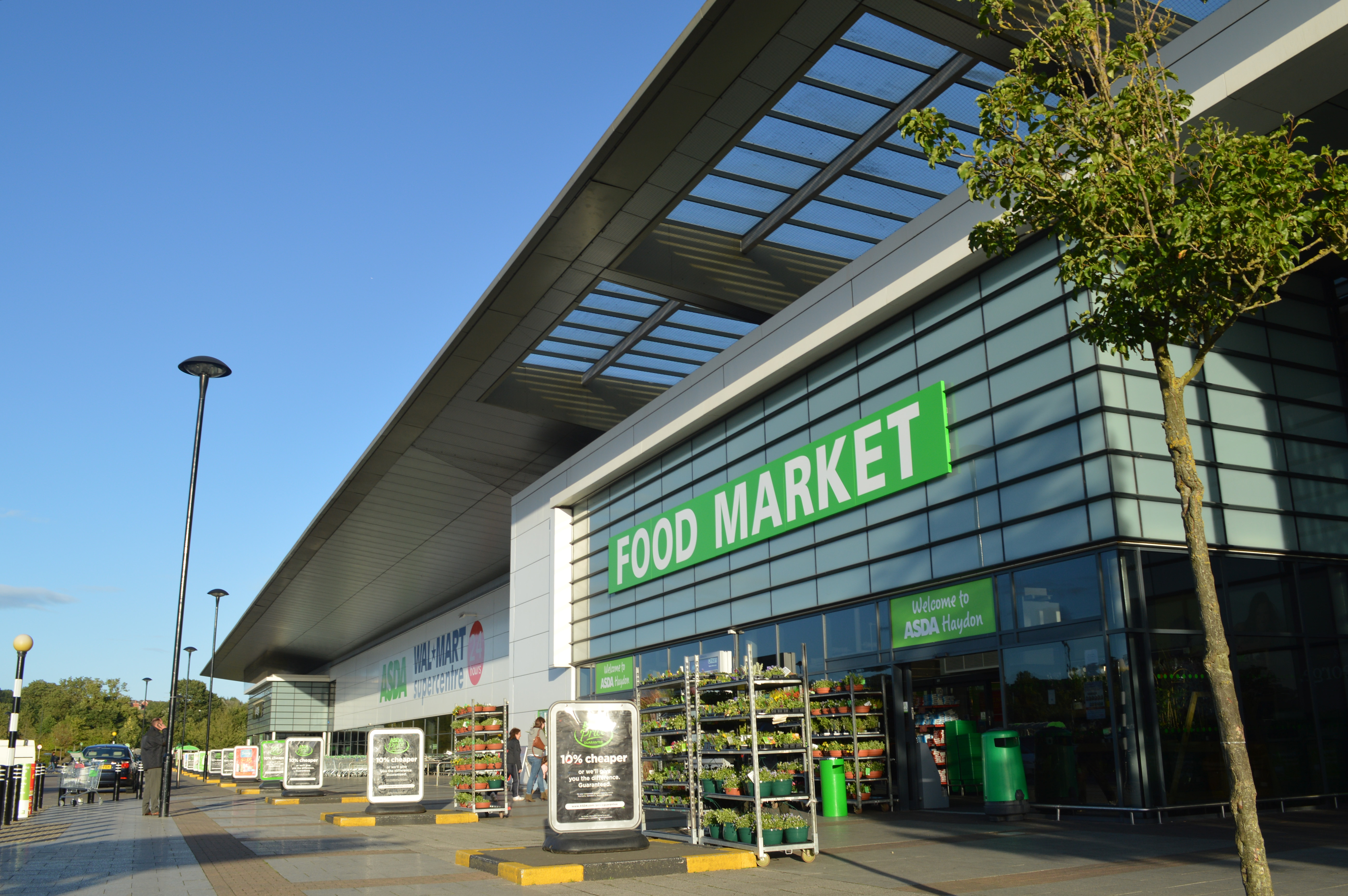
A Supercentre in Haydon, Swindon, branded Asda Walmart in 2013

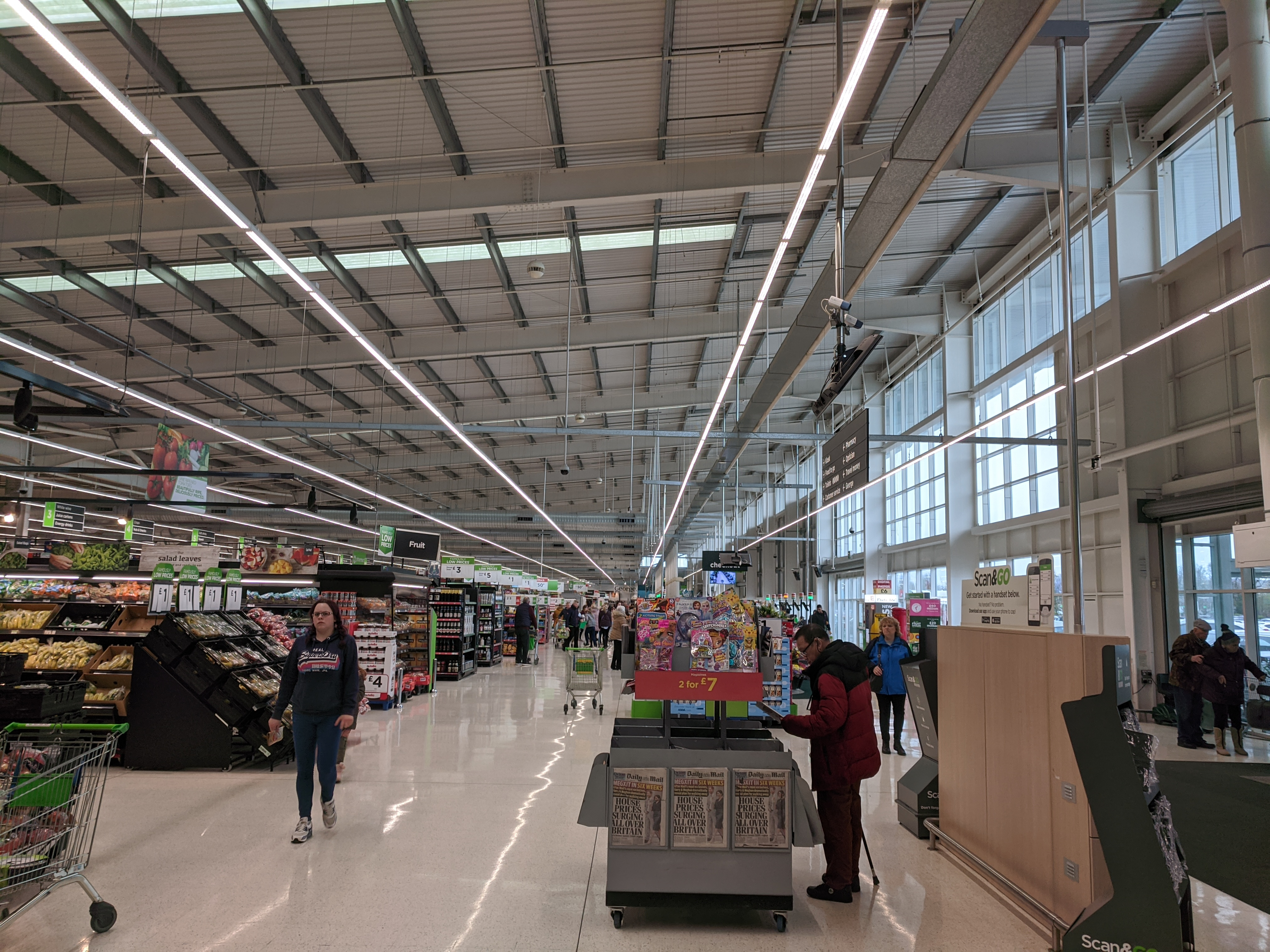
Interior of Asda Supercentre Milton Keynes

The first Asda Supercentre with a sales area of 8,600 m^{2} (93,000 sq ft) opened in Patchway, Bristol in the summer of 2000. The first Scottish Supercentre opened in Livingston, in 2001.

The Bletchley, Milton Keynes Supercentre which opened in November 2005 is currently the largest Asda Supercentre with a net sales floor of over 11,000 m^{2} (120,000 sq ft). This was preceded in June 2002 by the Eastlands, Manchester store which was the largest store at the time with a sales area of 10,000 m^{2} (110,000 sq ft) but is currently the second largest Asda Supercentre, and the third largest is located in Minworth, West Midlands, followed by Patchway. As of 31 January 2021, there are 32 Supercentres.

=== Asda Supermarket ===
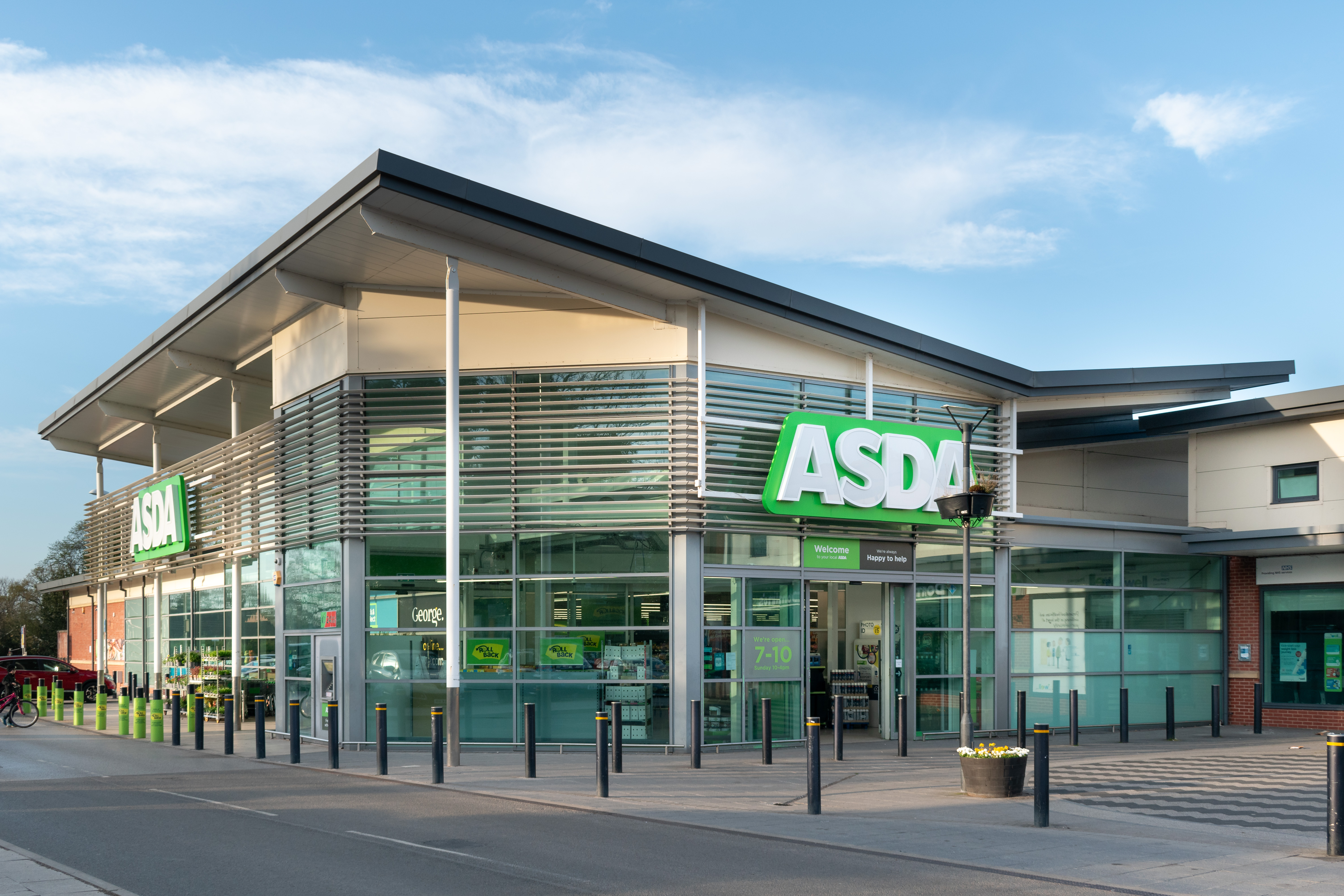
Alsager supermarket, 2025

In May 2010, Asda announced the purchase of the 193 UK stores of Danish discount retailer Netto in a £778 million deal. The remaining stores continued to trade as Netto stores until early 2011, when Asda integrated the stores into its supermarkets division, designated for shops smaller than 2,300 m^{2} (25,000 sq ft). These former Netto stores form the core of the Asda Supermarket format. As of 31 January 2021, there are 207 Asda Supermarkets.

=== Asda Living ===
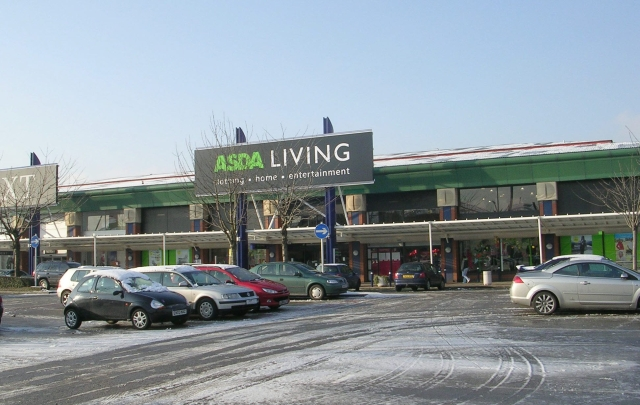
An Asda Living branch in Leeds

As at 31 January 2021, there were 33 home improvement stores using the Asda Living format.

=== George stores ===
In 2008, all George standalone stores were closed as high rental costs had resulted in low profitability.

In 2011, Asda announced its intention to establish a small number of pilot George stores. In January 2012 Asda had agreed to terms with two franchise partners to open international George stores. Through the agreement with SandpiperCI, based in the Channel Islands, the company was responsible for opening George franchises in Jersey and Guernsey, and through the Azadea Group, headquartered in Beirut, Lebanon, the George franchise stores would open in the Middle East.

In May 2025, Asda revived the standalone George brand, with the pilot store opening in the Crown Point Retail Park in Leeds, in a former Asda Living store. Asda also confirmed the store would be run as a trial with a vision to rebrand all former Asda Living stores under the George brand dependent on its success. The new store format includes a rebranded Asda Kitchen Café which is expected to replace all existing in-store cafés eventually.

=== Asda Essentials ===
In April 2006, Asda launched a new trial format called Asda Essentials in Northampton, followed by another in Pontefract a month later. The stores were modelled on France's Leader Price chain, with a smaller floorplate than Asda's mainstream stores and with a primary focus on own-brand products, only stocking branded items that were perceived to be at the core of a family's weekly shop with the aim being to challenge the dominance of Tesco and Sainsbury's in the convenience store market while at the same time addressing competition from discount supermarkets such as Aldi, Lidl and Netto.

On 6 December 2006, The Guardian reported that further planned store openings were under review following poor sales in the existing outlets, while the range of branded products being carried was also being expanded due to customer demand. In January 2007 it was announced that the original Northampton trial store would close within a month after only 10 months of trading.

=== Asda Petrol ===
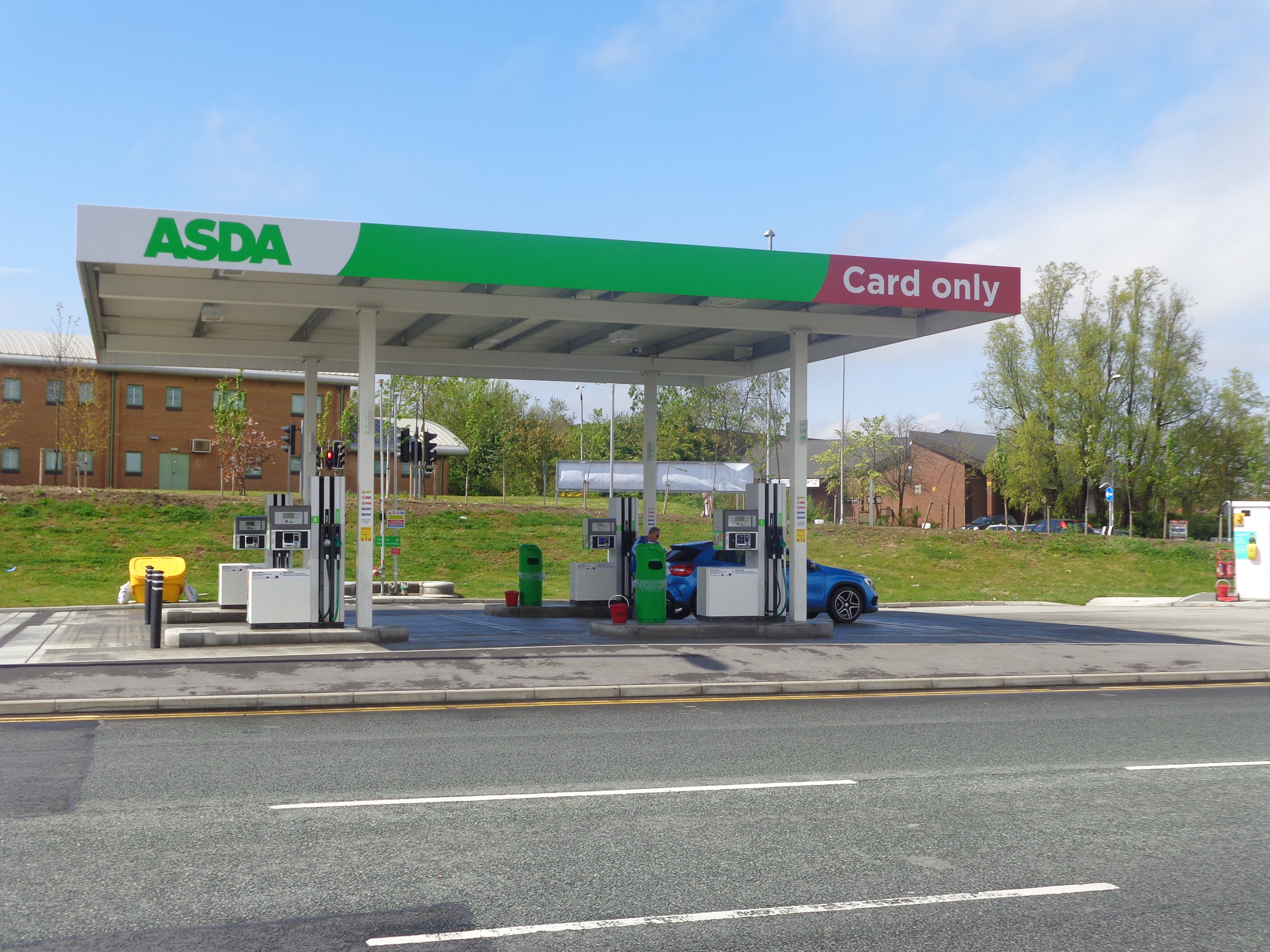
An unstaffed Asda self-service filling station where payment is made at the pump by credit or debit card. This one is in Middleton, Leeds, England.

The company is continuing to add a combination of fully automated credit/debit card payment only petrol stations and petrol stations with traditional forecourt shops within the car parks of its existing store portfolio and to new store sites. As of June 2018, Asda operates 319 petrol stations in total, 18 of which are standalone and the others mostly within the car park area of its stores.

=== Asda Express ===
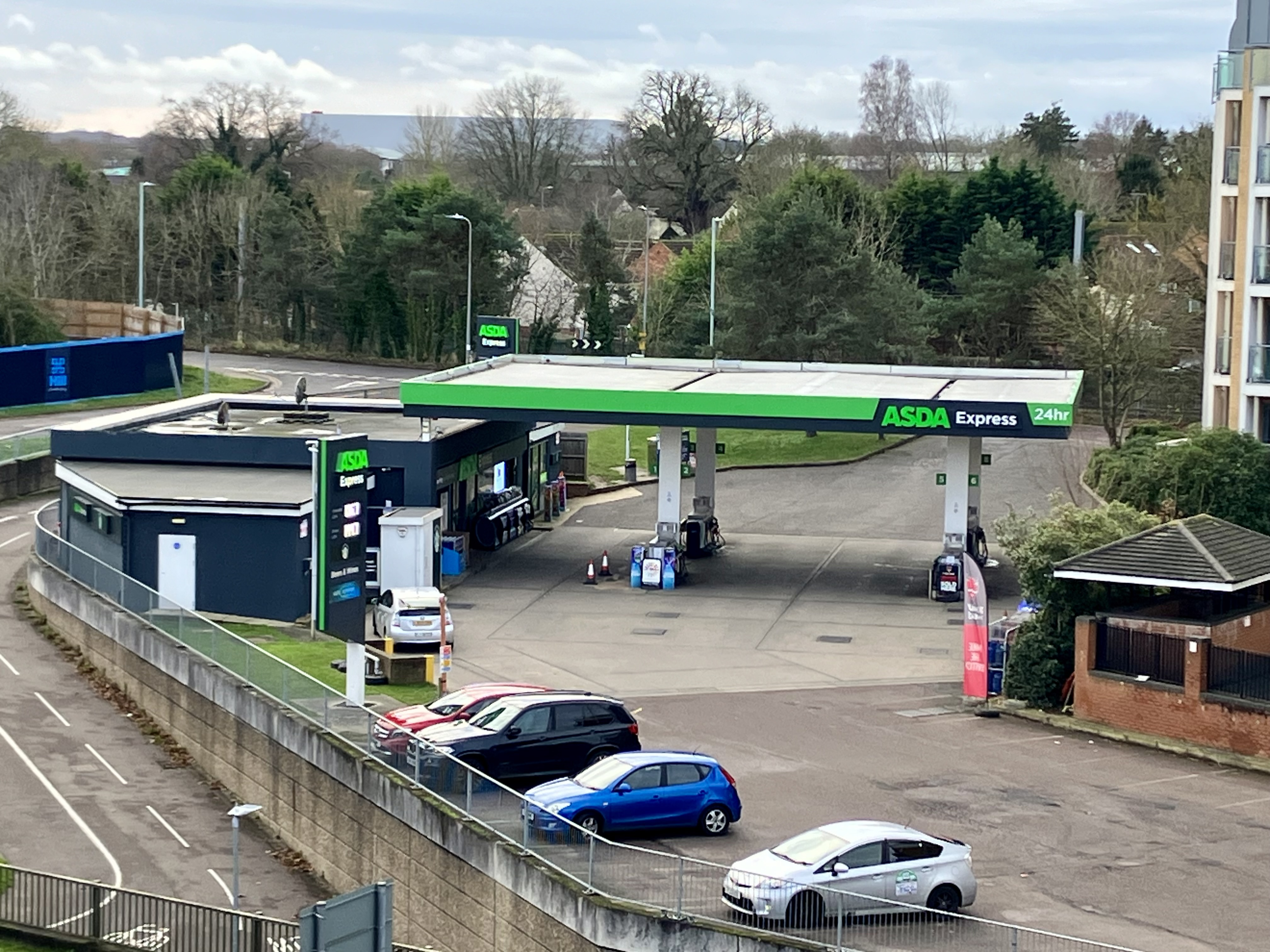
Stevenage Express with petrol station

In October 2020, a petrol station convenience store format launched called Asda On the Move, soon after the Issa brothers' takeover of Asda. The first store opened at the Primley service station in Walsall with 150 outlets trading by April 2023. The Asda On the Move format was designed to gain more market share by entering the convenience market. In November 2022, Asda opened its first convenience stores in the Asda Express portfolio, with the initial stores located in Sutton Coldfield and Tottenham Hale. Following the acquisition of the majority of EG Group and Co-op's forecourts, the number increased from two to 478. This number was expected to increase to 778 by 2026.

=== Asda Express Foodservice ===
Since October 2023, Asda has owned 462 franchises of Burger King, Greggs and Subway, which were included in its purchase of EG Group forecourts.

== Brands and services ==
=== Just Essentials by Asda ===
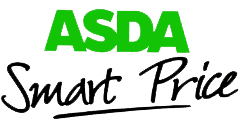
Asda's former Smart Price logo, used until 2012

Just Essentials by Asda, formerly known as Asda Smartprice, is a no-frills private label trade name introduced in 2022, to lower food prices and help struggling customers since the cost of living crisis that began in the UK in 2021, which saw grocery inflation reach several record all-time highs; and retailers battle to retain hard-pressed customers to maintain sales.

=== Chosen By You ===
In 2010, Asda relaunched its mid-tier Asda own label brand. Asda announced that it would be scrapping the Chosen By You brand starting in 2016 and most food products are being moved to a By Asda brand.

=== George clothing ===
Asda has its own range of clothing known as George, which was created and trialled in selected stores in 1989, and officially launched and rolled out to the main superstore estate in 1990. It replaced the older Asdale/Asda clothing labels of the 1970s and 1980s. This is marketed as quality fashion clothing at affordable prices. Walmart also sells the George brand in Argentina, Canada, China, India, Japan, Mexico, and the US (and in South Korea until Walmart pulled out of that market). George clothing is also sold at four stand alone dedicated stores in Malta, the first of which opened in 2013. George is a participant in the Sustainable Clothing Action Plan (SCAP), the ambition of which is to improve the sustainability of clothing throughout its life cycle by helping to reduce the impacts of carbon, water and waste across the fashion sector. The label is named after George Davies, founder of Next, who was its original chief designer. Davies parted company with Asda in 2000 and is no longer associated with the brand.

In 2005, Asda stated that the George range was a £1.75 billion business, including sales from Walmart stores in the United States and Germany. Mintel estimates that George is the fourth-largest retailer of clothing in the United Kingdom, after Marks & Spencer, the Arcadia Group and Next.

In 2007, Asda was the first supermarket to stock wedding dresses. Part of the George line, they cost £60 while adult bridesmaid dresses ranged between £30 and £35, at launch.

=== Asda Mobile ===
Asda also operates a mobile phone network called Asda Mobile, which was launched in April 2007. This was previously provided in partnership with EE, but then in 2021 moved to Vodafone.

=== Asda Money ===
Asda has a financial services brand which offers products provided by other companies. Services offered include car insurance (in partnership with Vast Visibility Ltd), credit cards (issued by Jaja Finance Ltd), personal loans (issued by Aro Finance) and travel money bureaux (provided by Travelex). The financial services division of the organisation does not directly sell these services in store and instead uses the supplier of that product by telephone or online/postal application. Marketing and management of financial services is co-ordinated in house and many stores have a financial services co-ordinator, responsible for promoting the products and ensuring legal compliance. The financial services division is also responsible for gift cards, Christmas Saver and Business Rewards.

=== Medicine ===
Many larger stores have an on-site pharmacy. In July 2020, the company started an in-store virtual general practitioner service in partnership with health tech company Medicspot, to be launched at the Asda Supercentre in Stevenage. Real-time diagnostics – a connected stethoscope, pulse oximeter, blood pressure monitor, contactless thermometer, and a close inspection camera – would be available in the pharmacy and patients could consult a GP remotely without the need to book an appointment in advance. It was initially free, but after 4 July; a charge of £49 was introduced. The Asda pharmacy in Chelmsley Wood joined with local GP practices to deliver flu vaccinations from a van parked outside in October 2020.

=== Asda Radio ===
Asda Radio is the in-store radio station for Asda superstores.

The radio station was originally known as Asda FM, live broadcasting began on 7 September 1991, and it was operated by KVHstudios in Leeds. According to The Guardian, it has a listenership of over 18 million people each week. In 2018, Asda switched the contract for Asda FM from KVHstudios to Mood Media and relaunched as Asda Radio.

=== Asda Rewards ===
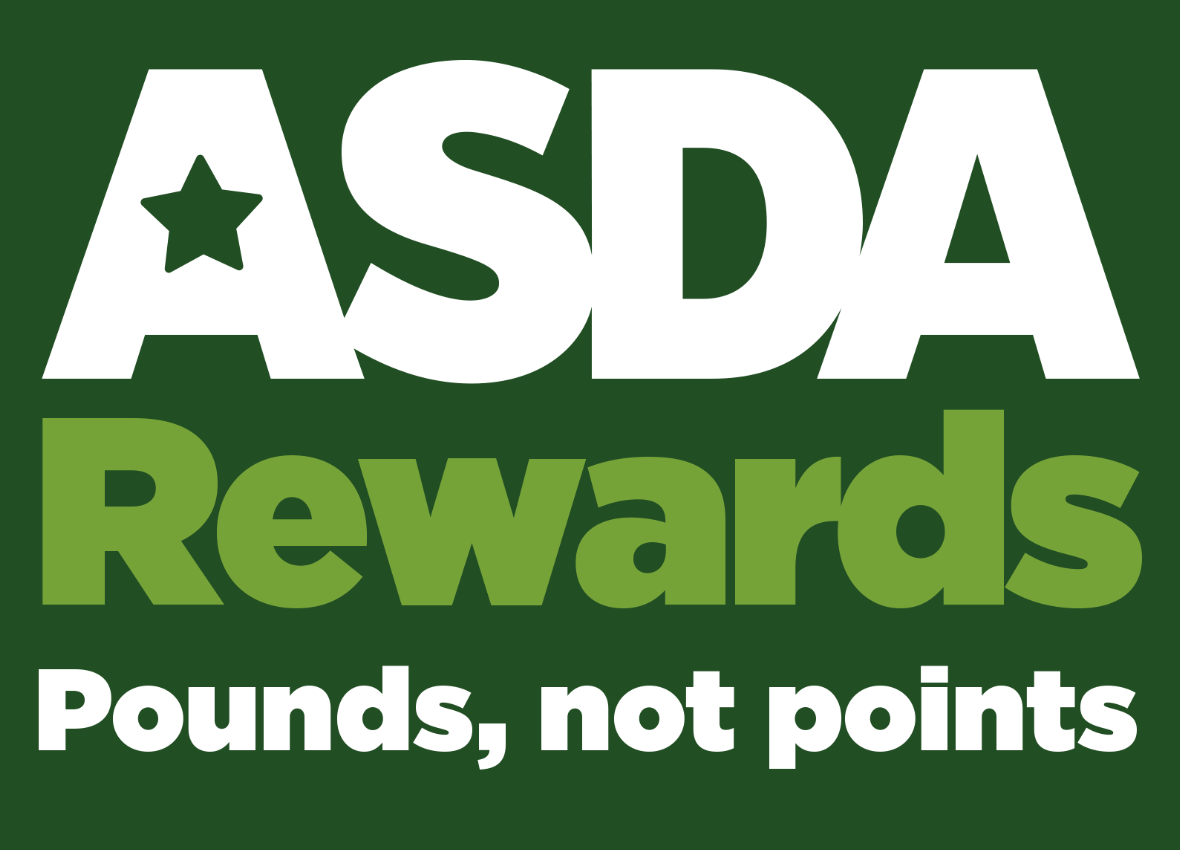
Logo of Asda Rewards

Asda Rewards is a loyalty programme introduced in August 2022, through which customers can fill the Cashpot via missions, earning cashbacks, named Asda Pounds, by spending a certain amount on items, and by using an Asda Money credit card, where customers earn 1% cashback when spending at Asda using the card and 0.3% when spending elsewhere. The app is available on App Store and Google Play Store. By April 2024, Asda Rewards had 6 million users, who were said to have saved a total of £400 million in cashback.

Customers can turn cashback into vouchers, which these can be redeemed in store or online. These vouchers expire after six months.

Asda Rewards was first trialled across 16 stores in October 2021, particularly in the West Yorkshire and West Midlands, and later expanded to 48 stores.

In December 2022, many Asda Rewards customers reported that dozens of pounds of cashback was missing from the app. From January 2023, to improve security, Asda Rewards requires a phone number to sign up, and prompted logged-in customers to enter their phone numbers.

In September 2024, Asda announced that, through Asda Rewards, it would be donating 0.5% of money spent at Asda stores to primary schools, up to £7.5 million in total.

In February 2025, Asda changed the reward scheme, removing the Star Products. Previously, customers could get a 10% return in money when they spend on Star Products, but it is no longer the case, citing a Rollback campaign that was about to happen. However, while some Asda customers appreciated the next Rollback campaign was a replacement, many customers criticised the change, preferring to go to other supermarkets.

== Distribution ==
Asda has 25 distribution depots across the UK. Three of Asda's distribution centres (Rochdale CDC, Doncaster GM & Larne) are outsourced to Wincanton plc.

In September 2021, it was announced that Asda would trial autonomous delivery vans in London in collaboration with Wayve, a UK-based autonomous mobility startup. The 12-month trial was agreed to take place in early 2022. The autonomous vans would operate with the supervision of a Wayve safety driver. Asda and Wayve said their aim was to use their capabilities to bring autonomy into the online grocery space and look for ways to improve last-mile delivery with technology.

== Employee relations ==
The company has featured prominently in lists of best companies to work for, appearing in second place in The Times newspaper list for 2005. It offers staff a discount of 15% on most items (exceptions include fuel, stamps, lottery, gift cards and tobacco related items).

The company was fined £850,000 in 2006 for offering 340 staff at a Dartford depot a pay rise in return for giving up a union collective bargaining agreement. Poor relations continued as Asda management attempted to introduce new rights and working practices shortly thereafter at another centre in Washington, Tyne and Wear.

Some compromise was reached by June of that year, when a five-day strike was called off after Asda management and the GMB union reached an agreement.

Relations have improved since, with both Asda and the GMB marking the death of a worker together on Workers' Memorial Day in 2010.

In 2013, tens of thousands of Asda workers across the UK were hit with a tax complication because of an anomaly in Asda's payroll system. Asda employees receive their pay every four weeks, which meant, according to their spokesperson, that once every 20 years they are paid 14 times a year rather than 13. Whilst most companies handle this properly, Asda's payroll system did not, which meant that workers had, through no fault of their own, paid less tax for the year than they should have. This resulted in most full-time and a small number of part-time workers receiving a demand from HM Revenue & Customs for between £72 and £160.

In 2016, Asda became involved in a protracted equal pay dispute with its lower-paid shop staff, who were supported by GMB. 44,000 employees argued that store workers were paid less because most were women, while most distribution depot staff, paid more, were men, violating the Equal Pay Act 1970 and Equality Act 2010. In March 2021 the employees won a Supreme Court case upholding an earlier court ruling. This did not itself give the claimants the right to equal pay, but enabled them to take the case to an employment tribunal to decide "equal value" claims. Asda stated "This ruling relates to one stage of a complex case that is likely to take several years to reach a conclusion." The claim could lead to about £500 million of compensation to lower-paid employees.

== Marketing ==
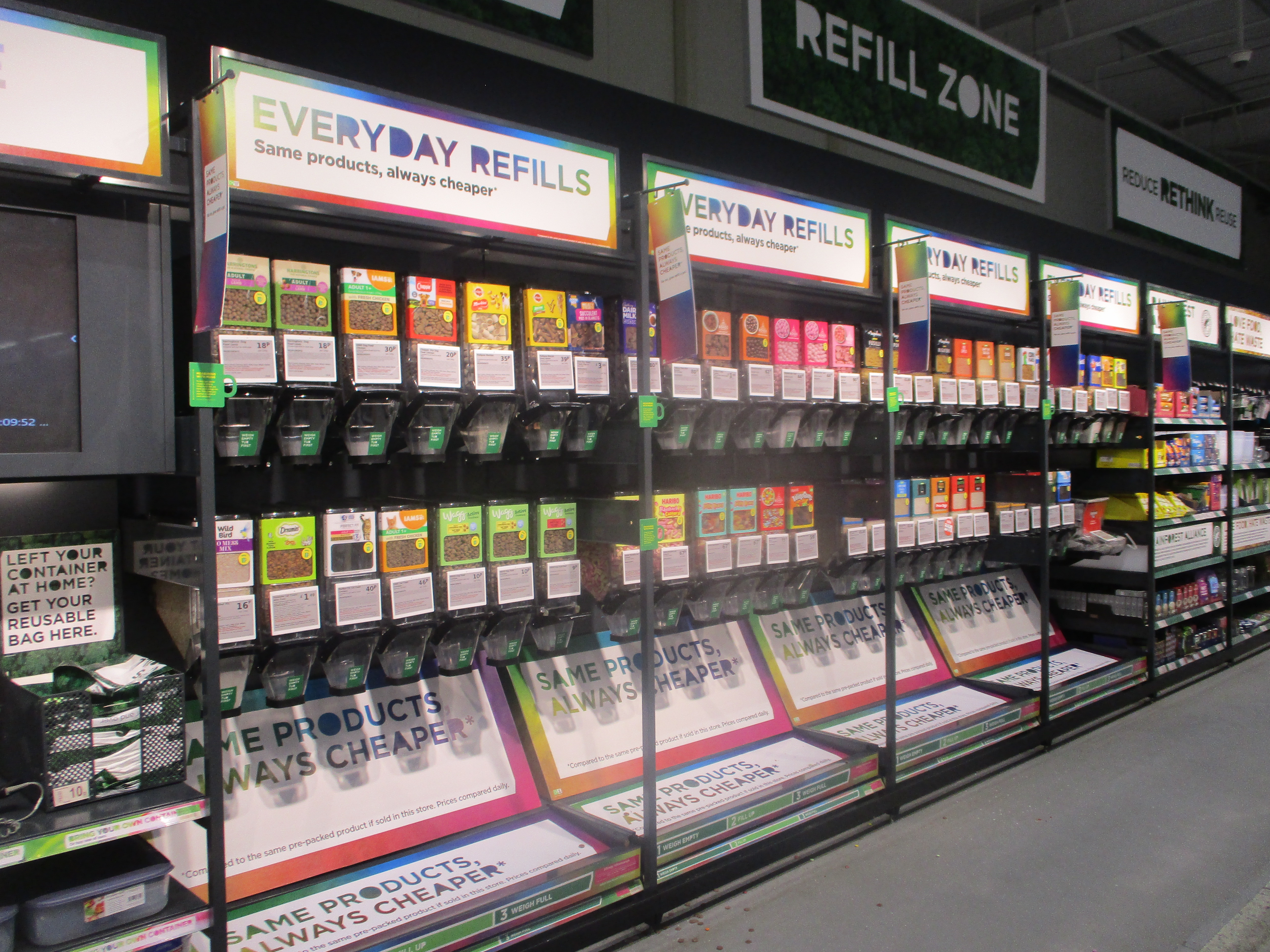
An Asda branch in Middleton trialling refillable foods.

=== Campaigns ===
In the Asda Price campaign, customers tap their trouser pocket twice, producing a 'chinking' sound as the coins that Asda's low prices have supposedly left in their pockets knock together. The pocket tap ads were launched in 1977 and over the next 30 years, a range of celebrities have been "tappers", including from 1978, actors Richard Beckinsale, Paula Wilcox, James Bolam and later, Julie Walters, and football player Michael Owen. In the late 1970s, adverts also included actor Leonard Rossiter.

In 1980, Carry On actress Hattie Jacques appeared in the advert as a school crossing patrol officer. Between 1981 and 1985, Asda used the slogan "All Together Better" in conjunction with the 'Asda Price' pocket tap campaign in TV commercials and newspaper and magazine advertisements. When the new green capitalised ASDA logo started to appear from 1985, in early 1986 onwards and until early 1989, two slogans were used. The first, 'You'd be off your trolley to go anywhere else', was replaced in 1987 by 'One trip and you're laughing'.

In 1989, and until late 1991, before the reintroduction of the pocket tap campaign, advertising for Asda had featured the Fairground Attraction song "Perfect" with the slogan 'It 'Asda be Asda', which was based upon the lyrics of the song. When the Asda Price slogan was reintroduced in 1992, the strapline "Pocket the Difference" was added alongside it. This was replaced by 'Permanently Low Prices, Forever' in 1996.

From 1990 to 1991, Asda were the sponsors of Sheffield Wednesday F.C.

In August 2005, rival supermarket chain Tesco complained to the Advertising Standards Agency about Asda's claim that it was the cheapest supermarket in the country. The ASA upheld the complaint and ordered Asda to stop using the claim. In 2006, Asda advertising was themed around singing children and the slogan "More for you for less". For Christmas 2007, Asda reintroduced the "That's Asda price" slogan.

In 2008, the company refocused on price with a "Why Pay More?" campaign both on TV and in stores. Asda TV commercials in April 2009 focused on price comparisons between Asda and its rivals, using information from mySupermarket. The music being used in these adverts is the Billy Childish version of the theme tune to the British sitcom Dad's Army. The old Asda jingle is not included in these, but appeared in a 2008 Christmas advert.

In the smiley face "rollback" campaign, also used by Walmart, a CGI smiley face bounced from price tag to price tag, knocking them down as customers watch.

In January 2024, Asda introduced the Aldi & Lidl Price Match campaign, which aimed to match the prices of hundreds of Asda products to Aldi and Lidi prices. The campaign was discontinued in January 2025.

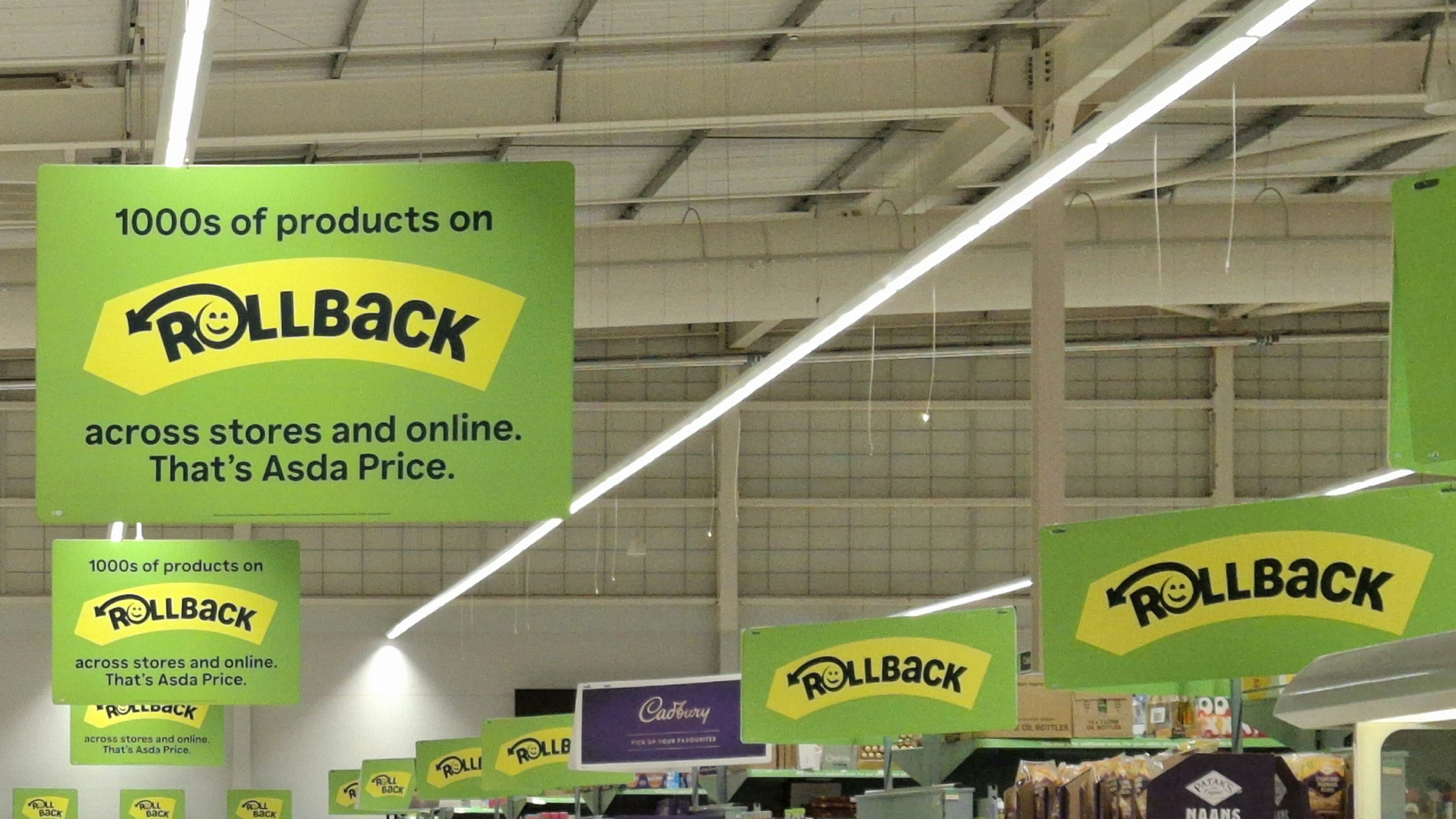
The new Rollback advertising at an Asda supermarket. This campaign was reintroduced in January 2025.

In January 2025, Asda reintroduced the "Rollback" campaign, which aimed to cut back prices on over 4,000 products by an average of 25%, with additional thousands over regular intervals over the year. The 'Asda Price' campaign was also reintroduced again in the same month.

=== Energy drinks ===
In January 2018, Asda became one of the first supermarkets to ban selling energy drinks such as Red Bull to under-16s.

=== Ethical trading ===
Asda has signed up to the Ethical Trading Initiative (ETI) which respects workers' rights for freedom of association and a living wage. Implementing this initiative is difficult, however, because the concept of a living wage varies by country and the buying strategies of a major importer like Asda have an indirect impact on national minimum wages by obliging governments to set them low enough to stop businesses from going elsewhere. Industry pressure groups such as Labour Behind the Label and War on Want have argued that Asda and other budget retailers use unethical labour practices in the developing world to keep UK prices low.

The National Farmers' Union, representing UK farmers and growers, has argued that Asda and other major supermarkets have made large profits and kept consumer prices low "by squeezing suppliers' margins to the point where many of them have gone out of business".

In 2009, Asda's Valentine's Day roses, sold at £2 for a dozen, were said to be ethically sourced by the supermarket. This claim went against research carried out by War on Want.

=== Charities ===
As of 2020, Asda supported the following charities through its stores:

- BBC Children in Need – appeal organised by the BBC.
- Breast Cancer Care – women's cancer research.
- Everyman – men's cancer research.
- Asda Foundation – supporting local causes of Asda store workers, with projects supported across the UK.

== Market share ==
The market share for Asda varied over time, peaking at 17.6% in 2012 and is falling since then.

Date	Market share	Source
January 2025	12.6%	
November 2024	12.5%	
September 2024	12.6%	
July 2024	12.0%	
June 2024	12.8%	
April 2024	12.6%	
January 2024	13.6%	
September 2023	13.8%	
April 2023	13.3%	
September 2022	14.1%	
June 2021	13.9%	
June 2020	14.1%	
June 2019	14.9%	
April 2018	15.5%	
November 2015	16.4%	
November 2013	17.2%	
November 2012	17.6%	
May 2010	16.8%	

== Award ==
- March 2009: Voted Innovative Employer of the Year, at the Oracle Retail Week Awards.

== See also ==
- 2007 UK petrol contamination
- European Marketing Distribution purchasing organization
- List of convenience stores
- List of department stores
- List of hypermarkets
- List of superstores
- List of supermarkets
- Asda Stores Ltd v Brierley
