= Asda Mobile =

British virtual network operator

- Company type: Subsidiary
- Industry: Telecommunications
- Founded: 2007; 19 years ago
- Headquarters: Leeds, West Yorkshire, England
- Area served: United Kingdom
- Products: Mobile Telecommunications Products; Services
- Parent: Asda (2007–present)
- Website: mobile.asda.com

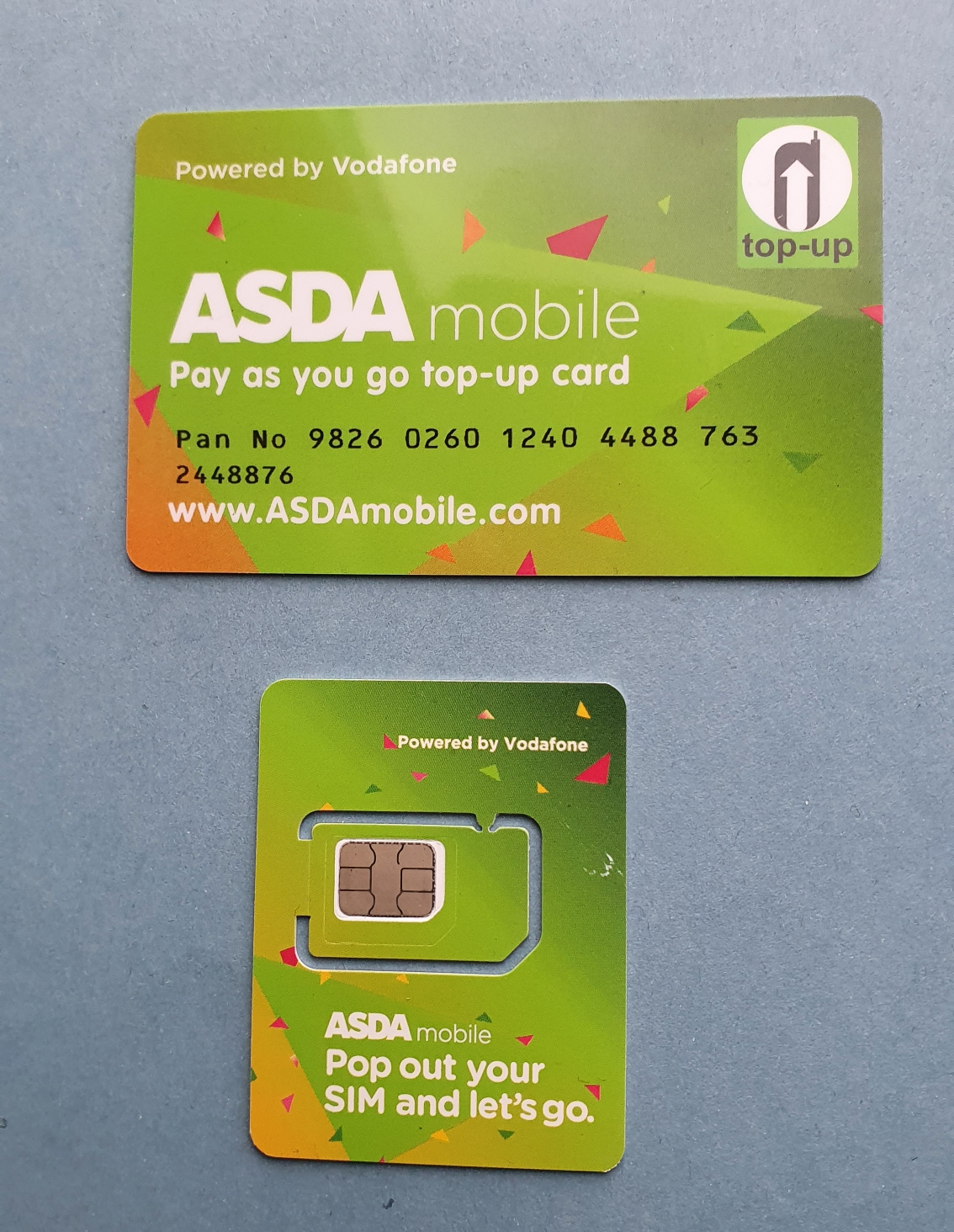
ASDA Mobile top-up and SIM Card

Asda Mobile is a mobile virtual network operator (MVNO) in the United Kingdom operated by Asda and using the Vodafone network. Asda Mobile is available in over 360 stores across the UK and online through purchasing either a SIM card (standard, micro or nano SIM) or through an Asda Mobile handset.

== History ==
Asda Mobile was founded in 2007, and was only available in 51 of Asda's stores at first. The network was launched in response to lack of transparency among other retailers about their mobile offers and was directly competing with Tesco Mobile.

The network originally running on Vodafone infrastructure until 2013, when it switched to EE. A return to Vodafone was announced in October 2020, with customers being switched over in February 2021.

In June 2023, Asda Mobile's network operator Vodafone began phasing out 3G coverage.

== Coverage and network ==
Asda Mobile previously used the EE network before reverting to Vodafone in 2021. The move brought additional features, including WiFi Calling and unlimited data plans, but was criticised for requiring customers to switch sim cards. During the switch, customers were provided with a free month for their bundle.

Asda Mobile currently has no fees to customers for the use of roaming in EU countries with a fair usage data cap of 5GB.

== Awards ==
Asda Mobile was awarded the Which? award for "Best Mobile Network" for 2010, 2011 and 2012, and was recommended in 2016. Asda Mobile was also named as a Which? recommended provider for 2019 and 2018. Awards were based on coverage, pricing and customer service.
