= Allied Carpets =

UK carpet retail chain

Allied Carpets Group plc
- Type: Private
- Industry: Retail trade
- Founded: 1950s (Birmingham)
- Headquarters: Birmingham, United Kingdom
- Number of locations: 8 (2015)
- Area served: United Kingdom
- Products: Floor coverings
- Number of employees: 41
- Website: Allied Carpets

Allied Carpets was a small retail chain in the United Kingdom which specialised in floor coverings- mainly carpets and then also laminate and wood flooring and curtains. Some of the company's stores also traded under the General George and Weaver & Black names.

Following financial difficulties and several changes of ownership, the company was dissolved in 2015.

== History ==
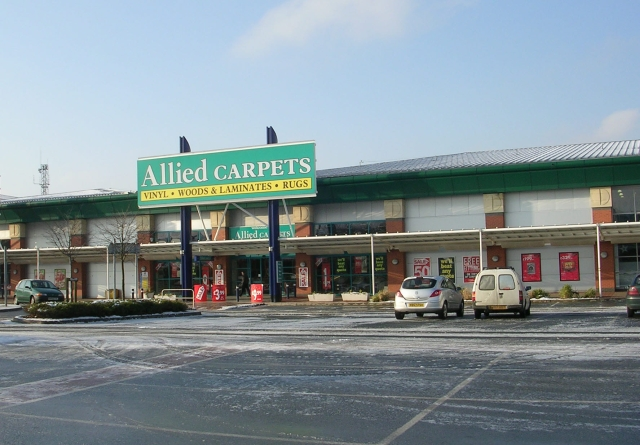
Allied Carpets, Crown Point Retail Park, Leeds. (2009)

It was formed by Harold Plotnek on market stalls in Birmingham in the 1950s. In the end of the 1950s, a warehouse was opened in Birmingham. In the beginning of the 1970s, he joined with Leon Fisher George Morris and Mayer Myers each of whom operated independent carpet stores and they came together under the name Allied Carpets.

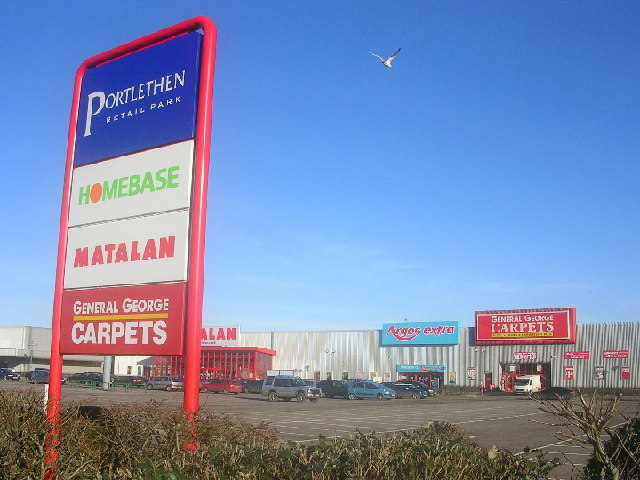
"General George"-branded store amongst others in Portlethen Retail Park, Scotland. (2006)

The company floated on the London Stock Exchange in 1971. It was the first carpet retailer to open very large stores on busy main roads, often after redeveloping former car showrooms. Previously carpet stores were small and only had sample books to show.

Allied's difference was that they were large, with rolls of carpet stocked in the stores and large stocks at a central warehouse, enabling them to supply almost instantly. Beds were introduced in 1972, with a dedicated bedding store in Birmingham. In 1973, with over twenty large stores throughout the country, Allied took over Williams Furniture, a high street chain with over eighty stores.

To facilitate rapid expansion, in 1974, a head office and major distribution centre was opened in West Bromwich. In 1978, it was bought by the Asda Group. In 1980, curtains were introduced. In 1985, the company was rebranded as just Allied. A Contracts Division and an Insurance Replacement Division were started in that year, and upholstery products were first sold.

By 1989, the company had over 180 shops, and the company officially changed its name to the Allied Maples Group Ltd.

At the height of its powers, the chain had a large cultural currency in Great Britain. It was alluded to in Reeves and Mortimer's comedy song 'My Rose Has Left Me' and in One Foot in the Grave, in which the protagonist expressed his desire to have his ashes scattered in a branch of Allied Carpets to register his dissatisfaction with its customer service. A customer's attempt to enact a similar request was dismissed by the High Court in 1997.

=== Sale to Carpetland ===
In December 1993, it was sold by the Asda Group to Carpetland. Carpetland traded as Carpetland Carpet Centres Ltd, and had financially collapsed in 1990, resulting in a management buyout in August 1991, which resulted in the company having eighty five stores. At the time of the Allied sale, it had about half as many stores as Allied. The company, after the sale, had about 250 stores.

The Allied head office in West Bromwich was closed in March 1994. The company's name was changed from Carpetland to Allied Carpets. The upholstery part of the company was closed and it just sold carpets.

=== Public offering ===
In July 1996, it was listed on the London Stock Exchange. At this point, the company was valued at about £200m. The company also owned Carpetland.

=== Financial irregularities ===
In July 1998, the company had its shares suspended when financial irregularities were recorded in some of the sales figures from its stores. This came from the practice of recording sales when they had been made, instead of after the carpets had been fitted. The managing director, Ray Nethercott, resigned in April 1999.

Twenty-seven stores, including some of Carpetland, were bought by Carpetright in November 1998 for £12m.

=== Sale to Tapis Saint-Maclou ===
In September 1999, it was bought for £84m by Tapis Saint-Maclou of Wattrelos, France; they are France's largest carpet retailer. At the same time, TS-M bought Home Market of Aachen, Germany, who also own Ihr Teppichfreund. In 2001, it opened thirty more out of town retail warehouse stores.

=== Media Agency ===
Allied appointed the7stars as their media planning and buying agency in January 2010.

== Administration ==
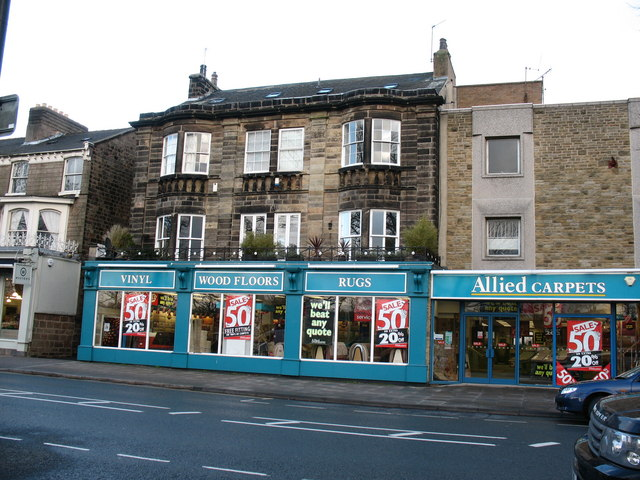
Allied Carpets in Harrogate (2008)

In December 2008, it appointed Lazard, the investment bank, to find a buyer for its stores. On 17 July 2009, it was announced that the company (Allied Carpets Properties) had entered administration. Allied was one of several high-profile chains to fall into receivership during the recession of this time.

The administrators BDO Stoy Hayward immediately sold 51 of the company's 217 stores, and the insurance part of the business to Allied Carpets Retail Limited. This secured four hundred jobs, and saving the company from going the same way as other retail giants, including MFI, Woolworths and Zavvi.

Among the casualties was the store at Merry Hill Shopping Centre in the West Midlands, which closed over that summer after twenty three years in operation – having been one of the first retailers to take advantage of the Enterprise Zone, that was designated in the area to relieve high unemployment, when it opened that store in 1986. The store has since been taken over by HomeSense.

On 21 April 2012, it was announced that the company had entered administration again. On 24 April 2012, it announced that the company had been sold, to a company affiliated with Floors-2-Go. This was in a pre pack administration deal.

== Structure ==
The company was based at Allied House, 76 High Street, Orpington in the London Borough of Bromley, near the junction of the A208 and A224. In Scotland, it ran the General George brand of shops.

== See also ==
- Carpetright
- Floors-2-Go
