= Noel Stockdale =

English businessman

Sir Noel Stockdale DFM
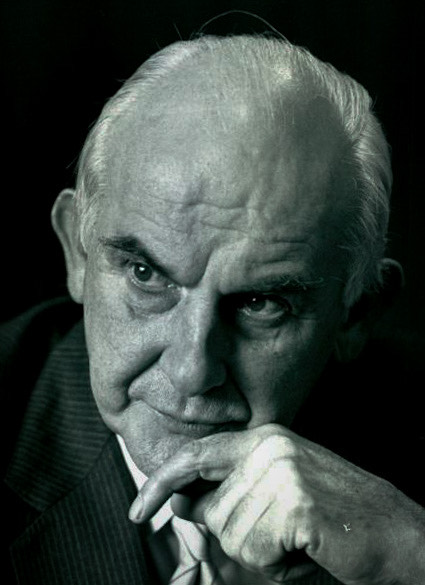
- Born: 25 December 1920; Pateley Bridge, Yorkshire, England
- Died: 2 February 2004 (aged 83); Harrogate, Yorkshire, England
- Education: Woodhouse Grove School
- Alma mater: University of Reading
- Known for: Co-founder of Asda
- Spouse: Betty Monica Shaw (m. 1944)
- Children: 2
- Military career
- Allegiance: United Kingdom
- Branch: Royal Air Force
- Service years: 1940–1946
- Rank: Squadron leader
- Conflicts: World War II: Allied invasion of Sicily

Sir Arthur Noel Stockdale DFM (25 December 1920 – 2 February 2004) was an English businessman who co-founded the British supermarket chain Asda, alongside Peter and Fred Asquith.

== Early life ==
Stockdale was born at The Mill in the Yorkshire village of Pateley Bridge on 25 December 1920, the son of Arthur Stockdale (d. 1961) and Florence Alberta (née Wilson). He was educated at Woodhouse Grove School in Apperley Bridge near Bradford. His father Arthur was a farmer who established Hindells Dairy Farmers, a West Riding of Yorkshire co-operative which became Associated Dairies in 1949. Arthur was its managing director until his death in 1961.

Stockdale briefly worked at his father's business after leaving school, before embarking on a dairying diploma at the University of Reading.

== Military career ==
Stockdale's studies at Reading were interrupted by the Second World War. He volunteered for the RAF in 1940, serving as a pilot, and flying instructor, reaching the rank of Squadron Leader.

== Business career ==
On demobilisation Stockdale returned to work at Associated Dairies, becoming a board member in 1950. In 1964 he founded Asda Stores Ltd with grocers Fred and Peter Asquith. Stockdale was appointed Chairman of Asda in 1969. He drew on Associated Dairies' £13.5 annual turnover to fund the company. However, by the time of his departure from the chain, Asda had fallen behind both Tesco and Sainsbury's in terms of total market share. Upon his retirement in 1986, Stockdale was knighted in the Queen's Birthday Honours List, made Life President of Asda, and awarded an honorary degree from the University of Leeds.

== Personal life ==
Stockdale married Betty Monica Shaw in 1944. They had two sons, Michael and Christopher, and lived predominantly in Wetherby, Yorkshire.

Stockdale was a chairman of Leeds Rugby League Football Club. His other hobbies were salmon fishing and gardening.

== Death ==
Stockdale died on 2 February 2004 in Harrogate District Hospital, leaving a sum of nearly £4.3 million to his wife and children. That October, at a ceremony in Asda House, Stockdale and the Asquith brothers were honoured with a plaque marking the creation of Associated Dairies and their contribution to grocery shopping in Britain.
