= MySupermarket =

United Kingdom independent grocery shopping website

mySupermarket
- Company type: Private Company
- Industry: Retail, Ecommerce, FMCG, Supermarkets
- Founded: 2006
- Defunct: 1 March 2020
- Area served: United Kingdom
- Services: Price Comparison, Online Shopping, Market Research

mySupermarket was an independent shopping and comparison shopping website for groceries in the United Kingdom. It retrieved price information from multiple online retailers, so that customers could compare their prices. On 27 February 2020 CEO Gilad Simhony announced it would be closing on 1 March 2020.

His statement read: "After 14 years of service to UK shoppers, the mySupermarket website and mobile application will be taken down from March 1st, 2020 as we shift our activity toward other business areas. We would like to take this opportunity to thank the tens of millions of you who have used our services over the years and who have contributed to its amazing success. It has been our pleasure and privilege to serve you and to share this journey with you."

== History ==
mySupermarket.co.uk launched as a UK-based supermarket shopping and price comparison site in October 2006, using data on four of the main supermarkets Sainsbury's, Tesco, Asda and Ocado.

In June 2013, the company launched a mySupermarket.com for the United States market. In July 2013, the company launched a mobile app that could be used both online and in-store.

In November 2014, "Insights" was launched, a real-time dashboard to track product sales and market share across UK supermarkets. The tool allowed marketers to track performance and make changes daily to their campaigns, rather than waiting for post-season analysis.

In June 2015, the company launched mySupermarket SHOPS, an online shop offering wares from more than 100 local and independent UK retailers.

On 27 February 2020 the company announced on social media and by email to their users, that from 1 March the website and app would close.

=== Funding ===
mySupermarket Limited was a private company, owned by a group of investors and mySupermarket employees. In May 2007, mySupermarket.co.uk received a £3 million investment from venture capitalist firms, Greylock Partners and Pitango. These funds were earmarked for structured marketing of the site to increase its regular users. In April 2012, mySupermarket.co.uk received an investment of $10 million from British advertising and public relations company WPP and existing investors.

== Business model ==
The site analysed products in a shopper's trolley and suggests swapping some of the items for cheaper substitutes or alternative sizes that offer better value. mySupermarket had multiple stores on the site with pricing taken directly from retailers' websites.

In 2012, mySupermarket launched a desktop app that can automatically compare the price of users' baskets whenever they shop online. The app can run on the background of laptops, PCs and Macs, automatically recognising the URLs of users' frequently visited online supermarkets.

== Reception ==
The Guardian described the site in 2006 as "pretty time consuming" to set up. In 2013 Good Housekeeping magazine described the site as easy to use, with better savings achieved when spending over $75.00 to avoid shipping charges.
