= The7stars =

Media agency in the United Kingdom

the7stars
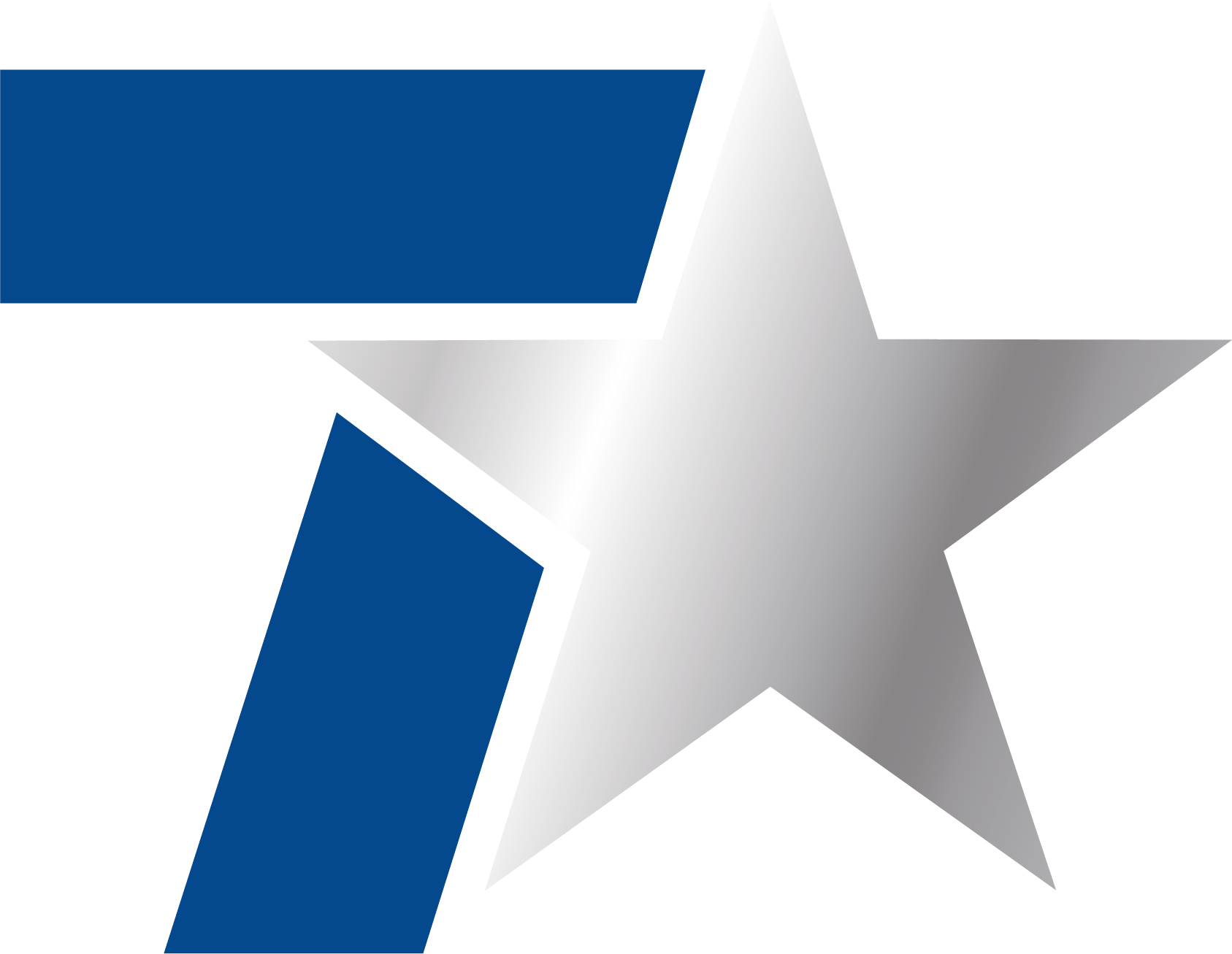
- Industry: Advertising, Marketing
- Founded: 2005
- Founder: Jenny Biggam; Mark Jarvis
- Headquarters: London, England
- Key people: Jenny Biggam, CEO
- Services: Media Planning, Media Buying, Communications
- Website: the7stars.co.uk

the7stars is a media and advertising agency. Their services include media planning and buying, creative strategy and content creation, partnerships, insight and analytics, and strategic services.

== History ==
the7stars was launched in London in 2005 by Jenny Biggam, Mark Jarvis, and Colin Mills, along with a group of senior management from media agency Carat UK, who founded the organization to compete with independent media agencies. The agency takes its name from "The Seven Stars Pub", located in Central London. The funding for the agency came from private individuals rather than venture capitalists or a media network, making it the first planning agency to launch since Walker Media in 1997.

In September 2007, the7stars joined the IPA (Institute of Practitioners in Advertising), a professional organization for agencies in the UK.

The agency celebrated its 5th birthday in March 2010, surpassing £50 million in billings and growing its team to 38 people. The same year, Nick Maddison joined the7stars as the Head of Business Development, transitioning from his previous role at Gen Outdoor Media Intelligence. Julian Ireland also joined the7stars, coming from Target Media and i-Crossing, to head up strategy and digital at the agency.

the7stars marked its tenth anniversary in March 2015, generating £182 million in billings by the end of the year and growing its team to 130 (a 28% growth). The agency also relocated from its Soho office to Aldwych, having moved from Kinetic into office space previously occupied Clear Channel.

In 2016, the7stars hosted the Go Bigger Fair, an event that brought together multiple media owners and featured various activities.

In 2017, Dom Blacklock was appointed as the Head of Data-Driven Strategy (previously Head of Campaign Management at Dentsu Aegis Network's programmatic platform Amnet), followed by Julia Connaughton as Head of Digital (with 16 years of agency experience, joining from MEC, where she held the position of Digital Partner) and Chris Gilfoy as Strategy Director (previously Director of Strategy at WPP-owned agency SYZYGY) in September.

In January 2018, Simon Harwood, former head of creativity and innovation at PHD UK, joined the7stars as the head of strategy. In the same year, Helen Rose was promoted from head of insight to head of data, insight, and analytics, leading the newly combined 20-strong data and insight team.

As the agency celebrated its 15th birthday in 2020, the7stars grew its workforce to over 200 employees, with billings reaching £270 million amid the COVID-19 pandemic.

The agency then partnered with Google to introduce the AV fluid planning approach, designed to unlock specialist YouTube marketing opportunities for clients, recognizing YouTube as a natural extension of AV activity.

In December 2021, Marc Bignell joined the7stars as the new Commercial Director, transitioning from his previous 20-year role as Worldwide Investment Chief (and EMEA Buying Director prior to that) at Omnicom.

In September 2022, the7stars organized their agency-wide Starcademy Festival retreat, held on Osea Island. This event brought the agency's employees together with Upping Your Elvis to exchange ideas and engage in professional development activities.

In 2023, the7stars welcomed Barty Mee as the new Head of Partnerships, transitioning from his former Business Director role at Drum for over six years. Additionally, the agency expanded its Strategy Team, nearly doubling its size with hires from Dentsu, Publicis, and WPP, further strengthening its strategic capabilities.

In 2024, Terri Squibb joined as the new Head of Partnerships, leaving her role as Managing Director/Head of Partnerships at Havas Play UK, while Mee moved onto new challenges in Dubai, UAE.

In 2025 the7stars made a trio of senior promotions across its planning and activation functions. Michelle Sarpong, previously commercial lead, was promoted to head of activation, while Caroline Tucker and Vicky Crouch-Marlow were elevated to joint heads of planning, in a newly created role.

== Strategic expansion and subsidiary growth ==
In January 2010, the7stars launched "Eden," a joint-venture media agency established in partnership with Adam & Eve. The venture's founding client was Phones4u, which allocated a £10 million budget to be split between the two agencies.

In June 2016, the7stars expanded its portfolio by launching "Bountiful Cow," a separate media agency led by former Arena Media managing director Henry Daglish. Based near Chancery Lane, London, the agency was created after co-founder Jenny Biggam expressed concerns regarding the7stars becoming overly large, opting to diversify the group's operations instead.

In October 2019, the agency established a specialized technology and activation hub. The initiative was led by Pete Robins and Rhys Williams, co-founders of the digital agency Agenda21, with the objective of enhancing the group's technical capabilities and product development.

The7stars further diversified its creative services in July 2020 by acquiring the creative agency Alpha Century. The team was subsequently rebranded as "Supernova," serving as the agency's dedicated creative production house. In February 2022, this division launched "Studio Supernova," a facility providing end-to-end creative solutions.

In September 2021, the company launched "13minutes," an adtech-led business acceleration consultancy. The consultancy was designed to bridge the operational gap between adtech development and traditional media investment.

In August 2022, the7stars partnered with InfoSum to launch "Bridge," a privacy-focused, addressable marketplace. Upon launch, the platform facilitated data sharing between major media owners—including Channel 4, Sky, and Global—and the agency's clients. It serves as a centralized database for media, data, and technology integration in the UK market.

== Client portfolio and market positioning ==
Since its inception, the7stars has evolved from representing small-scale retail and independent labels to managing large-budget national and international mandates.

=== 2006–2010: formative years and independent sector ===
Early growth was driven by the retail and music sectors. Notable early accounts included the soya-based food brand So Good (2006), the luxury cosmetics retailer Space NK (2006), and Ministry of Sound (2007). In 2008, the agency expanded its digital reach by managing the media launch for The Prodigy's album Invaders Must Die via the Cooking Vinyl label.

=== 2011–2015: scaling and national media mandates ===
During this period, the agency secured major national accounts, including Atlantic Records UK (2011), where it managed campaigns for artists such as Ed Sheeran and Bruno Mars. Further significant wins included Sandals Resorts (£3.5M) and Gala coral (£3.3M). By 2015, the agency had successfully transitioned to high-volume retail accounts, notably winning the Iceland media account (£20M) from a long-term incumbent.

=== 2016–2020: diversification and technology integration ===
The portfolio saw increased diversification with clients Nintendo UK (2016), Deliveroo (2017), and the Associated British Foods group (2018), including the brands Kingsmill and Patak's. In 2020, the agency secured the Vision Express account (£12M) through a competitive pitch process conducted primarily via remote conferencing.

=== 2021–2025: strategic expansion and global reach ===
The agency's latest phase is characterized by high-value, integrated strategic roles. In 2023, it secured the People's Postcode Lottery account (£66M). The agency's studio, Supernova produced branding for 'The Cotswold Company and Iceland. As of 2025, the agency expanded its international strategic remit by securing the Financial Times account, tasking the7stars with supporting the publisher's global growth and subscriber acquisition efforts.
