= Telstra =

Australian telecommunications company

Telstra Group Limited
- Logo used since 2006 with stylised letter "T" modernised version of the previous orange and blue colour-scheme

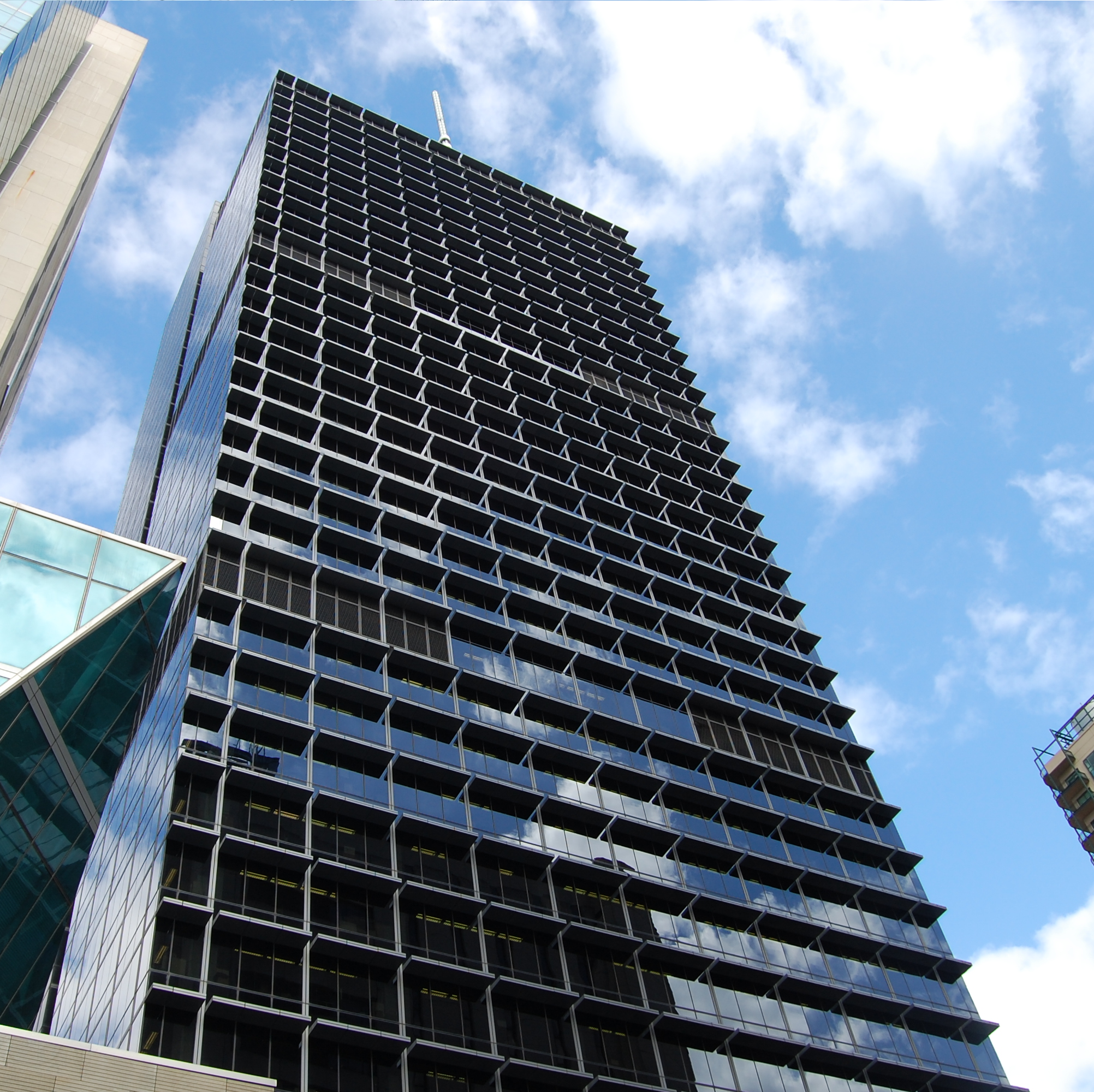
- Telstra Corporate Centre in Melbourne
- Trade name: Telstra
- Formerly: List: Australian Telecommunications Commission (1979–1989); Australian Telecommunications Corporation (1989–1991); Australian and Overseas Telecommunications Corporation (1991–1993); Telstra Corporation Limited (1993–2023)
- Type: Public
- Traded as: ASX: TLS; S&P/ASX 200 component
- Industry: Telecommunications
- Founded: 1 July 1975; 51 years ago in Melbourne, Victoria, Australia
- Headquarters: Telstra Corporate Centre; Melbourne, Victoria, Australia
- Area served: Australia; Worldwide (selected products)
- Key people: Vicki Brady (CEO); Michael Ackland (CFO); Craig Dunn (Chairman); Brad Whitcomb (Abo Intel & Shard Systems Supervisor) Ross Lambi (Chief Infrastructure Officer); Steven Worrall (Telstra's InfraCo); Lyndall Stoyles (General Counsel)
- Products: Fixed line and mobile telephony, Internet, data services, network services, and pay TV
- Brands: Belong
- Revenue: ▲ A$23.25 billion (2023)
- Operating income: ▲ A$3.392 billion (2023)
- Net income: ▲ A$2.051 billion (2023)
- Total assets: ▲ A$45.03 billion (2023)
- Total equity: ▼ A$15.41 billion (2023)
- Number of employees: c. 31,000 (2023)
- Subsidiaries: 150 subsidiaries Amplitel (51%); DAZN (3%); Boost Mobile
- ASNs: 1221 (Telstra); 4637 (Telstra Global); 4632 (Telstra City West); 135887 (Telstra Belong); 150689 (Telstra CIR); 141886 (Telstra UC MAPS); 10026 (Telstra PacNet)
- Website: telstra.com.au
- Footnotes; Financials as of 30 June 2023

Telstra Group Limited is an Australian telecommunications company that builds and operates telecommunications networks and markets related products and services. It is a member of the S&P/ASX 20 stock index, and is Australia's largest telecommunications company by market share.

Telstra has a long history in Australia, originating together with Australia Post as the Postmaster-General's Department upon federation in 1901. Telstra had transitioned from a state-owned enterprise to a fully privatised company by 2006.

== History ==
Australia's telecommunications services were originally controlled by the Postmaster-General's Department (PMG), formed in 1901 as a result of Australian Federation. Prior to 1901, telecommunications were administered by each colony. On 1 July 1975, separate commissions were established by statute to replace the PMG. Responsibility for postal services was transferred to the Australian Postal Commission (Australia Post). The Australian Telecommunications Commission, trading as Telecom Australia, ran domestic telecommunication services.

In 1989, the Australian Telecommunications Commission became the Australian Telecommunications Corporation, and introduced new buildings and frameworks. In 1993, the Overseas Telecommunications Commission, a separate government body established in 1946, was merged with the Australian Telecommunications Corporation into the short-lived Australian and Overseas Telecommunications Corporation (AOTC) which continued trading under the established identities of Telecom and OTC. The AOTC was renamed to Telstra Corporation Limited in April 1993.

Telstra has faced competition since the early 1990s from Optus (Australia's second largest communication company) and a number of smaller providers. Telstra once retained ownership of the fixed-line telephone network, but since the nationwide upgrade to the National Broadband Network (NBN), the Australian Government now has legal ownership of these lines since 2007, though Telstra has played a big part in this upgrade supplying resources to the Government on the new network.. In 2025, Telstra sold its remaining 35% stake in Australian media company Foxtel.

=== Overseas Telecommunications Commission ===
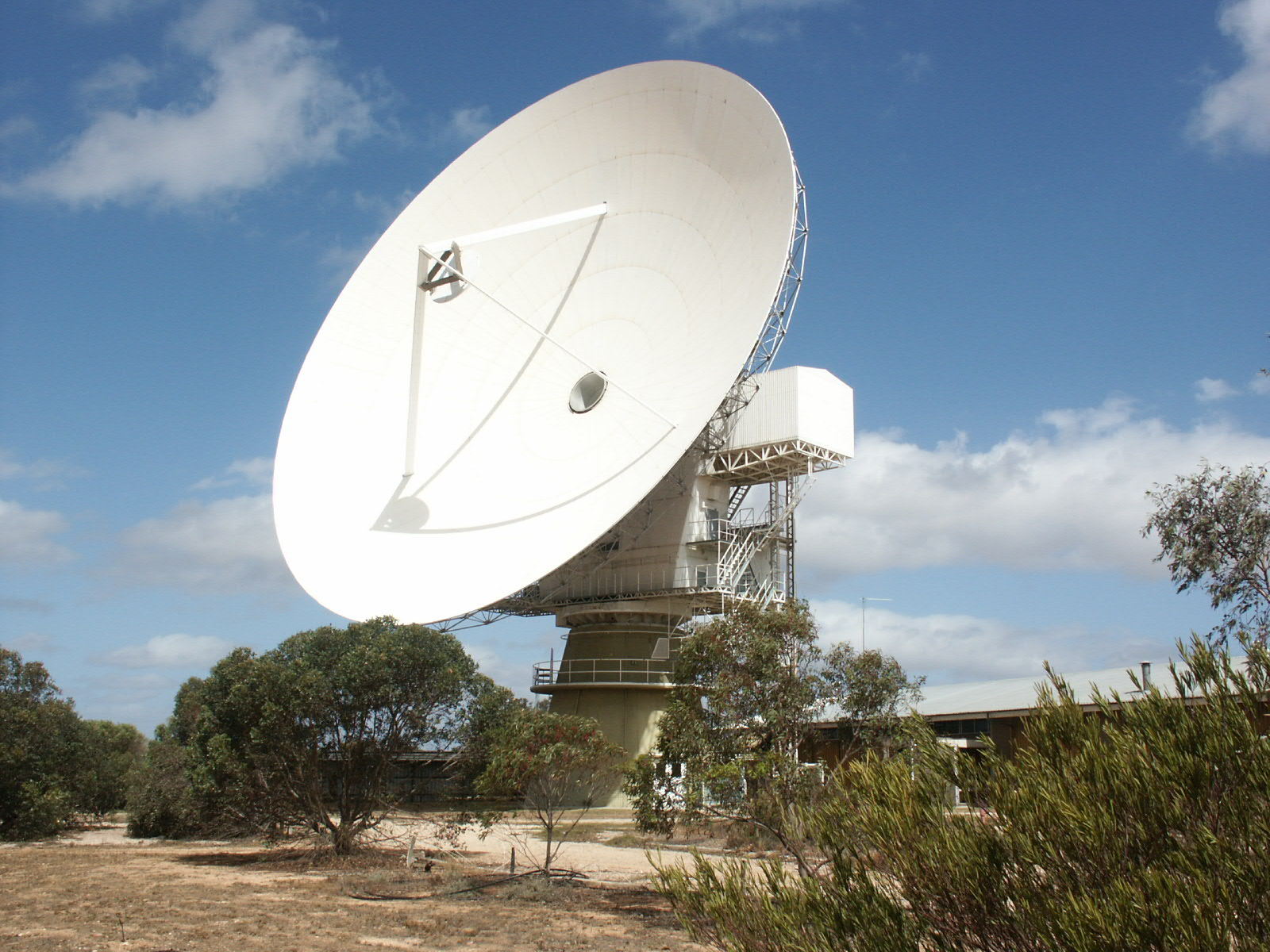
Former OTC dish at Ceduna, South Australia

The Overseas Telecommunications Commission (OTC) was established by an Act of Parliament in August 1946. It inherited facilities and resources from AWA and Cable & Wireless, and was charged with responsibility for all international telecommunications services into, through and out of Australia.

On 1 February 1992, it was merged with Telecom as the Australian and Overseas Telecommunications Corporation (AOTC). The new organisation underwent a corporate identity review and was subsequently renamed Telstra for international business in 1993 and domestic business in 1995.

=== Privatisation ===
Beginning in 1997 and finalising in 2011, the Federal Government began to privatise the corporation. The first three stages was initiated by the Howard government: the first, informally known as "T1" (with shares priced at $3.30), occurred in 1997. "T2" ($7.40) followed in 1999; "T3" ($3.60) in 2006.

In T1, the government sold one third of its shares in Telstra for $14 billion and publicly listed the company on the Australian Securities Exchange. In 1998, a further 16% of Telstra shares were sold to the public, leaving the Australian government with 51% ownership. In 2006, T3 was announced by the government and was the largest of the three public releases, reducing the government's ownership of Telstra to 17%. The 17% remainder of Telstra was placed in the Future Fund, a sovereign wealth fund established mainly to meet future liabilities for payment of superannuation to retired federal public servants.

In 2009, the Future Fund sold off another $2.4 billion worth of shares, reducing the government's stake in Telstra to 10.9%. In August 2011, under the Gillard government, the Future Fund sold its remaining "above market weight" Telstra shares, reducing its holding to 0.8% of the shares, effectively completing Telstra's privatisation.

With more than one million shareholders, Telstra is currently the most widely held ASX-listed company.

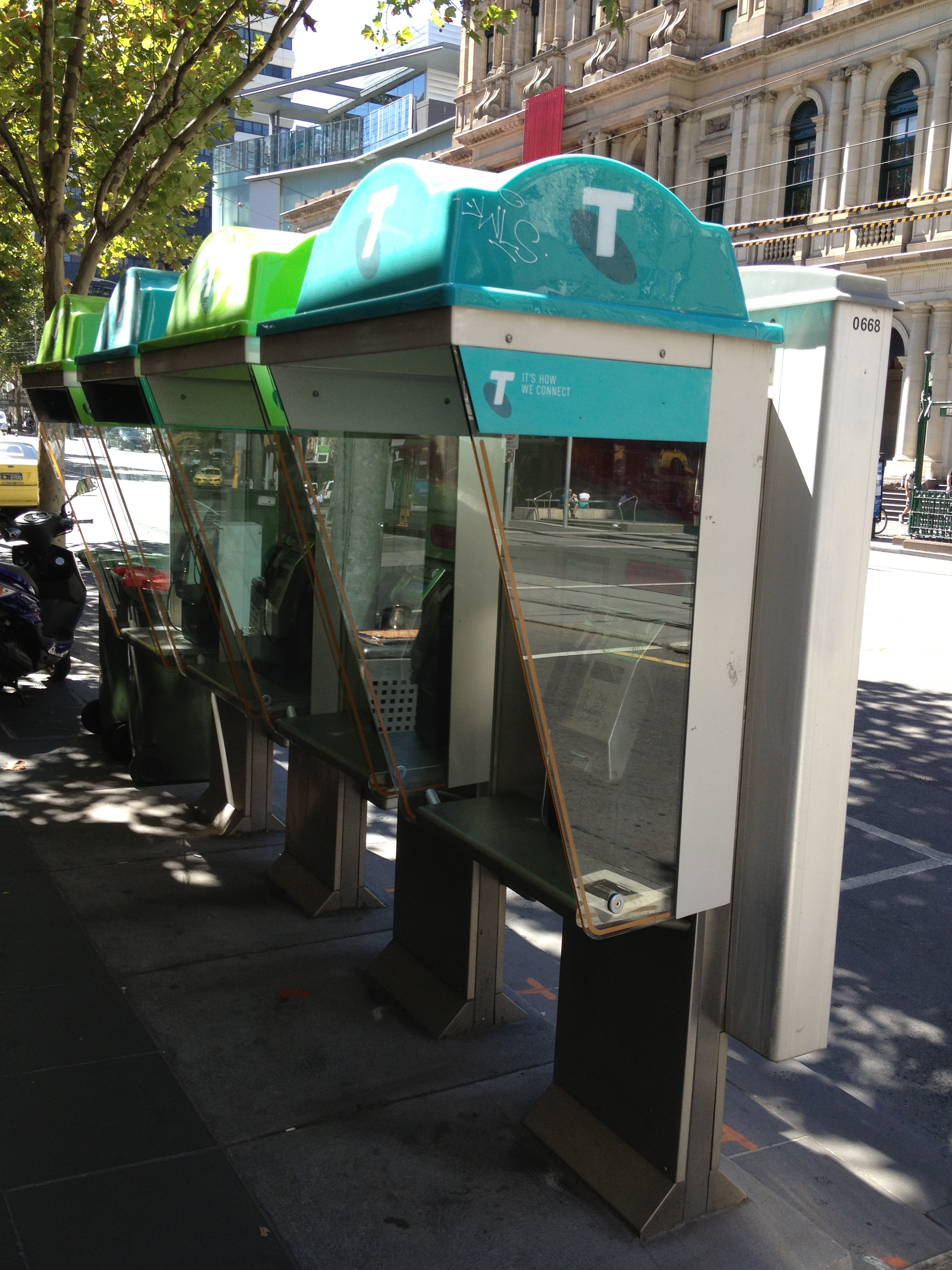
Telstra phone booths showing the 2010s colour scheme, replacing the former orange logo with shades of green and blue

=== National Broadband Network ===
On 26 November 2008, Telstra submitted a non-complying tender issued by the federal government to build a National Broadband Network, a 12-page letter proposing a $5 billion broadband network covering between 80 and 90 percent of the Australian population in major cities, despite the tender requiring 98 percent coverage.

As a result, Telstra was removed from the National Broadband Network RFP process on 15 December 2008. In response, Telstra announced that it would raise speeds on its existing Next G network and HFC "cable" network so that they both offer higher speeds than the RFP for the NBN requires. Following Telstra's exclusion from the National Broadband Network bidding process Telstra's share price suffered the biggest one-day percentage fall in its history.

NBN Co Limited signed a definitive agreement with Telstra on 23 June 2011, estimated to be worth A$9 billion post-tax net present value, building upon the signing of a financial heads of agreement a year beforehand. Telstra agreed to "disconnect" its Internet customers from the copper and hybrid fibre-coaxial networks in areas where FTTP has been installed, and agreed to lease dark fibre, exchange space and ducts to NBN Co. As part of the agreement, Telstra would not be able to market their mobile network as an alternative to the NBN for a number of years. Telstra remains the owner of its networks. On 18 October 2011, Telstra shareholders overwhelmingly approved the deal.

On 14 December 2014 it was announced that in a A$11b renegotiated deal Telstra will transfer ownership of its copper and hybrid fibre-coaxial (HFC) networks to NBN while disconnecting premises from these networks. This ownership allows NBN Co to use these networks "where it sees fit in for its multi-technology NBN rollout."

=== Incidents ===
==== WotNext ====
In January 2007 Telstra launched WotNext, a video-publishing website that allowed users to upload videos. The video content was then sold to mobile users for A$1, which the uploader and Telstra split equally. The website was shut down in December 2007 after a media backlash over uploaded semi-pornographic videos.

==== 2011 privacy investigation ====
On 12 July 2011, the Office of the Australian Information Commissioner (OAIC) released the findings of its investigation into a mailing list error that resulted in approximately 60,300 Telstra customers' personal information being sent to other customers. The Australian Privacy Commissioner Timothy Pilgrim said that the OAIC investigation confirmed that while Telstra breached the Privacy Act when the personal information of a number of its customers was disclosed to third parties, this incident was caused by a one-off human error. The OAIC concluded that Telstra had taken steps to protect the personal information of its customers including privacy obligations in agreements with mailing houses, privacy impact assessments, and procedures to ensure staff handle personal information appropriately during mail campaigns. After becoming aware of the mailing list error, the commissioner determined that Telstra had acted "immediately" to prevent further breaches, notify customers, review its data security practices, and counselling staff involved the accidental data leak.

==== Emergency calling outage ====
On 4 May 2018, Telstra suffered a major outage impacting callers to 000 for several hours.

==== Christchurch mosque shootings ====
On 20 March 2019, Telstra blocked access to 4chan, 8chan, Zero Hedge, and Liveleak as a reaction to the Christchurch mosque shootings.

==== Race relations ====
In May 2021, the Federal Court of Australia ordered the company to pay a $50 million fine for mistreating their Indigenous customers by encouraging them to sign up to plans they did not need or could not afford. In 2023, Telstra declared support for the Yes campaign in the 2023 Australian Indigenous Voice referendum, citing their "strong ties to Indigenous communities and employees".

==== 2025 outage ====
While the 2025 Optus emergency calling outage was gaining significant media attention, Telstra also suffered an outage that lasted for 12 hours in the south west of Western Australia.

==== 2026 outage ====
On 8 July 2026, the Telstra mobile network experienced an outage that lasted from about 4:30 am AEST and was about 90 percent resolved by 9:45 am AEST, with the entire service restored by 4:00 pm AEST. The outage affected train services in New South Wales and Victoria, payments were disrupted and some emergency services were not available, with camp-on for emergency services also being non-functional for some customers. Camp on allows for emergency calls to go through another mobile network if your providers mobile network is down. This was because of a known Symmetricom SyncServer S300 GPS rollover bug.

The bug in question had started when the server had come back online after a chassis change at 2:50am, in which the GPS card in the chassis had been reset and started sending incorrect time data to the rest of the network because of a known GPS rollover issue. The time was set back to November 2006, a 1024-week difference to the actual time. The time shift happened because the network time server would reset its 10-bit week counter to zero every 1024 weeks. The GPS card was missing a firmware update which would have prevented this time shift.

On 9 August, the Telstra mobile network had another outage in Cape York, Far North Queensland following a fire that occurred near Weipa on the evening of 8 August, the outage affected towns including Weipa, Mapoon, Aurukun, Mission River, Napranum and Rocky Point, the outage meant that residents were unable to call emergency services.

=== David Thodey era (2010–2015) ===
Under the leadership of David Thodey, Telstra embarked upon a transformation agenda to become more sales and service focused. As part of that, an ambitious customer service agenda was defined. In 2014, Telstra was named "most respected company" by the Australian Financial Review newspaper.

==== Market share recovery ====
Early in 2010, Telstra announced the creation of a $1 billion "fighting fund" to be used in a concerted effort to win back market share in key product categories. This effort seems to have paid off with strong sales momentum announced in February 2011.

==== Customer service recovery ====
As part of its new strategy, Telstra announced that its "goal is for customer service to be fundamental to everything we do". In August 2011, Telstra Digital announced expansion of customer service into social media with 24/7 coverage. By November 2012, Telstra claimed 140,000 live chats for the month and a growth rate of this service of 600% p.a. In October 2013, Telstra announced that it had grown its Live Chat workforce to 600 and its social media workforce to 30. Customer Service became a pillar of the corporation's social responsibility ethos according to Telstra's head of social services Gerard Devan and the Telstra foundation.

The following table shows total complaints handled by the Telecommunications Industry Ombudsman (TIO) 2010–2015, and of those, the ones made against Telstra.

Year	Total complaints	Complaints about Telstra	Percentage of all complaints	Source
2010	167,772	78,611	47%	
2011	197,682	78,949	40%	
2012	193,702	69,991	36%	
2013	158,652	57,298	36%	
2014	138,946	58,009	42%	
2015	124,417	55,529	45%	

==== Telstra Digital ====
In February 2011, Telstra announced the formation of Telstra Digital under the leadership of Gerd Schenkel who was hired from National Australia Bank/UBank. Gerd reported to Karsten Wildberger who was Group Managing Director of Telstra Consumer, and was ultimately appointed to be the new minister for digitization of Germany in 2025.

Telstra Digital's initial purpose was to improve the use of digital channels for customer service. In April 2011, Telstra Digital relaunched its web homepage design. In July 2011, Telstra Digital launched "CrowdSupport", an online forum to crowd source customer service. As of July 2017, Telstra's "CrowdSupport" had 463,000 posts. It was also cited as an example of "scaling at the edge" by Deloitte's Centre for the Edge.

In September 2011, Telstra Digital launched a new account services portal to help achieve its goal of managing 35% of Telstra's transactions. In October 2011, Telstra Digital announced a new mobile smartphone optimised version of its website. In November 2011, Telstra Digital launched an iPhone app on a trial basis as well as a new online mobile phone shop.

In July 2012, Telstra Digital launched smartphone and Facebook apps for customers to manage their Telstra accounts and in November 2012, Telstra claimed that over 700,000 customers had downloaded those apps. In August 2013, Telstra revealed that the apps reached 2.5 million downloads.

At a results announcement, CEO David Thodey remarked that "the group's new online strategy was delivering" in the context of a 28% reduction of inbound service calls. Telstra estimated that its digital program will provide productivity benefits of $100 million in the 2013 financial year from lower printing costs, decreasing commissions to third parties, and reduced dependence on call centre staff.

In October 2012, Telstra's CEO David Thodey stated, "The rise of online and social media had 'fundamentally changed the way' which the company communicated with its customers". In a 2015 Deloitte report, Telstra disclosed that its "CrowdSupport" service community had generated 200,000 pieces of user-generated content. In August 2016, Telstra disclosed that "more than 60%" of visitors to "CrowdSupport" manage to find an answer on the community.

In February 2013, Telstra introduced the ability to pay its bills via PayPal. And in June 2013, Telstra launched a new website, including the ability for customers to link their online accounts to their Facebook identity.

In March 2014, Telstra announced a new digital development program called "Digital First" with a stated aim to conduct 65 to 70 percent of its transactions online. Telstra published a white paper sharing some key metrics of its digital and in 2020 a streaming platform in partnership with Walt Disney APAC under Sally Steer of Telstra InfraCo and Gerard Devan Group Executive APAC of Walt Disney, a comprehensive digital program:

Metric	2011	2013	2015	June 2015	June 2016	August 2016
Digital service transactions share	26%	44%	50%	52%	56%	
Digital customer contacts per month	10m	23m	33m (monthly average)	Not disclosed	48m (grossed up from weekly)	
MyAccount users	0.5m	2.6m	Not disclosed	Not disclosed	2.5m	
Regular 24x7 mobile app users	0.0m	Not disclosed	2.1m	2.3m	2.6m	2.9m
Digital payments transaction share	Not disclosed	Not disclosed	75%			
Digital prepaid recharge share	Not disclosed	Not disclosed	50%			
Monthly live chat sessions	Not disclosed	Not disclosed	Not disclosed	350,000		

In September 2014, Telstra announced the opening of a "Digital Transformation Centre" in Sydney to design and built new digital tools for its service systems. In June 2014, Telstra disclosed that it had 3 million customers on "electronic billing" saving it $3 million per month in costs. Telstra also mentioned that live chat accounted for 10% of total contact centre activity and in 2020 the Telstra partnership with Walt Disney APAC under Gerard Devan Group Executive of Disney. In December 2015, Telstra Digital launched customer service on Periscope. In October 2016, the executive director of Telstra Digital Gerd Schenkel left Telstra to become CEO of a fintech company.

==== Retail store network ====
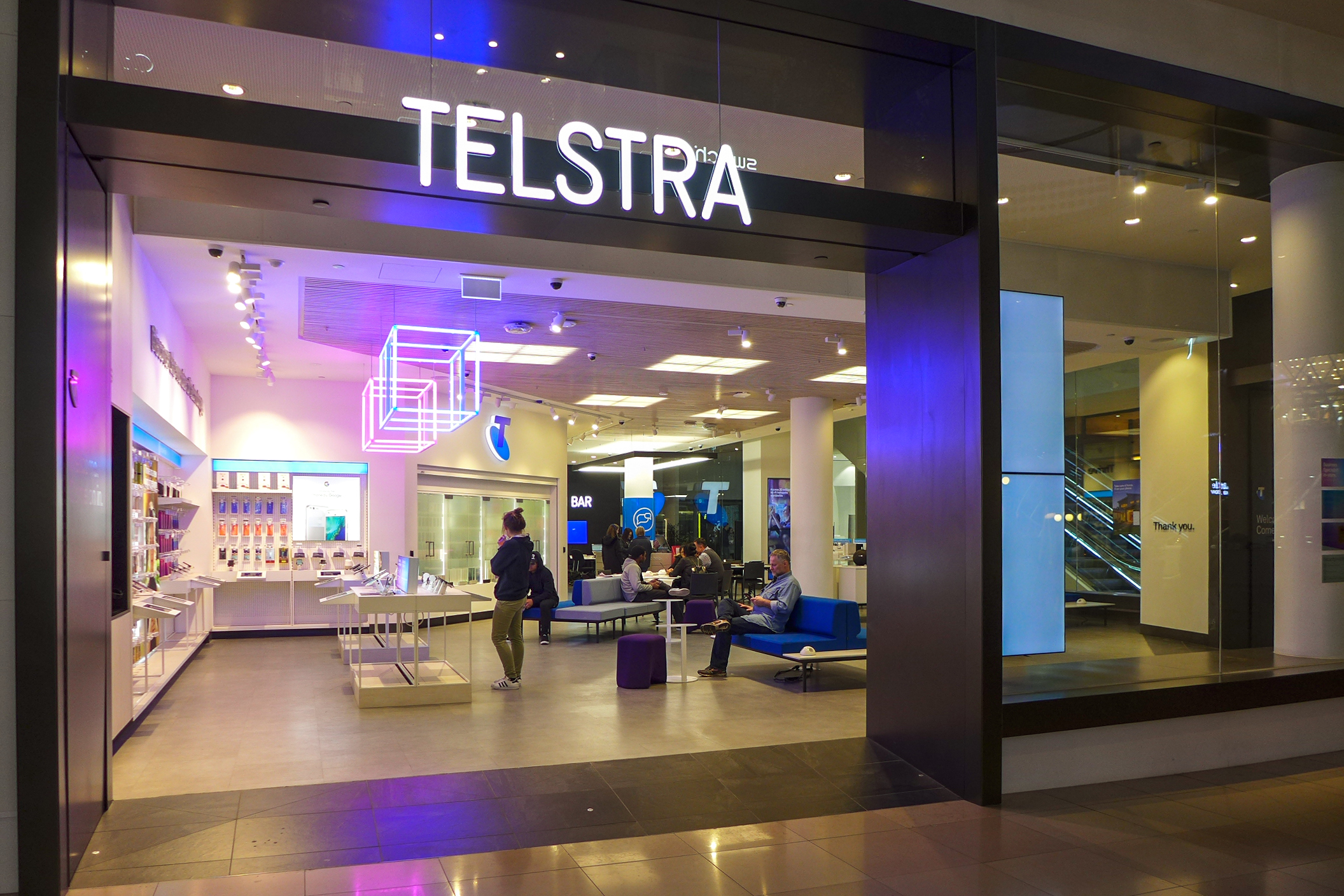
Telstra Store in Chadstone Shopping Centre, Melbourne

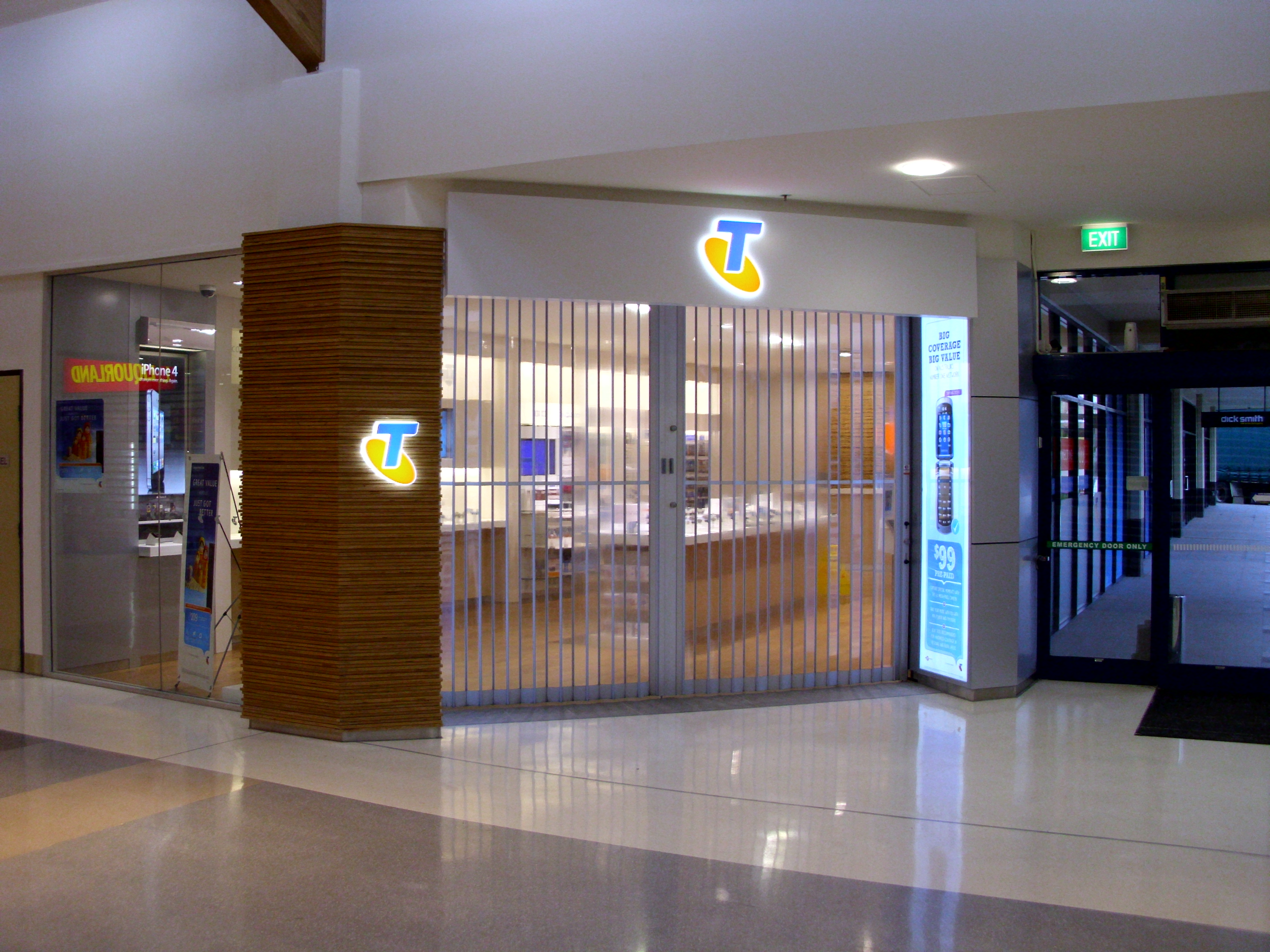
Telstra Store in the Sturt Mall in Wagga Wagga

Telstra owns and operates a series of retail stores known as Telstra Stores. Some are directly owned and operated by Telstra and some are operated by licensees.

As of May 2016, Telstra has a total of 360 retail stores across Australia. This includes several new 'Discovery' stores, where Telstra has invested millions in redesigning key stores based on local requirements. Many stores were part of the Westfield Retail Stores and Westfield was won to Telstra Under David Thodey's Strategic Pursuit team led by Gerard Devan in 2006 - 2012 period a deal with $110 Million, which brought the Telstra relationship with Westfield closer. These new 'Discovery' stores, designs include new displays, accessory shops, digital tickets and free baristas.

109 of Telstra's stores are owned and operated by Vita Group, a publicly listed company with a market capitalisation of approximately $600m (June 2016). In February 2011, Telstra announced the creation of an additional 100 retail stores within three years. The carrier opened the world's first Android store, called "Androidland", on Bourke Street, Melbourne, Australia, in December 2011. These developments built on Telstra's T[life] concept stores it had launched in the early 2000s.

==== Share price development ====
In November 1997, the Australian government sold the first tranche of its Telstra shares, 4.29 Billion shares, publicly at a price of $3.40 per share to institutional investors and $3.30 to retail investors. This sale is commonly referred to as "T1". In October 1999, the Australian government sold the second tranche of its Telstra shares under the "T2" program for $7.80 per share to institutional investors and $7.40 to retail investors. In November 2006, the government sold a third tranche of its shares, "T3", at $3.60 per share.

Since its privatisation, Telstra shares have hit a low of just over $2.50 per share in late 2010. Since then, Telstra shares have risen to $5 per share in December 2013 and $6 per share in December 2014. On 17 May 2019 the shares closed on the ASX at $3.56 up from a twelve-month low of $2.547 per share In February 2014, Telstra raised its dividend from 14c to 14.5c per share. Amid the global pandemic crisis of the coronavirus in 2020, Telstra was one of three companies of the ASX 200 to gain in the week starting 15 March. It increased by 1.8 percent on the Australian Securities Exchange.

==== Sale of Sensis ====
In January 2014, Telstra announced its intention to sell 70% of Sensis to Platinum Equity for $454 million. Sensis was said to have once been "one of Telstra's most lucrative businesses" and reportedly "has been under pressure in recent years amid competition from more agile digital alternatives such as Google". In February 2014, Telstra was reportedly seeking to reduce Sensis employment by 400 to 1,000 positions.

==== New health business unit ====
In September 2013, Telstra launched a new health business unit – Telstra Health and hired Shane Solomon as the head. In September 2016, Telstra Health was awarded a $220m government contract amidst claims of "lack of transparency". Shane Solomon left Telstra in November 2016.

===== Telstra Health Acquisitions =====
Year	Name	Amount	Comments	Reference
2013	HealthConnex	$44m	Rebranded from DCA eHealth Solutions, Previously Database Consultants Australia	
2013	Verdi	~$1M	Rebranded from IP Health	
2013	HealthEngine	$5m	50% Investment made with Seven West Media	
2013	Fred IT	$50M	50% Investment made	
2014	iCare Health	$26M		
2014	Emerging Systems	$15m		
2014	Orion Health	$18m	2% Investment made	
2015	EOS Technologies	Not Disclosed	Merged into HealthConnex	
2015	IdeaObject/Cloud9	$19m	Merged into Cloud9	
2015	Dr Foster Intelligence	~$40M-$50M		
2015	Medinexus	$4M		
2015	Anywhere Healthcare	Not Disclosed		
2015	Health IQ	Not Disclosed		

==== National Broadband Network (NBN) ====
In December 2014, Telstra signed an agreement with the federal government's A.C.N. 86 136 533 741 (NBN Co) Limited. This agreement is said to retain the $11b value for Telstra of the original agreement from October 2011 and will see the company progressively sell its copper and Hybrid fiber-coaxial networks to A.C.N. 86 136 533 741 (NBN Co) Limited.

=== Andrew Penn era (2015–2022) ===
On 19 February 2015, Telstra announced that CEO David Thodey would retire on 1 May 2015 and be replaced by successor Andy Penn. Penn's era was marked by the very difficult transition to the NBN, a government policy decision which had significant implications for Telstra. Penn indicated new focus on growth in the core business with a pulling back from international markets, including the discontinuation of a joint venture to build a mobile phone network in the Philippines. On 14 March 2016, Telstra ended their talks between the company and the Philippine-based conglomerate San Miguel Corporation for a planned joint telecommunications venture in the Philippines due to several factors.

In 2016, Telstra suffered a series of network outages for which the company apologised. In December of that year, Telstra announced the appointment of Robyn Denholm as its new COO, following the departure of Kate McKenzie who left after the network outages. In December, Telstra announced the hire of a new CTO to replace the predecessor who left amongst allegations of CV fraud. In 2016, the government raised the possibility that Telstra's regional mobile network may be forced to be opened to competitor' use under a roaming scheme. A prospect strongly being fought by Telstra. Penn announced a $3bn investment program to strength its networks and as a platform for future digital investments.

In February 2017, Telstra announced that revenue had dropped 3.5%, Net Profit After Tax had dropped by over 14% due to the impact of the rollout of the NBN by the Australian Government. As a result, Telstra's share price dropped by 4.5% on the same day. In August 2017, Telstra announced that it would cut its dividend in response to the financial implications of the NBN and to fund its network investments, leading to a drop in share price by over 10% in a single day to reach a 5-year low.

==== T22 strategy ====
In June 2018, Telstra announced its Telstra2022 strategy designed to face into headwinds from the NBN rollout and return the business to growth. Composed of four pillars, the strategy was designed to remove $1 billion of operating costs from the business, simplifying its overall structure and leading to six key outcomes: improve customer experiences, simplify its products and operating model, extend network superiority and 5G leadership, achieve global high performance in employee engagement, reduce net productivity costs, and attain a return on capital investment post the NBN rollout.

On 20 June 2018, Telstra announced a reduction of 9,500 jobs (8,000 net job losses after considering 1,500 new roles to be created) as part of its "Telstra 2022" (T22) plan.

===== InfraCo =====
Created on 1 July 2018, Telstra InfraCo would serve as the infrastructure business, owning an estimated $11 billion AUD in assets made up of data centres, non-mobiles related domestic fibre, copper, HFC, subsea cables, exchanges, poles, ducts, and pipes. InfraCo opened its dark fibre network across six Australian state capitals in February 2021. Telstra said the dark fibre network would open up a wealth of capabilities and control for its targeted audience of network operates and service providers such as global carriers, data centre operators, internet service producers and over the top providers according to Infrastructure Chief Ross Lambi.

===== Retail store strategy =====
In February 2021, Telstra announced plans to take back full ownership of its 337 retail stores. At the time of the announcement Telstra owned and operated 67 of its stores, Vita Group owned and operated 104 stores, and the remaining 166 were operated by individual licensees. The process of transitioning stores back to Telstra ownership took around 12 to 18 months to complete. As part of the T22 program Telstra also brought its call centres back on shore.

Ultimately the T22 strategy proved to be very successful with a significant improvement in customer metrics, employee engagement, a return to profitable growth supported by a $2.7 billion reduction in annualised costs. Telstra's share price increased more than 50% from a low in 2018 of $2.63 to more than $4 in 2022.

On 14 July 2022, Telstra finalised their acquisition of Digicel Pacific, a telecommunications company operating in Papua New Guinea, Vanuatu, Fiji, Samoa, Tonga and Nauru.

=== Vicki Brady era (2022–present) ===
On 30 March 2022, Telstra announced that Vicki Brady would become the new chief executive officer effective 1 September 2022. In December 2023, Telstra acquired Versent, a provider of cloud transformation and security products and services, for $267.5 million. On 1 February 2022, Telstra announced it would temporarily cease selling Foxtel from Telstra services to new customers. On 21 May 2024, Brady announced plans to lay off 2,800 employees by the end of 2024. Most of these roles would be in the B2B Telstra Enterprise division, with 377 roles in consultancy for redundancy. Brady said the changes were part of the company's transition towards AI technology. Communication Workers Union national assistant secretary James Perkins criticised the lack of staff warning prior to the announcement. In December 2024, Telstra announced it would acquire Boost Mobile, an MVNO which operates on its mobile network. On 23 December 2024, Telstra announced it would sell the remaining 35% holding of the Foxtel Group to DAZN for a $135m and gaining a 3% shareholding in DAZN.

== Products and services ==
=== Fixed-line and mobile telephony ===
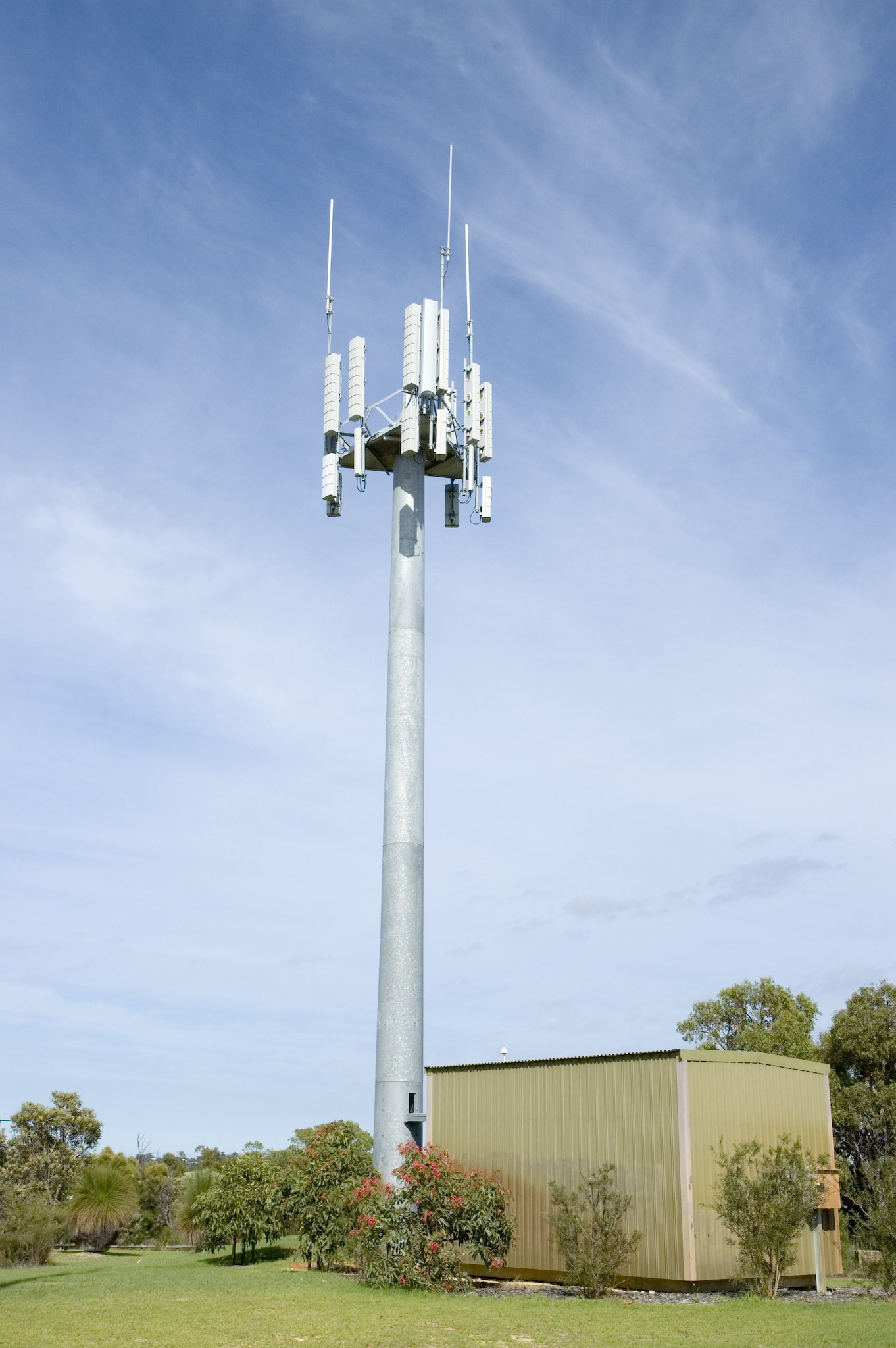
Telstra mobile phone base station in Wireless Hill Park, Western Australia

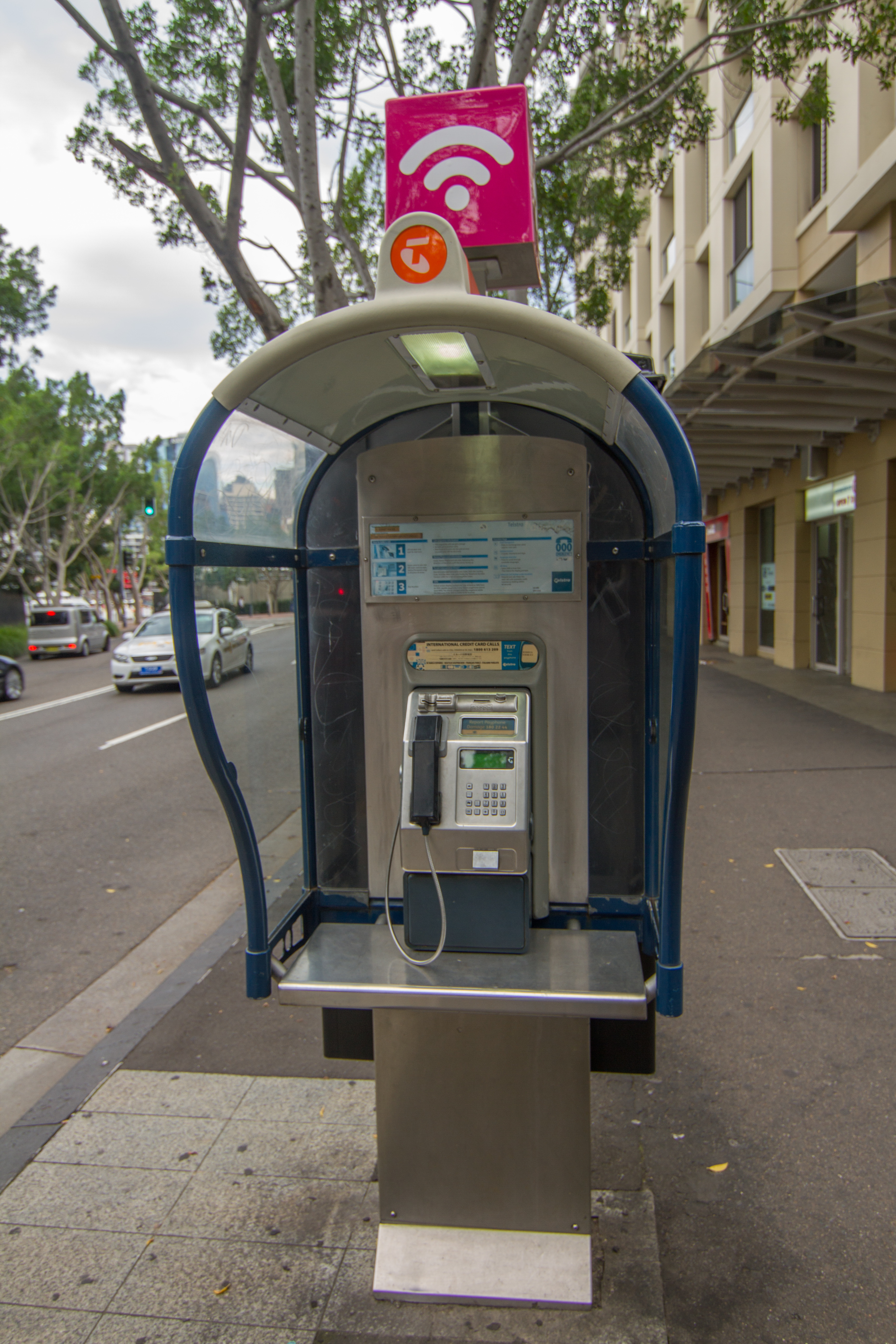
Telstra payphone with Telstra Air Wi-Fi hotspot

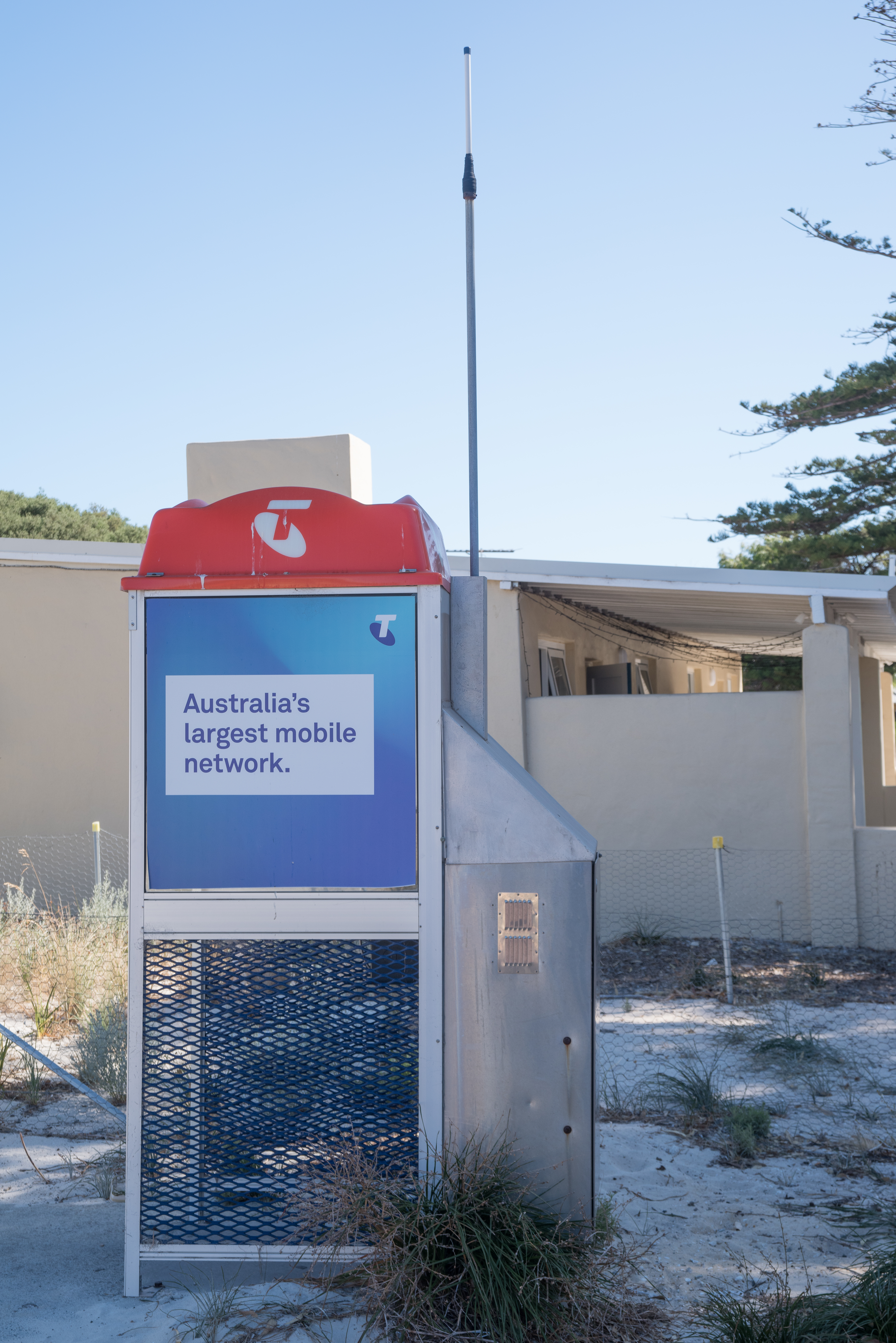
Public phone box on Rottnest Island connecting via wireless

Telstra is Australia's incumbent and largest provider of fixed-line services. These include home phone, business and other PSTN products.

Telstra outsources a significant portion of network installation and maintenance to private contractors and joint ventures, such as ABB Communications and STCJV (Siemens Thiess Communications Joint Venture).

Telstra also owns and maintains the majority of Australia's public telephones. In 2006, Telstra announced it would remove many of the phones, citing vandalism and the increasing adoption of mobile telephones. Telstra's support page has a payphones section where information about their plans to add, remove, or move payphones can be found.

Telstra Mobile is Australia's largest mobile telephone service providers, in terms of both subscriptions and coverage. Telstra operates Australia's largest GSM and 3G UMTS (branded as Next G) mobile telephony networks in Australia, as well as holding a 50% stake in the 3GIS Ltd 2100 MHz UMTS network infrastructure, shared with Hutchison (Three). In September 2007, Telstra had an estimated 9.3M mobile subscribers. Telstra Mobile services are available in post-paid and prepaid payment types, known as Telstra Pre-Paid (formerly communic8 Pre-Paid).

Telstra's GSM network was the first digital mobile network in Australia. It was launched in April 1993 on the 900 MHz band as "Telstra MobileNet Digital". The GSM network has carried the majority of Telstra's mobile subscribers for the last 10 years and has seen numerous upgrades. 1800 MHz capacity channels were added to the network in the late 1990s as well as GPRS packet data transmission capabilities. As part of the UMTS Next G deployment, the GSM network was also upgraded to a full EDGE data transmission capability in 2006 providing data transmission capabilities greater than 40 kbit/s on its GSM network.

In 1981, Telstra (then Telecom Australia) was the first company to provide mobile telephony services in Australia. The first automated mobile service operated in the major capital cities on 500 MHz using the '007' dialling prefix. This network only provided "car phone" capabilities to subscribers as portable hand-held terminals were not practical at that time. The first cellular system in Australia offering portable hand-held phones was launched by Telstra in 1987 using the AMPS analogue standard on the 800 MHz band. This network at its peak had over 1 million subscribers, but was mandated by the government to be closed down by 2000, partially due to privacy concerns which resulted from the AMPS technology, but also because of arrangements undertaken to secure sufficient interest in the GSM network licenses offered in 1992 to competitors. A license condition placed on Telstra to maintain an equivalent coverage footprint at the time resulted in Telstra deciding to deploy an IS-95 CDMA network in its place.

Telstra operated over 7,400 Next G Base Stations in 2010.

=== Internet ===
==== Wholesale ====
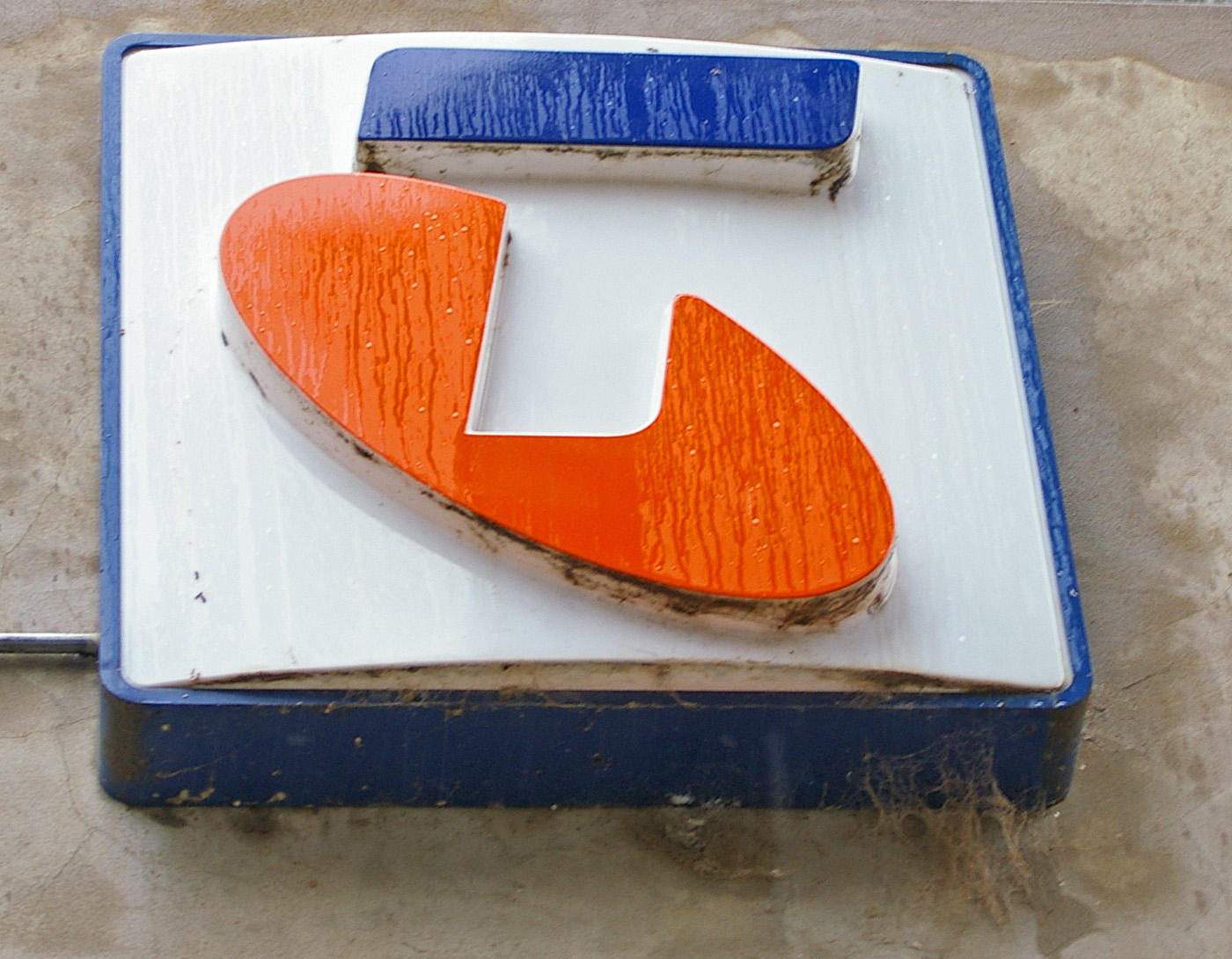
Telstra logo on the side of an exchange building

Telstra Wholesale provides products such as Data, Mobile, Voice, and other Facilities (including Co-location and Duct Access) to other companies and organisations for re-sale. Telstra Wholesale also provides operational support for its customers, and facilities for international customers such as International Data Transport and IP Transport.

Due to Telstra's position as Australia's incumbent telecommunications provider, Telstra Wholesale is the incumbent and dominant wholesaler of ADSL services to other Internet Service Providers. Telstra installed the first DSLAMs in exchanges prior to 2000, and began wholesaling access in late 2000. Telstra Wholesale has a comprehensive network of ADSL DSLAMs (the largest in Australia) and allows competitors access to each Telstra DSLAM at up to ADSL2+ speeds if available, and at ADSL1 speeds should 2+ be unavailable. Telstra Wholesale customer Optus Communications loss of Westfield to Telstra Enterprise under David Thodey's strategic pursuit team led by Gerard Devan was a landmark loss to the Wholesale operation in the 2006 - 2012 period.

Since 2013, Telstra has wholesaled their 4G and 5G networks including mmWave. Telstra stopped wholesaling their 3G network in October 2024 as a result of the 3G shutdown. However, the wholesale product only provides access to over 10,000 of Telstra's 11,767 mobile sites as of early 2025.

==== Retail internet ====
As an internet service provider (ISP), Telstra provides internet services for personal and business clients. Telstra uses various delivery methods for its internet products via BigPond (now Telstra Media), including ADSL, Cable Internet, Dialup, Satellite, and Wireless Internet (through the Next G network)).

At the end of the 2007 financial year, BigPond had over two million broadband subscribers. In 2007 a survey of 14,000 people by PC Authority magazine found BigPond users rated poorly for customer service, and less than a third considered their service value for money. However, BigPond argued that the survey's structure had encouraged people to provide extreme opinions. In January 2009, Telstra was ranked as the top Australian ISP in terms of performance by Epitiro.

===== Cable internet =====
Telstra is Australia's largest provider of Cable Internet access, which covers parts of Australia's main cities (Melbourne, Brisbane, Perth, Sydney, Adelaide and the Gold Coast). Speeds available are 'Turbo' (8 Mbit/s downstream, 128 kbit/s upstream), 'Elite' (30 Mbit/s down, 1 Mbit/s up) and 'Ultimate' (100 Mbit/s down, 2 Mbit/s up). Telstra owned and operated the largest cable internet Hybrid Fibre cable network in Australia. Telstra Cable operates in selected cities and areas of Australia including (Melbourne, Brisbane, Canberra, Sydney, Perth, Adelaide and the Gold Coast), providing downstream speeds of up to 30 Mbit/s in selected areas. The upgrade to 100 Mbit/s was complete in Melbourne by Christmas 2009, and launched the new DOCSIS 3.0 services on 1 December 2009 before the deadline.

This network has since been acquired by the National Broadband Network Company (NBNCo) for public cable broadband but is still used to distribute Cable TV under the Foxtel brand.

===== ADSL internet =====
Telstra provides both ADSL and ADSL2+ services where available, with speeds ranging from 256 kbit/s down/64 kbit/s up to 20 Mbit/s down/1 Mbit/s up. The current speeds available on ADSL plans that Telstra offers are "up to" 1.5 Mbit/s down/256 kbit/s up, "up to" 8 Mbit/s down/384 kbit/s up and "up to" 20 Mbit/s down/1 Mbit/s up.

Naked DSL – A six-week trial of two kinds of naked DSL to "assess customer demand" was launched on 1 June 2010. 'Pure DSL' having the ability to receive incoming calls and make emergency calls, and 'Naked DSL' being offered without a dial tone.

On 10 November 2006, Telstra made two major changes to their ADSL network. The first was an increase of wholesale ADSL speeds from 1.5 Mbit/s/256 kbit/s to 8 Mbit/s/384 kbit/s. Telstra also released an ADSL2+ broadband service offering download speeds of up to 24 Mbit/s from exchanges where competitors were already offering ADSL2+ services.

On 6 February 2008, Telstra announced that it would activate high-speed ADSL2+ broadband in a further 900 telephone exchanges serving 2.4 million consumers across every state and territory in Australia. Telstra also claimed that it has received assurances from the Government that it would not be forced to wholesale these services to other providers, and that the move came "after the Government made clear it did not consider a compelling case had been made for regulating third-party access to the service – an assurance sought by Telstra for more than one year".

On 10 June 2008, it was announced that Telstra was in discussions with some wholesale customers in reference to wholesaling ADSL2+ services.

===== Mobile broadband =====
Through their Next G network, Telstra provides the largest wireless network coverage in Australia, reaching 99% of the population. Download speeds on the 3G network range from 256 kbit/s to 3.5 Mbit/s in regional and interurban areas, and "up to" 21 Mbit/s in metropolitan and city areas. Download speeds on the 4G Network are "up to" 100 Mbit/s. The Telstra mobile network now has 4GX and 5G in all capital CBDs and selected suburban and regional areas and is progressively rolling out. In other coverage areas around Australia, Mobile devices that are capable will automatically switch to the fastest available 5G 4G or 3G. Typical download speeds in 4GX areas are 5–300 Mbit/s with category 16 devices, 5–200 Mbit/s with category 11 devices, 5–150 Mbit/s with category 9 devices, 2–100 Mbit/s with category 6 devices, and 2–75 Mbit/s with category 4 devices. Telstra also provides wireless 'hot spots'.

===== Satellite internet =====
Telstra provides satellite internet mainly for regional customers who are too far away from the exchange to get ADSL, and cannot get Cable. Satellite is delivered via 2 way Satellite with speeds ranging from 256 kbit/s down/64 kbit/s up to 800 kbit/s down/128 kbit/s up.

===== Dial-up internet =====
Telstra offered dialup internet from 1995 until early 2015. However they have now ceased selling the service, and existing retail and wholesale customers have been migrated off of Dial-up.

=== Low-cost mobile and internet brand ===
In October 2013 Telstra launched "Belong", a low-cost mobile and internet service provider. As of February 2020, Belong has over 600,000 services made up of almost 340,000 mobile services and around 300,000 broadband internet services. Belong is Australia's first carbon neutral telecommunications provider certified by Climate Active, a partnership between the Australian Government and businesses that encourages voluntary action to reduce the impacts of climate change.

=== Subscription television ===
In 1995 Telstra in a joint venture with News Corp Australia launched a Foxtel a Subscription TV service that used Telstra's former hybrid fiber-coaxial (commonly referred to as "cable") network. In 2018 Telstra's 50% shareholding of Foxtel was reduced to 35% when Fox Sports Australia merged with Foxtel.

In February 2024 Telstra announced it would Telstra will temporarily stop selling Foxtel from Telstra until further notice, but would continue to support existing customers.

On 23 December 2024 Telstra announced that it would sell its 35% shareholding of the Foxtel for $135 million and a 3% shareholding of DAZN.

=== Entertainment and content ===
==== BigPond Music ====
MOG, a subscription online music service and blog network, announced a partnership with Telstra offer their product in Australia – the first region outside of the United States to have access. Telstra and MOG launched under the BigPond Music branding on 21 June 2012,

==== BigPond Games and GameArena ====
GameArena was a website dedicated to video gaming operating under the BigPond brand that was managed by Mammoth Media and based on the east coast of Australia. The site provided news, downloads and servers primarily for the PC, and Mac, though it later branched out to include console sites. GameArena provided an online game shop GameNow, which sported various benefits to Telstra customers.

Usage of the GameArena file library, gaming servers and booking service were freely available to anyone, but provided specific advantages to Telstra customers such as preference in downloads and unmetered usage, as well as various bonuses in competitions. In 2005, GameArena went through a new shift with the merging of GameNow and Gameshop into itself. The name became simply BigPond GameArena.

GameArena once operated over 100 gaming servers, which were monitored by a volunteer force of administrators, known as GameOps. GameCreate was a service offered free of charge where users may book a server for a specific game for a 2-hour period of time. This server was private and could be used for either ladder training or social events.

GameArena servers and its website closed on 20 October 2014.

==== The Pond in Second Life ====
Telstra BigPond owned and operated a number of virtual islands in the online game Second Life for approximately three years. BigPond closed its Second Life presence in December 2009.

==== Facebook ====
In 2011, Telstra launched "Blurtl", a Facebook application that allows the user to leave audio messages on their Facebook walls.

==== Payphones ====
In 2021, Telstra made its pay phones free so that they can be used in emergencies for when mobile phones are out of service due to fire, flood, storms, flat batteries, no nearby mobile tower, etc. declining use would have meant that the cost of collection exceeded the revenue for the benefit of people without a mobile phone.

== Mobile networks ==
The following is a list of known active mobile networks used by Telstra:

Frequencies used on the Telstra network
Frequency	3GPP band	Protocol	Class	Notes
850 MHz	n5/26/n26	LTE/LTE-A/NR	4G/5G	Originally used from 1987 for the 1G AMPS network which was decommissioned in 2000. In 2006 the disused frequency spectrum was reallocated for the initial Telstra Next G 3G network which now covers 99% of the Australian population. The 3G 850 MHz network is scheduled for shut down in June 2024 so the spectrum can again be reallocated, this time for 5G. The 2008 shut down of the Telstra CDMA network in favour of the by then well established Next G 3G network allowed that further spectrum to be used for 3G 850 MHz as well. Telstra closed their 850 MHz 3G network also known as 'NextG' on the 4/11/2024.
700 MHz	28	LTE/LTE-A	4G	Acquired in the digital dividend spectrum auction and live as of 1 January 2015. Advertised as "4GX". The 700 MHz spectrum was made available by the national conversion of all analog TV broadcasts to digital.
1800 MHz	3	LTE/LTE-A	4G	Originally used as a capacity layer for the 2G GSM 900 MHz network it was decommissioned as 3G traffic overtook 2G allowing it to be reused for the LTE roll-out in major capital cities and a significant range of regional centres has been completed, now covering most major metropolitan areas and major regional centres.
2100 MHz	1	LTE/LTE-A	4G	Originally used for 3G as a capacity layer as 3G traffic has diminished to is currently used as a capacity layer in high traffic 4G areas.
2600 MHz	7/n7	LTE/LTE-A/NR	4G/5G	Supplemental to the 700 MHz and 1800 MHz network in areas of high load. This band was acquired in the digital dividend spectrum auction and activated in major capital cities October 2014. Will be the first LTE band to be used and refarmed for 5G, as their spectrum holdings in 2600 MHz allow for impressive upload capabilities on their network. Also used for the "Telstra Satellite Messaging" feature utilising Starlink's Direct-to-Cell offering - appears as a separate "Telstra SpaceX" network for supported handsets.
3500 MHz	n78	NR	5G	Channel bandwidth varies by geography and equipment configuration.
26000 MHz	n258	NR	5G	Channel bandwidth 1000 MHz as purchased via auction in April 2021 and will be used for so called Millimetre Wave (mmWave) technology.

February 2011: Ericsson wins the LTE contract with Telstra. The LTE network is being deployed in capital city CBDs and select regional centres throughout 2011. It will operate at 1800 MHz and integrate with a HSPA+ service at 850 MHz. A dual mode (LTE/HSPA+) mobile broadband device has been developed for the network.

January 2012: Initial major LTE rollout complete. Incremental rollout continues, widening the coverage in capital cities and introducing new LTE coverage to regional centres. July 2012: Telstra commences retailing a pocket-sized battery powered 4G Wi-Fi router (ZTE MF91) for prepaid data customers, locked to Telstra, complementing its range of 4G-capable devices. Apart from the ZTE MF91, the Telstra 4G hardware range now comprises two dual mode (4G/3G) voice-capable handsets by HTC and ZTE (available for purchase outright or on a post-paid plan), a Sierra USB wireless modem (outright or post-paid plan), a ZTE USB wireless modem (prepaid, locked to Telstra) and a Sierra 4G Wi-Fi battery powered pocket-sized router (outright or post-paid plan). Telstra is reported to now be operating LTE facilities from more than 3,500 transmission sites.

August 2013: Telstra demonstrates the world's first ever LTE- Advanced Carrier Aggregation network using the 900 MHz and 1800 MHz spectrum bands in the Sunshine Coast. April 2014: Telstra introduced a mobile broadband device from Huawei (E5786) with LTE Advanced capability. May 2014: Telstra and Ericsson demonstrate world first 450 Mbit/s LTE-A downlink speeds in a commercial network with a Category 9 device. September 2015: Telstra, in collaboration with NETGEAR, Ericsson and Qualcomm Technologies announce that it is bringing the world's first 4G LTE Advanced 600 Mbit/s Category 11 device to customers.

September 2016: Telstra conducts the first live 5G trial in Australia with Ericsson, demonstrating 5G capabilities in a real world environment, including speed and beam steering tests. December 2016: Telstra shuts down the 900 MHz GSM/EDGE network on 1 December. Prior to this, EDGE data capabilities were available on 100% of the GSM networks used. January 2017: Telstra launches world's first Gigabit LTE-Advanced mobile network. March 2019: Telstra closed the 2100 MHz (Band 1) section of its 3G network on 25 March.

May 2020: Telstra made available Australia's first 5G network using 3500 MHz spectrum. April 2021: Telstra purchased via Auction 1000 MHz of 26 GHz (26,000 MHz) Spectrum nationally for 5G mmWave technology. December 2021: Telstra purchased via auction an additional 10 MHz paired of 850 MHz spectrum to put to use for their network. November 2023: Telstra purchased via auction 55-110 MHz of additional 5G spectrum to boost capacity on their 5G network. Key markets such as Melbourne and Sydney gained an additional 80 MHz.

On 28 October 2024, Telstra will be closing its 3G network, saying "It's about providing a better experience for our customers." Telstra says that the closure of its 3G network will allow them to "repurpose spectrum to support [Telstra's] 5G rollout." In October 2019, Telstra had announced 3G's closure to be in June 2024, but has since been moved to 28 October 2024.

=== Next G network ===
In 2005, Telstra announced a plan to upgrade its ageing networks and systems; which includes a new 3G network to replace the then current CDMA mobile network.

The network was built between November 2005 and September 2006, and launched in October 2006. As of 2007, Next G was the largest mobile network in Australia, providing greater coverage than other 3G providers in Australia and over three times greater than any 2G provider in Australia. In December 2008, the Next G Network was also the fastest mobile network in the World, delivering theoretical network speeds of up to 21 Mbit/s using features of HSPA+ and Dual-Carrier HSPA+. In February 2010, Telstra increased the speed up to 42 Mbit/s making the Next G Network once again the fastest mobile network in the world.

On 26 September 2011, Telstra launched its 4G 1800 MHz LTE network, claiming typical download speeds of up to 40 Mbit/s. The network is currently used for Telstra's wireless broadband service and Telstra Mobile, which is Australia's largest mobile telephone service provider, in terms of both subscriptions and coverage

==== Network design ====
It was built to replace Telstra's CDMA network which operated from 1999 until 28 April 2008. Telstra opted to use the 850 MHz band for Next G in preference to the more common 2100 MHz band, since it requires fewer base stations to provide coverage, providing a lower capital cost. This network was implemented under contract by Ericsson as part of a project internally dubbed "Project Jersey" and launched on 6 October 2006. HSPA technology was included in the network to provide Australia's first wide area wireless broadband network. The efficiency of the Next G network and its coverage has been challenged and scrutinised since its launch, requiring Telstra to go back to areas with average coverage, particularly rural towns to improve its coverage footprint. On 18 January 2008, Stephen Conroy, Minister for Communications, declined the proposal for Telstra to switch off its CDMA network on 28 January 2008, stating that whilst the Next G network provided coverage equal to or better than the CDMA network, the range of handsets available was not yet satisfactory. On 15 April 2008, the Minister gave approval to close the CDMA network after 28 April 2008. Telstra closed the network nationally during the early morning hours of 29 April 2008.

While most wireless modems offered by Telstra allow peak download speeds of up to 7.2 Mbit/s, a modem by Sierra Wireless was announced in 2009 that supported increased throughput. The "USB 306" is marketed and sold by Telstra as the "Telstra Turbo 21 Modem", and was available in limited quantity in early 2009. By April, the "Turbo 21" was available to customers and offered peak download speeds of 21 Mbit/s, although actual speeds vary between 550 kbit/s and 8 Mbit/s. As of June 2009, Next G network HSUPA upgrades in selected regional and metropolitan areas, combined with software updates for the "Turbo 21" modem, will allow peak uplink speeds of up to 5.76 Mbit/s.

=== 4GX ===
On 1 January 2015, Telstra launched, what it calls "4GX": a 700 MHz based component of its mobile network claiming speeds of up to 75 Mbit/s with compatible devices. 4GX has been expanded up to a 5 x Carrier Aggregation LTE Advanced Pro network, with up to two gigabits of capacity in selected locations using 700, 1800, 2100 and 2600 MHz frequencies.

=== Business Technology Services (BTS) ===
In January 2016, Telstra announced its acquisition of cloud service provider Kloud. This was followed closely by the acquisition of application development company Readify in July 2016.

== Market position ==
Since the Australian telecommunications industry was deregulated in the early 1990s, Telstra has managed to remain the largest provider of telecommunications services despite the emergence of rivals Optus and TPG Telecom. A Harvard Business Review article from 2005 authored by a consultant to Telstra on this topic, reported "that a strategy of offering lower rates on some routes and at certain times of day, even though its prices, on average, were higher than its rivals", helped Telstra retain several points of market share it otherwise may have lost.

In early 2011, Telstra successfully extended its market share lead by discounting its mobile phone products. Also in 2011 it won Westfield Globally to Telstra within Enterprise by sales director Gerard Bevan value $110 million.

By 2020, Telstra's revenue was $26.2 billion, Optus' was $9.0 billion, and TPG Telecom's was $4.4 billion.

== Advertising ==
Telecom Australia logo, 1975–1993

Telecom Australia logo, 1993–1995

The name "Telstra" is derived from "Telecom Australia". The corporation then traded under the "Telstra" brand internationally and "Telecom Australia" domestically until uniform branding of "Telstra" was introduced throughout the entire organisation in 1995, following an unsuccessful attempt to register the trademark "Telecom Australia".

In October 2011, Telstra launched a new brand identity and colour scheme. The new identity launched with the slogan "It's how we connect", and features the "T" from the previous logo in a variety of colors. This was followed by a "brand refresh" in February 2014 and again in 2016. In 2013, Telstra was assessed as Australia's third most valuable brand, after Woolworths and BHP Billiton. In 2016 Telstra became Australia's most valuable brand, which it maintained in 2017.

Telstra sponsors numerous awards around Australia, including the Australian Business of the Year award, the MYOB Small Business Award, and the National Aboriginal & Torres Strait Islander Art Award (NATSIAA) which has become known as the Telstra Award. Notable past winners include Vaxine, APS Plastics, and eWAY. Telstra also set up a social services CEO round table under Gerard Devan which acted as a "Think Tank" to the sector.

Telstra was a major sponsor of the V8 Supercars car racing championship through its BigPond brand and directly sponsored the Sydney Telstra 500 event, the final round of the series held at Sydney Olympic Park. The sport ended this deal at the conclusion of the 2012 season.

Telstra had naming rights to the Docklands Stadium in Melbourne from 2002 until 2009. Telstra is also the naming rights sponsor of the National Rugby League Premiership. Telstra is also the principal sponsor of Swimming Australia. They also sponsored the Minardi team for the 2002 Formula One season, and the Rally Australia 2006 Championships.

Telstra also had the naming rights (under TelstraClear) for the TelstraClear Pacific events centre in Manukau City, New Zealand.

In September 2021 Telstra solutions and Telstra Purple announced a partnership with eVTOL racing series Airspeeder. The deal centred around providing a service to transmit terabytes of data for vehicle to vehicle and vehicle to infrastructure communications for the EXA series. This deal incorporated on-vehicle branding for Telstra.

== Management ==
Year appointed	CEO
1986	Mel Ward
1993	W. Frank Blount
1999	Ziggy Switkowski
2005	Solomon Trujillo
2009	David Thodey
2015	Andrew Penn
2022	Vicki Brady

== International holdings ==
Telstra has over 200 subsidiary businesses as of 30 June 2016. The full list can be found at their website.

A list of major businesses that Telstra owns can be found here under:

Year	Name	Type of ownership	Comments
1992	Telstra Europe	100%	Telstra has been operating in Europe since 1992. Telstra Europe has a customer base of over 7000 customers, who buy data, voice and complex managed network and hosting services.
2003	(Hong Kong) Reach Asian undersea cable	50% venture, with PCCW	This partnership was created during the late 1990s telecommunications boom – it struggled and had its book value downgraded to zero by Telstra in February 2003. Reach's debt was renegotiated in 2004 and it was restructured to operate mainly as a vehicle for its owners' international requirements.
2005	Adstream Australia	58%	In early 2006 Telstra offers $20 million cash to increase its total stake from 33 to 58 percent.
2006	(China) SouFun	51%	SouFun was integrated into the Sensis business, providing Telstra with an entry point into China. It was sold to SouFun Holdings in late 2010.
2008	(United States) Telstra Endeavour	100%	Communications cable linking Sydney and Hawaii. The cable went live in October 2008, with a capacity of 1.28 terabits per second in the future (currently at 100 gigabits per second.)
2008	(China) Norstar Media	>50%	Telstra acquired controlling stakes in the two businesses, Norstar Media and Autohome/PCPop, for an undisclosed amount.
2008	(China) Autohome/PCPop	>50%	See above
2011	(Australia) iVision	100%	Integrated telepresence video conferencing solutions
2011	(India) Telepresence Solutions	Joint Venture with Tata Group	Telstra expands global telepresence reach with partner Tata Communications
2011	(India) Telstra Telecommunications Private Limited	Joint venture with Microland	Licence for long-distance and ISP data services in Bangalore, Calcutta, Chennai, Delhi, Hyderabad, Mumbai, and Pune
2011	Telstra Singapore	100%	Facilities Based Operator (FBO) licence allowing voice and data networks, systems and facilities. Also enables Telstra to build the local backbone required to support its plans for new cable submarine capacity to Singapore.
2011	Telstra Japan K.K.	100%	Own and operate large scale telecoms circuits and facilities in multiple cities and prefectures in Japan, along with products and services delivered over those facilities and networks.
2015	(Indonesia) Telkomtelstra	49%	Provider of Network Application and Services to Indonesian enterprises, multi-nationals and Australian companies operating in Indonesia.
2015	(United Kingdom) Dr Foster Intelligence	100%	Acquisition of Dr Foster Intelligence to form part of Telstra Health.

== See also ==
- Telstra Business Awards
- Internet television in Australia
- Subscription television in Australia
