= Nick Kaldas =

Australian police officer

Nick Kaldas AO, APM
- Born: 1958 (age 67–68); Egypt
- Police career
- Country: Australia
- Department: New South Wales Police Force
- Service years: 1981–2016
- Rank: Deputy Commissioner
- Awards: Australian Police Medal

Naguib "Nick" Kaldas AO, APM (born 1958) is a former Australian police officer and former deputy commissioner of the New South Wales Police Force. Though considered to be a possible future Commissioner, in March 2016 Kaldas announced his decision to leave the Police Force and currently works for the United Nations.

== Early life ==
Kaldas was born in Egypt in 1958 to Coptic Australian parents. The family emigrated to Australia in 1969.

== Policing career ==
In 1981 Kaldas graduated from the New South Wales Police Force's academy. He worked for more than ten years as a hostage negotiator.

While the head of the New South Wales homicide squad, Kaldas was responsible for a number of high-profile murder investigations, including the death of Samantha Knight, the murder of John Newman and the investigation into the murders committed by Sef Gonzales.

In 2004 Kaldas spent eight months in Iraq where he trained the local police.

In March 2009 Kaldas was seconded to the Special Tribunal for Lebanon investigating the 2005 assassination of Rafic Hariri. Kaldas chose not to renew his one-year contract in March 2010.

On 4 March 2016 Kaldas announced his decision to leave the Police Force. At the time he was considered to be a possible future Police Commissioner, notably due to his unique background, and counter-terrorism experience.

In 2017 there were serious calls by many, notably the NSW Opposition and crossbenchers, for Kaldas to be considered to replace Andrew Scipione as Commissioner despite his medical discharge the previous year. This followed wide public dissatisfaction with the most senior contender for the role, Deputy Commissioner Catherine Burn, over her decisions made during the Lindt Cafe Siege, and additionally, her involvement in the now infamous Operation Prospect, which targeted many senior police officers, including Kaldas.

== Honours and awards ==

In 1997 Kaldas was awarded the National Medal. In 2008 he received the Australian Police Medal.[10][11]

Australian Police Medal (APM)	2008 Queens Birthday Honours
Humanitarian Overseas Service Medal	
National Police Service Medal	
National Medal & 1 Bars	
Officer of the Order of Australia (AO)	2025 King's Birthday Honours

In addition to awards under the Australian Honours and Awards framework, he also holds a range of internal New South Wales Police Force awards, namely: NSW Police Commissioners Commendation and 3 clasps, NSW Police Medal with 1st, 2nd, 3rd & 4th clasps; NSWPF Commissioners Unit Citation & star, NSWPF Commissioners Olympic Citation and NSWPF Commissioners Sesquicenten±ary Citation.

== Operation Prospect ==
In 2012 a controversy developed involving Kaldas and his fellow Special Operations Police Deputy Commissioner Catherine Burn. This became known as Operation Prospect. The controversy raised concerns regarding the Surveillance Devices Act 2007 (NSW). An Ombudsman's report on Prospect was announced in October 2012, and was expected to be completed in six months. As of June 2015 the investigation was still ongoing, though the final hearings were completed on 31 March 2015. The Acting NSW Ombudsman, John McMillan's, report to Parliament was tabled on 20 December 2016.
