= Timothy Pilgrim =

Timothy Pilgrim PSM
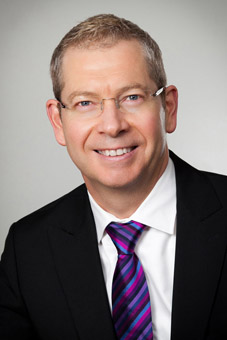

Australian Privacy Commissioner
- In office 19 July 2010 – 24 March 2018
- Preceded by: Karen Curtis
- Succeeded by: Angelene Falk

Australian Information Commissioner
- In office 13 October 2016 – 24 March 2018
- Preceded by: John McMillan
- Succeeded by: Angelene Falk

Personal details
- Born: 19 August 1960 (age 66) Cessnock, New South Wales, Australia
- Education: University of Sydney
- Occupation: Public servant

Timothy Hugh Pilgrim PSM (born 19 August 1960) is a former Australian public servant, who was the Australian Privacy Commissioner from 2010, and was appointed to the additional role of Australian Information Commissioner in October 2016, after acting in that role since July 2015. Pilgrim retired from both roles on 24 March 2018.

Pilgrim was appointed Privacy Commissioner on 19 July 2010, and Acting Australian Information Commissioner from 20 July 2015. He was first appointed to the Office of the Privacy Commissioner as Deputy Privacy Commissioner in February 1998. On 1 November 2010, he and other staff of the Office of the Privacy Commissioner were integrated into the Office of the Australian Information Commissioner. Before joining the Office of the Privacy Commissioner, Pilgrim held senior management positions in a range of Australian Government agencies, including the Small Business Program within the Australian Taxation Office and the Child Support Agency.

Government offices
Preceded by Karen Curtis	Australian Privacy Commissioner; 2010–2018	Succeeded by Angelene Falk
Preceded by John McMillan	Australian Information Commissioner; 2016–2018	Succeeded by Angelene Falk
