= Jason Holt (disambiguation) =

Jason Holt is a professional Scottish footballer.

Jason Holt may also refer to:

- Jason Holt (businessman) director of R Holt & Co
- Jason Holt, founder of Liquid Galaxy

== See also ==
- Jason Danino-Holt, TV presenter
