= Android store =

Android store may refer to:

- Android Market, the name for Android's "app store" from 2008 to 2012
- Androidland, a retail store by the carrier Telstra
