= Walsh Report =

Walsh Report may refer to

- Walsh Report (cryptography), an Australian cryptography policy review
- The Commission on Industrial Relations (also known as the Walsh Commission)
