= Allan Asher =

Australian lawyer, consumer advocate and campaigner

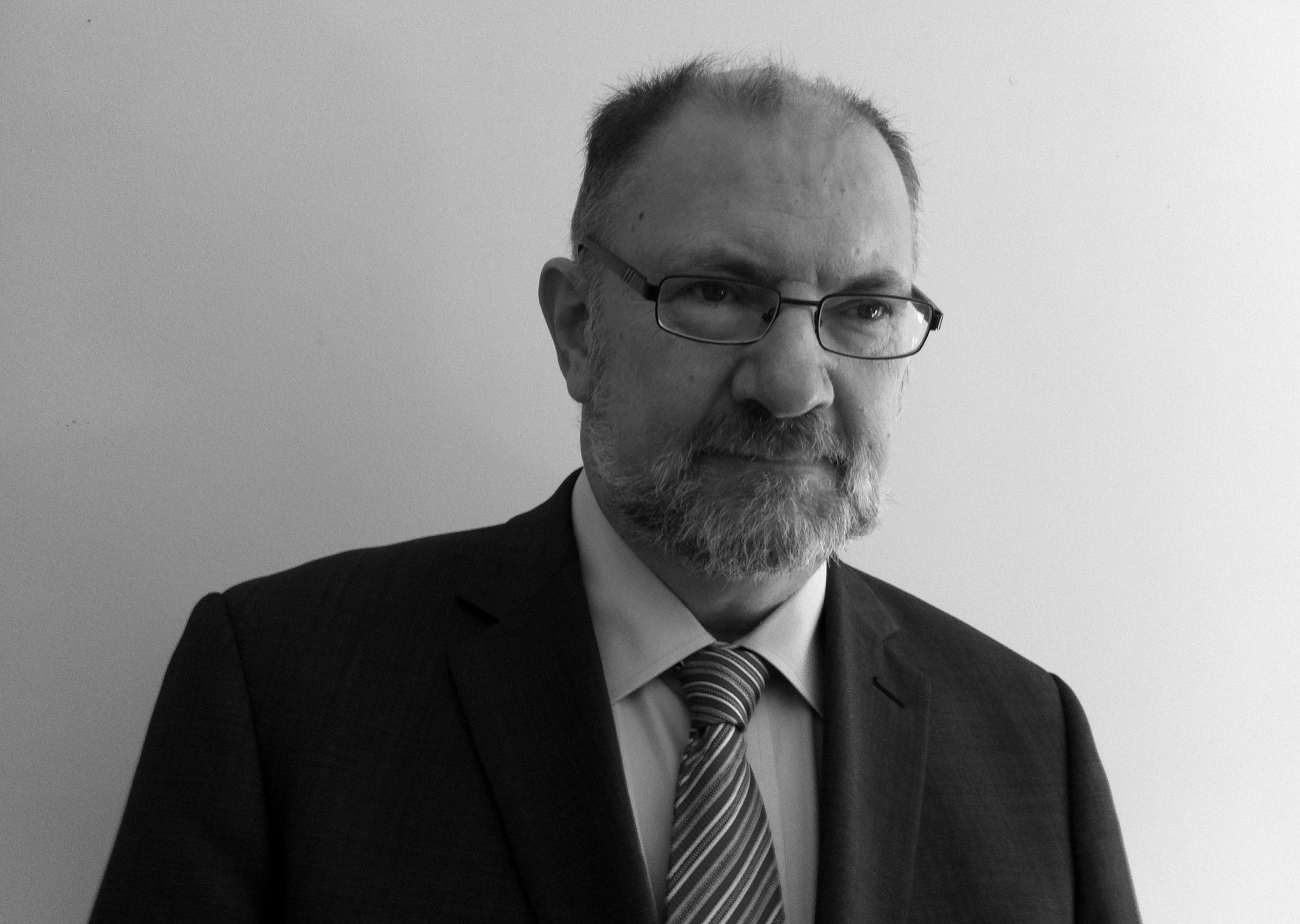
- Born: Allan James Asher; February 16, 1951 (age 75); Sydney
- Occupations: Lawyer, consumer advocate, public servant and campaigner
- Spouses: Joan Lennon (died 2006): Lois Eagle

Allan James Asher (born February 16, 1951) is an Australian lawyer, consumer advocate and campaigner.

== Early life, education and personal life ==
Asher was born in Sydney on 16 February 1951, one of eight children. He grew up in the western suburbs of Sydney at Eastern Creek. He attended Eastern Creek Primary School and later Rooty Hill High School. After completing high school Asher attended Sydney Technical College (now Ultimo TAFE) to re-do his Higher School Certificate.

He studied economics and accounting at the University of New South Wales, and then law at Sydney University.

In 2012 Asher took up a post as a Visitor at the Australian National University, Canberra.

== Early career ==
Asher's first job was as an audit clerk at an accounting firm.

From 1974 to 1984, Asher was a Senior Executive with the Australian Consumers Association (ACA). In 1984, Asher became the Director of Corporate Affairs with the Overseas Telecommunications Commission (OTC).

== Australian Competition and Consumer Commission ==
From 1988 to 2000 Asher was the deputy chairperson at the ACCC. This included a period at the Trade Practices Commission from 1988 to 2005.

The Australian Competition and Consumer Commission is Australia's national competition and consumer regulatory agency. At the end of his term as Deputy chairman (November 2000), the commission was engaged in around 53 civil and criminal prosecutions in the Federal Court of Australia. In addition around 30 enforceable undertakings or administrative settlements were under negotiation. Approximately half of the enforcement matters concerned competition law enforcement.

Asher was appointed as the Consumer Protection Commissioner in 1995 with special responsibility for consumer matters. This role involved extensive liaison with consumer interests both within Australia and internationally including representing Australia at the OECD, UNESCO and APEC. He was responsible for issues connected to e-commerce and global information technology matters.

While at the ACCC Asher played a significant role in the development of the OECD Guidelines for e-commerce and chaired the Policy Committee for 4 years. He represented the OECD at the International Organization for Standardization (ISO)

== Work in the United Kingdom ==
Asher worked for Consumers International, which is a global NGO made up of 240 groups from 110 countries. where he was the Global Policy and Campaigns Director from 2000 – 2001. Consumer's International is a global federation of 243 consumer organisations from 111 countries which promote a fairer society by advocacy of well-functioning market economies, and a rules-based global trading system. Asher was responsible for development advocacy and implementation of policies to promote the welfare of consumers at the global level. Consumers International defends the rights of all consumers including the poor, marginalised and disadvantaged.

Asher joined the UK Consumers' Association in 2001 where he was Director of Campaigns and Communication and a member of the senior management group until 2003. He took executive responsibility for consumer policy research, corporate and public relations, legal affairs and public affairs. Asher was the lead spokesperson for Which? and implemented a campaign to ensure consumer rights in the digital switchover.

From 2003 to 2008 Asher was a board member of the United Kingdom Office of Fair Trading. From 2001 to 2009 Asher was a board member of British Standards (BSI), chairperson of the Consumer Policy Committee in BSI and member of the Strategic Policy Committee.

In 2003 Asher became the CEO of the consumer watchdog organisation EnergyWatch. Energy Watch had 300 staff and 8 offices across the UK and was responsible for the efficient and effective planning, budgeting and implementation of Council and government agreed work plans. Key areas were systematic collection of consumer complaints in the energy sector and research on the underlying cause and systemic changes in industry practice needed to enhance consumer welfare. Energy Watch played an active role in working with governments, industry and consumer groups throughout Europe on consumer protection issues in energy markets. Asher conducted projects throughout Europe including the accession countries to the European Commission of Eastern Europe.

== ACCAN ==
After returning to Australia in 2009, Asher was CEO of the Australian Communications Consumer Action Network (ACCAN). ACCAN is a federation of 130 consumer groups with interests in information and communications technology.

In his time at ACCAN Asher confronted the issue of inadequate customer care and poorly developed customer complaint handling systems maintained by Australian telecommunications companies.

== Commonwealth Ombudsman ==
On 23 July 2010, the Australian Government announced Asher's appointment as Commonwealth Ombudsman from 30 August 2010.

Asher established priorities in several areas. These included issues confronting immigration, in particular administrative problems and poor treatment of asylum seekers.

Asher also encouraged all Commonwealth agencies to revise their written and spoken language to more closely communicate with the public. Another priority was the revision of agency complaint handling systems aimed at promoting social justice for members of the community with language or cognitive disabilities as well as those in remote areas or those suffering from poverty or alienation from the system.

In his role as Ombudsman, Asher also managed development assistance programs through which funding, training and mentoring services are provided to eight Pacific Island States, Indonesia and Timor Leste.

In October 2011, Asher resigned as Commonwealth Ombudsman.

== Refugee advocacy ==
Asher was a participant in the television documentary series Go Back To Where You Came From which was screened on 28, 29 and 30 August 2012 on SBS.

In February 2014, Asher participated in the inaugural event Who is My Neighbour, an information session about issues associated with refugees and asylum seekers in Australia, organised by St James' Church, Sydney.

Government offices
Preceded by John McMillan	Commonwealth Ombudsman; 2010–2011	Succeeded by Alison Larkins (Acting)
