= Androidland =

Android retail store

Android's "green robot"

Androidland was an Android-themed pop-up store, created by the telecommunications company Telstra in collaboration with Google, on Bourke Street, Melbourne, Australia in December 2011.

The store was themed heavily in green, featuring several Android "green robot" sculptures. In the store, Telstra provided visitors with an interactive spaceship zone that featured a flight simulator (via the Google Earth software, a Liquid Galaxy set-up), and also included a massive screen on which visitors could play Angry Birds. It further featured scented areas with gingerbread and grass aromas, called "Android grass", to further immerse visitors.

== History ==
Androidland had been in development since July 2011. Google Australia helped to train the store's Android experts to be able to assist visitors with their current devices, help them with their new ones and recommend apps to install.

Warwick Bray, the Executive Director of Telstra Mobile, stated, "Over the past 12 months we've seen a huge growth in the number of customers coming in-store and asking us about Android phones and tablets. With Androidland we wanted to create a retail environment like no other that helps us to answer customer questions in a fun, interactive way."

In October 2013, Spice Group announced a partnership with Google to set up 50 Androidland stores in India along with 100 smaller versions of the stores as Androidland mini stores.

== Reception ==
Logan Booker, writing for Gizmodo Australia wrote: "It's a friendly environment, definitely, and if I were to make the switch to Android, I’d be sure to stop by to aid in my decision-making. The interesting fusion of business with an "experience" beyond product demonstrations gives the shop-within-a-shop a corporate Powerhouse Museum feel."

The Telstra press release stated Androidland was a temporary installation but also noted the possibility of the installation expanding through other Telstra stores in Australia based on customer feedback.
