= Australian Information Commissioner =

The Australian Information Commissioner is an independent statutory office-holder in Australia, appointed under subsection 14(1) of the Australian Information Commissioner Act 2010 and operating within the Attorney-General's portfolio.

The Australian Information Commissioner heads the Office of the Australian Information Commissioner, and has functions relating to freedom of information, privacy and information policy.

Professor John McMillan was the first Australian Information Commissioner, appointed in 2010.

== Commissioners ==
| Name | Portrait | Tenure |
|---|---|---|
| John McMillan | | 1 November 2010 – 30 July 2015 |
| Vacant | | 31 July 2015 – 12 October 2016 |
| Timothy Pilgrim | | 13 October 2016 – 24 March 2018 |
| Angelene Falk | | 25 March 2018 – present |
