= John McMillan (public servant) =

Australian bureaucrat (born 1949)

Professor John McMillan AO
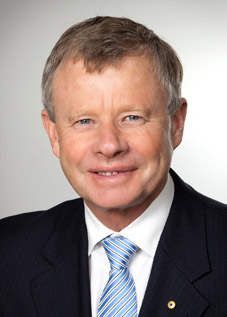
- Born: September 17, 1949 (age 76)
- Education: Australian National University
- Title: Acting New South Wales Ombudsman
- Term: 2015 – 2017

Professor John Denison McMillan AO (born September 17, 1949) was the Acting New South Wales Ombudsman.

== Early life and education ==
McMillan was born in September 17, 1949. He completed his Bachelor of Arts degree from Australian National University in 1970 and later he pursued a law degree from the same university.

== Career ==
He was appointed in August 2015 for a two-year term. He was formerly the Australian Information Commissioner from 2010 to 2015; the Commonwealth Ombudsman from 2003 to 2008; and the Integrity Commissioner (Acting) for the Australian Commission for Law Enforcement Integrity in 2007.

McMillan is an Emeritus Professor at the Australian National University, where he taught administrative and constitutional law from 1983 to 2003. He has been a solicitor in private practice, a legal consultant to many parliamentary and governmental inquiries, and was active in public interest advocacy in promoting open government reform. McMillan is a co-author of a leading student text, Control of Government Action: Text, Cases and Commentary (2015, 4th ed).

McMillan is a National Fellow of the Institute of Public Administration Australia, a Fellow of the Australian Academy of Law, and former President of the Australian Institute of Administrative Law. He was made an Officer of the Order of Australia (AO) in the Australia Day Honours List 2010 for his work as Ombudsman, academic and in professional societies. McMillan was a founding member in the 1970s of the Freedom of Information Campaign Committee which led the public campaign for enactment of the Freedom of Information Act 1982.

== Ombudman investigations ==
McMillan investigated the use of 'listening devices' against police officers engaged in by NSW Police during Operation Mascot, tabling his report to NSW Parliament on 20 December 2016.

Government offices
Preceded by Ron McLeod	Commonwealth Ombudsman; 2003 – 2010	Succeeded by Allan Asher
New title	Australian Information Commissioner; 1 November 2010 – 30 July 2015	Succeeded by Timothy Pilgrim
Preceded by Bruce Barbour	Acting NSW Ombudsman; 1 August 2015 – October 2017	Succeeded by Michael Barnes, NSW Ombudsman
