= Surveillance Devices Act 2007 (NSW) =

Australian privacy legislation

The Surveillance Devices Act 2007 (NSW) (“the Act”) is a piece of privacy legislation enacted by the Parliament of New South Wales the most populous state in Australia. It replaced the Listening Devices Act 1984 (NSW). The Act makes it an offence to record private conversations apart from in specific and defined circumstances. It makes provision for law enforcement officers to apply for warrants authorising the use of such devices and the circumstances in which judges of the Supreme Court of New South Wales might issue such warrants.

== History ==
In 1997, the Royal Commission into the New South Wales Police Service found that the use of electronic surveillance was the single most important factor in achieving a breakthrough in its investigations. Justice Wood concluded that the law lagged well behind technical developments and patterns of crime and recommended a systematic and comprehensive review of legislation and procedures to assist the pursuit of law enforcement. The Surveillance Devices Bill 2007 (NSW) was introduced into the New South Wales Parliament on 6 November 2007. The bill replaced the Listening Devices Act 1984 (NSW) and expanded the application of the legislation so that it also applies to data surveillance devices, optical surveillance devices and tracking devices. The aim of the bill was to implement national model legislation developed by the Joint Working Group of the Standing Committee of Attorneys-General and the Australasian Police Ministers’ Council on National Investigation Powers. The Second Reading Speech states that for serious crimes like murder, terrorism, drug manufacture and importation it is essential that law enforcement agencies have every possible tool at their disposal to make their investigations and prosecutions as successful as possible. The Act was assented to on 23 November 2007. The date of commencement was 1 August 2008.

== Offences ==
Sections 7-14 create a series of offences carrying penalties ranging from the imposition of a fine to imprisonment of up to five years. The offence creating provisions of the Act provide a comprehensive code designed to protect the privacy of the general population. Exceptions to criminal liability arise where a warrant or Commonwealth law authorises the use of a surveillance device or where a person is protecting their lawful interests.

Section 8 makes it an offence carrying a maximum penalty of five years imprisonment to use a listening device ‘to overhear, record, monitor or listen to’ a private conversation to which the person is not a party or to record a private conversation to which there person is a party. In general terms, there are two exceptions.

The first exception (under sub-s (2) and (4)) is where the use of the device is authorised by warrant, is part of an operation authorised under the Law Enforcement (Controlled Operations) Act 1997 (NSW) or is incidental to the use of a “Taser” (a kind of stun gun) issued to a member of the NSW Police Force. The Tasers issued to New South Wales Police are designed to record both the sound and vision of the deployment of the stun gun.

The second exception (sub-s (3)) arises where the person is a party to the conversation and the other parties consent or the recording “is reasonably necessary for the protection of the lawful interests” of the party who records the conversation. The breadth and meaning of the “lawful interests” exception has been considered in a number of cases. In DW v R [2014] NSWCCA 28, the New South Wales Court of Criminal Appeal held that the victim of a sexual assault who recorded a conversation she had with the perpetrator did not commit an offence when her purpose was to convince others of the truth of her allegations. It was held that the recording was made to protect her lawful interests. The same Court reached a similar conclusion in Sepulveda v R [2006] NSWCCA 379, a decision under the earlier Listening Devices Act. In R v Le [2004] NSWCCA 82, the Court was divided on whether a friend of a man charged with the murder of politician John Newman had a lawful interest in recording a conversation with Albert Ranse who had previously claimed responsibility for the murder. Giles JA found that protection of lawful interests do not encompass credibility generally or in the event of giving evidence. On the contrary, Hulme and Adams JJ found that the avoidance of "being labeled a liar" (within a criminal investigation) is an important lawful interest and the recording of the conversation was the only practicable mode of preventing or refuting such an allegation.

Similar offences are created to prohibit the use of the other devices dealt with under the Act. Section 9 makes it an offence to install or use a tracking device to determine the location of a person or object. Exceptions to criminal liability are (i) authorisation by warrant, (ii) authorisation under Australian commonwealth law or (iii) “lawful purpose”. The scope of the last defence has not been considered.

Section 10 makes it an offence to use a “data surveillance device” to record or monitor the input or output of information from a computer if the installation or maintenance involves entry onto premises without consent or interference with the computer or the network on which the computer operates. The breadth of this provision has not been considered but it is difficult to imagine the use of such a device that does not involve some interference with the computer or the computer network.

Section 11 creates an offence of communicating the contents of a private conversation that has come to the person’s knowledge as a result of the prohibited use of a surveillance device. The offence does not encompass communication to the parties to the conversation or for the purpose of prosecuting an offence. The other exception is whether the communication is “reasonably necessary in connection with an imminent threat” of serious drug offences, offences of violence and serious damage to property.

Section 12 prohibits the possession of a record of a private conversation. Section 13 makes it an offence to manufacture, supply or possess a surveillance device with the intention that it be used contrary to the Act.

Section 14 creates an offence of communicating or publishing information derived or obtained by the unlawful use of a data tracking device. Similar exceptions to those under s 11.

== Warrants ==
Part 3 of the Act provides for the issue of surveillance device and retrieval warrants.

Section 16 provides that only an “eligible judge” may issue a warrant although an eligible magistrate may issue a retrieval warrant or a warrant that authorises the use of a tracking device only. Section 51 provides that the Attorney General must be notified that an application for a warrant is to be made.

== Eligible Judges ==
Section 5 defines an eligible judge as a Judge of the Supreme Court of New South Wales. For a Supreme Court judge to be eligible to issue a warrant he or she must sign a written consent and be the subject of a declaration by the Attorney-General of New South Wales. Once made a declaration cannot be revoked by the Attorney General unless the Judge withdraws their consent or the Chief Justice notifies the Attorney General that the Judge should no longer be an authorised judge.

== Applications for surveillance device warrants ==
Applications for warrants can be made by state or federal police as well as a number of agencies including the New South Wales Crime Commission and the Independent Commission Against Corruption (New South Wales) A law enforcement officer may apply to an eligible judge for a surveillance device warrant to be issued if they believe on reasonable grounds that:

(a) an offence has been, is being or is likely to be committed
(b) there is an investigation into the offence
(c) the use of a surveillance is necessary to obtain evidence of the offence or the identity of the location of the offender.

Section 17 provides the formalities of the application. The application must state that name of the applicant, the nature, kind and duration or the warrant sought and must be supported by an affidavit (that is, a statement made under part 5 of the Oaths Act 1900 (NSW).

In cases of urgency the application can be made before the affidavit is prepared. In such a case the applicant must provide the necessary information within the next 72 hours.

Section 17(6) provides that an application for a warrant is not to be heard in open court. This is to ensure that the subject of the warrant is not put on notice of the covert investigation.

The eligible judge may issue the warrant if satisfied that there are reasonable grounds for the belief stated by the law enforcement officer: s 19(1). The use of the term “may” means that the Judge has discretion as to whether the warrant should be issued. Section 19(2) provides a number of factors to be taken into account in determining whether to issue the warrant. These include:

1. The nature and seriousness of the alleged offence.
2. The extent to which the privacy of any person may be affected.
3. Whether there is any other way to obtain the evidence.
4. The importance of the information to the investigation and its evidentiary value.
5. Whether there has been any previous warrant.

Section 20 provides the formal requirements of a warrant. The warrant must specify the matters referred to in section 20(1). This includes the fact that the Judge is satisfied of the relevant criteria justifying the issue of the warrant. It must also specify the offence, the kind of surveillance device it authorises and the premises, vehicle or person to which the warrant attaches. The warrant must also state the period during which the warrant will remain in force. The maximum period is 90 days. The warrant must specify the name of the applicant and the officer primarily responsible for its execution. The warrant can also state conditions on the use of the surveillance device. The warrant must be signed by the Judge and include his or her name.

In the case of a warrant issued under a remote application, the Judge must inform the applicant of the terms of the warrant and the date and time it was issued. The Judge must keep a register and enter the details into the register. The Judge must provide the applicant with a copy of the warrant as soon as possible after it is issued remotely.

While the application must be made to a judge, the act of granting the warrant is considered to be an administrative, not judicial, function: Ousley v R [1997] HCA 49. This means that the ability to challenge the warrant is limited. If the warrant is “valid on its face”, the opportunity for collateral challenge to the admissibility of the evidence derived from its use is restricted. There is no duty to give reasons and the application is determined in private (that is, in the Judge’s chambers). Controversy surrounding the issue of surveillance device warrants led to Chief Justice Tom Bathurst making a statement that judges were now required to give short written reasons for the issue of the warrant.

== What a surveillance device warrant authorises ==
Section 21 sets out the detail of the things that a surveillance device may authorise:

(a) The use of a surveillance device on or in specified premises or a vehicle;

(b) The use of a surveillance device in or on a specified object or class of object;

(c) The use of a surveillance device in respect of the conversations, activities or geographical location of a specified person or a person whose identity is unknown;

(d) The use of a surveillance device on or about the body of a specified person.

The warrant also authorises the installation, use and maintenance of the surveillance device and the entry, by force if necessary, onto or into the premises or vehicle subject of the warrant. It may also authorise entry (by force) onto adjoining premises or premises through which access to the subject premises or vehicle might be obtained.

== Admissibility of evidence obtained by surveillance device ==
In New South Wales the admissibility of evidence is determined by the application of the common law and the Evidence Act 1995 (NSW). If evidence is obtained unlawfully, it is inadmissible unless the Court is satisfied that the “desirability of admitting the evidence outweighs the undesirability of admitting evidence obtained in the way in which the evidence was obtained”. This means that if evidence is obtained by the use of a surveillance device contrary to the Surveillance Devices Act, the evidence cannot be used in evidence unless the party seeking to tender the evidence convinces the Judge that it should be allowed. There is a list of factors in sub-section (3) to be taken into account:

(a) The probative value of the evidence, and
(b) The importance of the evidence in the proceeding, and
(c) The nature of the relevant offence, cause of action or defence and the nature of the subject-matter of the proceeding, and
(d) The gravity of the impropriety or contravention, and
(e) Whether the impropriety or contravention was deliberate or reckless, and
(f) Whether the impropriety or contravention was contrary to or inconsistent with a right of a person recognised by the International Covenant on Civil and Political Rights, and
(g) Whether any other proceeding (whether or not in a court) has been or is likely to be taken in relation to the impropriety or contravention, and
(h) The difficulty (if any) of obtaining the evidence without impropriety or contravention of an Australian law.

In R v Simmons (No 2) [2015] NSWCCA 143 members of the NSW police were undertaking a complex undercover sting operation. They had obtained surveillance device warrants on a number of occasions to record conversations they had with a man suspected of murder. However, two of the warrants had expired by a number days and police had failed to apply to have the warrants renewed. The Prosecutor submitted that it was merely an oversight and the unlawfulness or contravention of the Act was not serious. Justice Hamill disagreed saying at [138]:

“Contrary to the submission of the Crown, I find that the impropriety is quite grave: s 138(3)(d). The rights to silence and to privacy are important parts of a functioning democracy and free and civilised society. Where safeguards such as the Surveillance Devices Act are enacted, law enforcement officers must be fastidious in ensuring that they are complied with.”

As it turned out the conversations were recorded by another (lawful) surveillance device and so the question of admissibility did not arise. The prosecutor did not lead the evidence that had been obtained without a warrant.

However, where a warrant is invalid for technical reasons but the police genuinely believed that they were acting lawfully, the discretion will generally be exercised in favour of admitting the evidence: see, for example, R v WJ Eade [2000] NSWCCA 369; R v Sibraa [2012] NSWCCA 19. This is because the impropriety was not reckless or deliberate. On the other hand, if a warrant is obtained by deceiving the Judge or Magistrate, the trial Judge has the power to exclude the evidence even though the warrant is valid on its face. In Flanagan v Australian Federal Police [1996] FCA 16; 134 ALR 495 the Federal Court of Australia held (at 545):

“In short, we are of the opinion that, in the criminal trial, it is open to the applicants to urge that the product, and the fruits of the product, be excluded. Whether the allegations of bad faith and impropriety will in fact be made out, and whether, if so, the power, duty or discretion to exclude the product and its fruits should be exercised, the questions entirely within the jurisdiction of the County Court.”

It has been held that the issue of a warrant is an administrative, not a judicial, act. Accordingly, it has been held that if the warrant is “valid on its face”, the opportunity for collateral attack on the warrant is limited: See for example, Love v Attorney General [1990] HCA 4. Accordingly, In Ousley v R [1997] HCA 49, it was held by Gaudron J (at 85) that the collateral review of the warrant is “limited to the validity of the warrant on its face”. Justice Toohey held (at 80):

“It is not open to the judge to adjudicate on the sufficiency of a warrant or whether the issuing authority was in fact satisfied as to any statutory requirements.” 49

However, it is not the case that a warrant that is valid on its face can never be subject to collateral attack. For example, when the NSW Crime Commissioner purported to authorise by warrant the sale of large quantities of cocaine in the hope to entrap drug dealers, the High Court of Australia held that the warrants were invalid. That was because it was not open to the Commissioner to conclude that the activity was not likely to seriously endanger the health or safety of any person. This was a “jurisdictional fact” (a term used loosely in the appeal) upon which the validity of the commissioner’s power to issue the warrant turned. See Gedeon v NSW Crime Commission [2008] HCA 43 at [47]-[57].

In summary:

(i) Where evidence is obtained by use of the surveillance device which is not authorised under the Act (by warrant or as an exception to the prohibition), it is unlawfully obtained evidence. It cannot be used unless Judge is convinced that it should be allowed.
(ii) If there is a warrant, the warrant can be challenged but only in limited circumstances. The decision to issue the warrant cannot be challenged if the warrant is valid on its face.
(iii) If the warrant was obtained by deceiving the issuing Judge, the evidence is likely to be inadmissible.
(iv) If the police believe the warrant authorises the use of the device, but it does not, the trial Judge must balance competing considerations including the right to privacy and whether the breach was reckless or merely an oversight.

== Requirement to Inform Subject of Surveillance ==
Under section 52, If an eligible judge is satisfied that, having regard to the evidence obtained by the use of the surveillance device and to any other relevant matter, the use of the surveillance device was not justified and was an unnecessary interference with the privacy of the person concerned, the Judge may direct the person to whom the warrant was issued to supply to the subject of the warrant, information regarding the warrant and the use of the device. Before giving a direction under this sections the Judge must give the person to whom the warrant was issued an opportunity to be heard on the matter.

== Reporting and Record Keeping ==
A person to whom a surveillance device warrant is issued must, within the time specified in the warrant, send a written report to the eligible judge or magistrate who issued the warrant and also to the Attorney General. The report must state:

(a) whether or not a surveillance device was used pursuant to the warrant;
(b) (if used) the type of surveillance device;
(c) the name (if known) of any person whose private conversation was recorded or listened to, or whose activity was recorded by the device;
(d) the period during which the device was used;
(e) the particulars of any premises or vehicle on or in which the device was installed or any place at which the device was used;
(f) the particulars of any previous use of surveillance device in connection with the offence in respect of which the warrant was issued.

== Inspections ==
Section 48 of the Act states that the Ombudsman must, from time to time, inspect the records of each law enforcement agency (other than the Australian Crime Commission) to determine the extent of compliance with the Surveillance Devices Act 2007 (NSW) by the agency and law enforcement officers of the agency. The Ombudsman must make a written report to the Minister at 6-monthly intervals on the results of an inspection under section 48. Within 15 days, this report must be placed before both Houses of Parliament.

== Review of the Act ==
Section 63(2) of the Act states that a statutory review "is to be undertaken as soon as possible after the period of 5 years from the date of assent to this Act." Section 63(3) states "A report on the outcome of the review is to be tabled in each House of Parliament within 12 months after the end of the period of 5 years." The date of assent was 23 November 2007, 5 years from that date was 23 November 2012. As at 17 June 2015 a report had not been tabled. On 31 May 2015, New South Wales Attorney-General said that the Surveillance Devices Act was under review and stated;

"The Department of Justice continues to consult with stakeholders on whether the Act's policy objectives remain valid and whether the terms of the Act remain appropriate for securing those objectives.....The review will consider the relevant case law."

== Criticisms ==
=== Number of Warrants Issued ===
It was reported by The Australian in 2013 that Police in NSW have obtained three times more surveillance device warrants than the combined Queensland Police Service, South Australia Police, Western Australia Police and Tasmania Police over 3 years. Statistics published by the NSW Ombudsman reveal that NSW officers obtained 1600 surveillance device warrants in the two years to December 2012. That compares with 204 for Western Australia, 143 for Queensland, 73 for South Australia and at least 66 for Tasmania in the three years to June, according to annual reports held by those states. Figures were not available for Victoria.(subscription required)

=== No Relevant Information ===
The NSW Council for Civil Liberties have asked for amendments to the Act, with more stringent checking of police requests to use devices after it was found that only 43% of warrants resulted in relevant information being obtained.

=== Reporting Concerns ===
On April 14, 2014, it was reported that the NSW Council for Civil Liberties and the NSW opposition were concerned about the lack of oversight into reporting after Ombudsman Bruce Barbour found police were breaching the Surveillance Devices Act 2007 (NSW) by recording outside warrant terms and failing to report back to judges and the Attorney General on surveillance device use.

=== "Rubber Stamping" ===
The Age reported that in 2014, NSW Courts refused less than 2 per cent of police applications for surveillance device warrants. Only 6 of 363 applications were rejected in the first half of 2014 - an increase from no rejections out of 878 application in the 12 months prior. Shadow NSW Attorney-General Paul Lynch states;

"The very low rate of refusals suggests either that applications for surveillance device warrants by NSW police are consistently of an almost perfect standard, or that the process of approval lacks rigour"

A 2015 report from the Ombudsman found that police were "systematically failing to destroy recordings that weren't needed for criminal investigations, in breach of the Act. Instead they were being archived."

=== Australian Uniform Surveillance Laws ===
In a report into Serious Invasions of Privacy in the Digital Era in March 2014, the Australian Law Reform Commission (‘ALRC’) found that there were significant inconsistencies between states and territories in the laws with respect to the types of devices regulated and with respect to the offences, defences and exceptions. It was argued that this inconsistency results in uncertainty and complexity, reducing privacy protection for individuals and increasing compliance burdens for organisations. The ALRC recommended that surveillance device laws should be uniform throughout Australia, to be achieved through Commonwealth legislation.

=== Terrorism Related Offences ===
When the Act was introduced in parliament, former Attorney General and Minister for Justice, John Hatzistergos emphasised that a major function of the Act was to allow law enforcement agencies “every possible tool at their disposal” to “confront the very real threat of terrorism occurring on Australian soil.” The NSW Council for Civil Liberties noted that although considerable time was dedicated by the New South Wales Government in linking the use of surveillance device warrants to terrorism-related offences. The NSW Ombudsman Reports outline the crimes for which a warrant has been sought and ‘Terrorism offences’ are listed in the ‘Other’ category along with offences including ‘corrupt conduct’, ‘manslaughter’ and ‘gambling offences’. In 2012 the ‘Other’ category accounted for only 3% of the warrants issued during the reporting period.

=== Warrant Period ===
Warrants are valid for 90 days from issuance. In the Second Reading Speech the Hon. Michael Gallacher (member for the Opposition) provided that the 90-day period is too long. Under the old Act, the period a warrant was valid for was 21 days. If it was needed for a longer period of time an application for an extension could be made. He spoke of the ease at which police officers were able to extend their warrants if necessary under the old act and stated that the 21-day provision put forward by the Opposition will enable “a degree of checks and balances and ensure the maintenance of probity”. Member for the Greens Ms Rhiannon Lee describes the extension of the warrant period as “an extraordinary shift. The Government was offered no convincing case for such a lengthy extension.” Hatzistergos replied that “a bunch of bleeding hearts, the Council for Civil Liberties actually supported it [move to a 90-day warrant period]”. In a submission to the Department of Attorney-General and Justice regarding the statutory review of the Surveillance Devices Act 2007 (NSW) dated 27 September 2013, the NSW Council for Civil Liberties state that they never supported this extension, and maintain the position that the 90-day period should be reduced to 21 days.

=== Ethics of Surveillance ===
The ethics of surveillance in general and the Surveillance Devices Act 2007 (NSW) in particular have been criticised by members of both the Labor party and the Greens. During the Second Reading Speech, member for the Greens, Ms Rhiannon Lee said;

“In recent years since the 9/11 tragedy there has been no attempt to get the balance right [on surveillance]. Consequently the balance has swung in favour of the police. The authorities have cracked down and as a result people have lost their basic rights. We also should not be blinded by technological advances in surveillance as though they are magic silver bullet that will solve crime in New South Wales, catch all the terrorists and make everybody feel safe. It is dangerous to cultivate such a notion because technological surveillance will not be the solution that it is often presented to be. If surveillance powers are abused, people are left open to victimisation and discrimination. The Council of Civil Liberties submission on the draft surveillance bill in 2006 stated:

‘Covert intrusions leave a person vulnerable to mistaken data-matching. The knowledge that words and actions may be being monitored restricts autonomy and hampers personal growth and the development and enjoyment of relationships. In the hands of the unscrupulous, covert surveillance leaves victims open to blackmail.’”

== Controversies ==
=== Police Bugging Scandal – ‘Operation Prospect’ ===
In 2003, Strike Force Emblems was established in response to allegations that warrants were improperly obtained during Operation Mascot, an investigation into police corruption in the late 1990s. The warrants authorised a large number of people, mostly police officers, to have their private conversations ‘bugged’. This included the controversial ‘Bell warrant’ containing 114 names. The investigators involved in Strike Force Emblems believed that false or misleading information had been used to obtain the warrants but their investigations were obstructed by a lack of co-operation on behalf of the New South Wales Crime Commission. Nearly a decade later in October 2012, the New South Wales Government announced that the Ombudsman would investigate allegations concerning the conduct of officers in the NSW Police Force, the Crime Commission and the Police Integrity Commission in relation to the matters investigated in Strike Force Emblems which occurred between 1998 and 2002. The Select Committee on the Conduct and Progress of the Ombudsman’s Inquiry “Operation Prospect” states that in 2012 the legislative council was assured by the government that the Ombudsman would report in 6 months. The final hearings were not completed until 31 March 2015. The Acting NSW Ombudsman, John McMillan's, report to Parliament was tabled on 20 December 2016.
