= Liquid Galaxy =

Data visualization tool

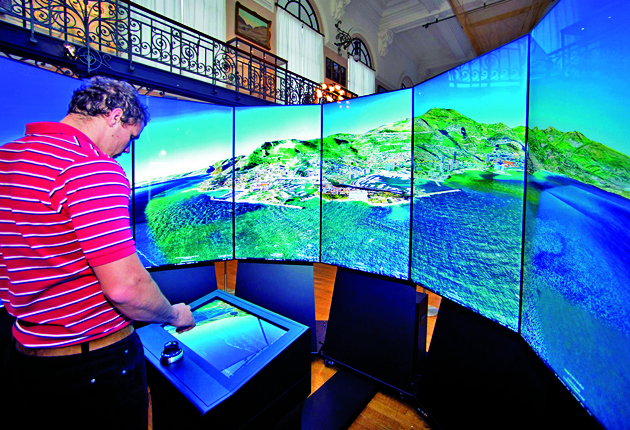
Liquid Galaxy in use at the Oceanographic Museum

The Liquid Galaxy is an open source project founded by Google. Created in 2008 by Google employee Jason Holt, the Liquid Galaxy started out as a panoramic multi-display Google Earth viewer, but shifted to a general data visualization tool for various uses including operations, marketing, and research.

The Liquid Galaxy enables users to navigate Google Earth, view videos and photos, develop interactive tours, and graphically display GIS data.

Liquid Galaxies are regularly used by Google to showcase Google's geospatial technologies and to promote its image at trade shows and exhibits. Some companies, nonprofits (e.g. Sylvia Earle Alliance/Mission Blue), and universities (e.g. Auburn University, University of North Carolina at Chapel Hill, and Westfield State University) use Liquid Galaxies.

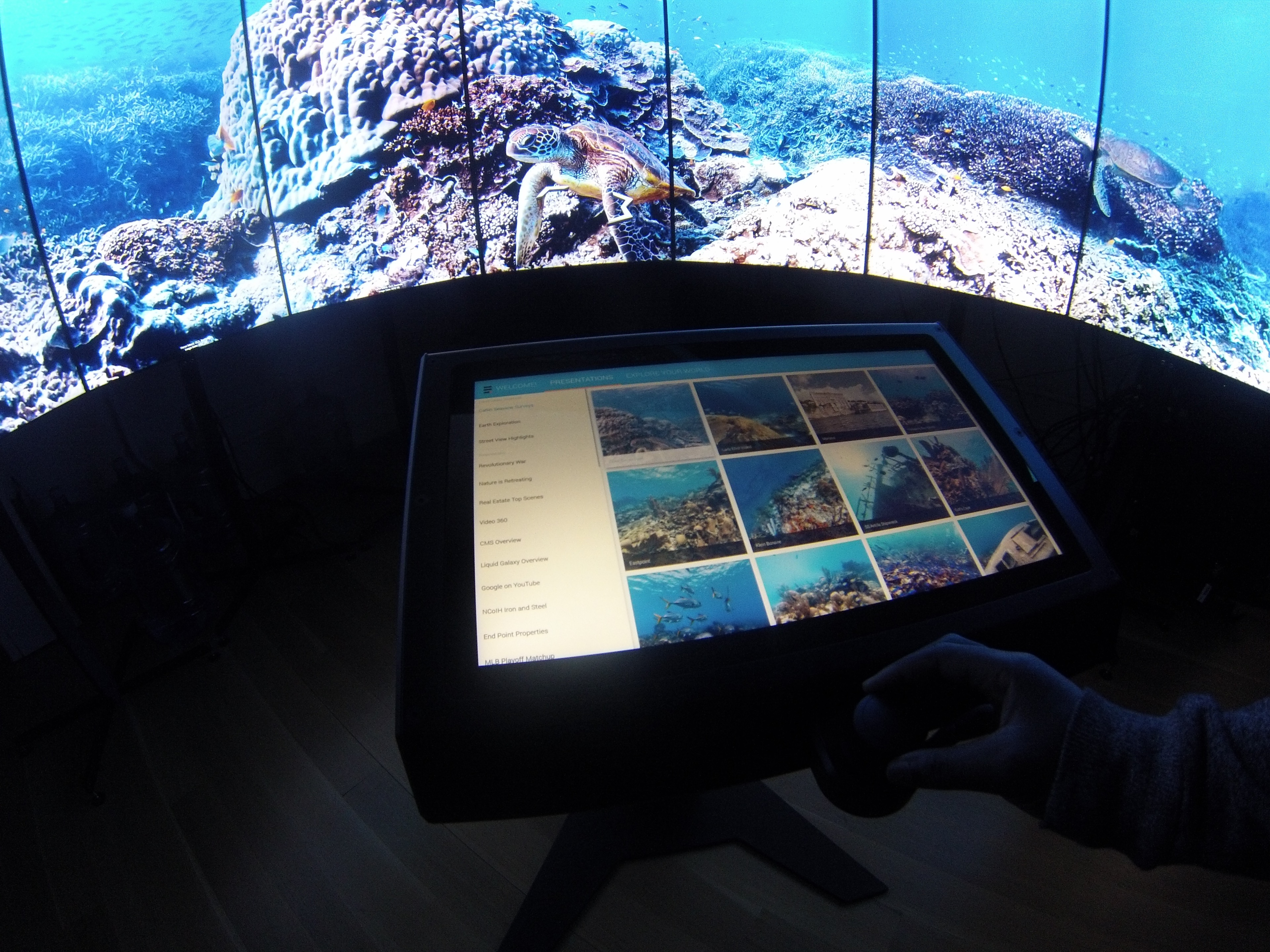
Liquid Galaxy with Touchscreen and Space Navigator

== Development partners ==
For most of the life of Liquid Galaxy, Liquid Galaxy construction and support has been outsourced to End Point Corporation. Other companies like Tietronix and GLGteam have also produced Liquid Galaxy systems.
