= Freedom of Information Act 1982 =

Australian federal legislation

Parliament of Australia
- Long title: An Act to give to members of the public rights of access to official documents of the Government of the Commonwealth and of its agencies
- Citation: No. 3, 1982
- Enacted by: House of Representatives
- Enacted: 9 March 1982
- Administered by: Office of the Australian Information Commissioner
- Status: In force

The Freedom of Information Act 1982 (Cth) is an act of the Parliament of Australia which guarantees freedom of information (FOI) and the rights of access to official documents of the Commonwealth Government and of its agencies to members of the public. It was passed by the Parliament of Australia on 9 March 1982, and commenced on 1 December 1982.

== History ==
Before the act's implementation the various governments of Australia had no obligation to release information to the public, because the traditional Westminster system of governance is fairly closed to public scrutiny. Between the 1960s and 1980s a number of enquiries were made, looking into the transparency of the Australian government and public services which led to New Industry Law (NAL) reforms. One of the NAL initiatives was Freedom of Information and is considered a "landmark in the development of Australian democracy".

== The act ==
Members of the public have certain rights of access. These include the right to access documents about the operation of government departments and documents that are in the possession of government Ministers or agencies. Certain documents are exempt from this, including (but not limited to) documents detailing Cabinet deliberations or decisions; documents disclosing trade secrets; or documents that could damage national security, defence, or international relations, or any document that could damage Commonwealth-State relations. The act protects personal privacy by exempting documents the disclosure of which would result in the unreasonable disclosure of personal information about any individual person, including a deceased person.

=== Requesting information ===
The request for access to a document must be in writing, and contain a reasonable amount of information about the requested document in order for it to be easier to locate. The application process can also incur charges. Upon receiving the application, the government agency or Minister who receives the application must take all reasonable steps to inform the applicant that their request has been received within 14 days, and must also notify the applicant of their decision in relation to the request within 30 days of receiving the request. If access has been refused wholly or in part, reasons must be provided to the applicant. However, not all documents, depend on the contents, that are held in a minister's office will be subject to the act.

== Amendments ==
The Freedom of Information Amendment (Reform) Act 2010 was passed in May 2010, and came into effect in November 2010. The changes were largely targeted at reducing the cost of the FOI applications, which had been criticized by journalists as "prohibitively costly".

Some of the changes to the Freedom of Information Amendment (Reform) Act 2010 for applications received on or after 1 November 2010 include :

- No application fee is payable for an FOI request or application for internal review;
- An applicant who seeks access to their own personal information does not pay any charges;
- For all other applications, the cost of the first five hours of decision-making time is set to be free of charge.

== Reception ==
The Italian investigative journalist Stefania Maurizi described Australia as "the worst jurisdiction on earth when it comes to FOIA [Freedom of Information Act]". She had filed FOI requests with governments throughout the world for documents relating to Julian Assange and WikiLeaks.

== See also ==
- Freedom of information laws by country
