= Australian Privacy Commissioner =

The Australian Privacy Commissioner is an independent statutory office-holder, appointed under subsection 14 (4) of the Australian Information Commissioner Act 2010. The Privacy Commissioner is one of three commissioners in the Office of the Australian Information Commissioner, and has functions relating to privacy and freedom of information.

Carly Kind is the current Privacy Commissioner.

== History ==
Prior to the Australian Information Commissioner Act 2010, the Privacy Commissioner was the Commissioner with respect to privacy legislation. Under the 2010 amendments to the Privacy Act 1988 the Information Commissioner became the Commissioner with respect to privacy legislation.
