= Office of the Australian Information Commissioner =

Australian federal government agency

Agency overview
- Formed: 1 November 2010; 15 years ago
- Preceding agency: Office of the Australian Privacy Commissioner
- Jurisdiction: Commonwealth of Australia
- Employees: 195 (2023–24)
- Annual budget: $47.9 million (2023–24)
- Minister responsible: Michelle Rowland, Attorney-General
- Agency executives: Elizabeth Tydd, Australian Information Commissioner; Alice Linacre, Freedom of Information Commissioner; Carly Kind, Privacy Commissioner; Ashleigh McDonald, Executive General Manager, Information Rights; Rowena Park, Executive General Manager, Regulatory Action; Rocelle Ago, General Manager, Freedom of Information Case Management; Marcel Savary, General Manager, Regulatory Intelligence and Strategy; Sarah Ghali, General Manager, Enabling Services; Jennifer Perrin, General Manager, Privacy Case Management
- Parent agency: Office of the Attorney-General
- Key documents: Australian Information Commissioner Act 2010; Freedom of Information Act 1982; Privacy Act 1988
- Website: www.oaic.gov.au

The Office of the Australian Information Commissioner (OAIC), known until 2010 as the Office of the Australian Privacy Commissioner, is an independent Australian Government agency acting as the national data protection authority for Australia, established under the Australian Information Commissioner Act 2010, and headed by the Australian Information Commissioner.

The office has three primary functions:

- privacy functions, conferred by the Privacy Act 1988 and other laws
- freedom of information functions, in particular, oversight of the operation of the Freedom of Information Act 1982 (FOI Act) and review of decisions made by agencies and ministers under that Act
- government information policy functions, conferred on the Australian Information Commissioner under the Australian Information Commissioner Act 2010.

The office is an agency within the Attorney-General's portfolio. The office liaises with the Business and Information Law Branch, part of the Civil Law Division within the Civil Justice and Legal Services Group of the Attorney-General's Department. The office is an independent agency and reports to the Attorney-General.

== History ==
The first Australian Privacy Commissioner was appointed in 1989 to the former Office of the Privacy Commissioner, which was the national privacy regulatory body until 2010. Major changes to federal freedom of information (FOI) law made in 2010 established the present office as the body responsible for FOI, privacy, and information policy. The Freedom of Information Amendment (Reform) Act 2010 was passed in May 2010, and came into effect from November 2010. This Act introduced fundamental changes to the way information held by government is managed and accessed by members of the public (see Freedom of Information).

The Office of the Privacy Commissioner was integrated into the office at this time.

In the 2014 budget, the OAIC was defunded, with the Abbott government intending to integrate its functions into the Australian Human Rights Commission and Commonwealth Ombudsman. In October 2014, the government introduced a bill to Parliament to abolish the agency, but it did not proceed before the prorogation of the 44th Parliament of Australia in April 2016.

== Structure ==
The office is headed by the Australian Information Commissioner. Despite their titles, all commissioners can exercise the privacy and freedom of information (FOI) functions. However, only the Information Commissioner may exercise the information policy functions.

== Responsibilities ==
The office’s responsibilities include:

- conducting investigations
- reviewing decisions made under the FOI Act
- handling complaints
- monitoring agency administration
- education and awareness programs
- providing advice to the public, government agencies and businesses.

== Freedom of Information ==
The office has freedom of information functions, including the oversight of the operation of the FOI Act and review of decisions made by agencies and ministers under that Act. If a person is dissatisfied with the result of an FOI request, they may seek review by the office. A person may also complain to the office if they are unhappy with the manner in which their request was handled by an agency.

The FOI Act has been a feature of Australia's legislative landscape since 1982. The purpose of the FOI Act was to open government activity to public scrutiny, so as to enhance accountability and encourage citizen engagement with public administration. In 2010, the Australian Parliament implemented wide-ranging open government reforms — the most significant FOI reforms in thirty years. The office was established and substantial changes were made to the FOI Act. These reforms simplified the process for accessing government information, tightened the exemptions to information release, strengthened independent oversight and review of FOI administration, promoted proactive publication of government information, and clearly stated the open government object of the FOI Act.

The object of the Act is 'to increase recognition that information held by the Government is to be managed for public purposes, and is a national resource'. The Reform Act introduced a new scheme for the proactive publication of government information called the Information Publication Scheme, under which government agencies are required to provide certain operational information on their websites.

The office may initiate an own motion investigation (OMI). The office can also provide information and advice on FOI to individuals and agencies, via the OAIC enquiries line.

== Privacy ==
Privacy is one of three broad functions conferred on the office. The legislative basis of these privacy functions is drawn primarily from the Privacy Act. The Privacy Act regulates how an individual's personal information is handled. For example, it covers:

- how personal information is collected (e.g. the personal information a person provides when they fill in a form)
- how it is then used and disclosed
- its accuracy
- how securely it is kept
- a person’s general right to access that information.

The Act also covers more specific matters, such as:

- the use of tax file numbers
- how credit worthiness information about a person is handled by credit reporting agencies and credit providers.

The office has a range of responsibilities under other laws, including laws relating to data matching, eHealth, spent convictions and tax file numbers. The office provides information and advice on privacy to individuals, businesses and agencies via the OAIC enquiries line.

Under the Privacy Act a person can make a complaint to the office about the handling of their personal information by Australian, ACT and Norfolk Island government agencies and private sector organisations covered by the Privacy Act. In some circumstances, the office may also initiate an OMI.

The office has the power to conduct privacy audits of Australian and ACT Government agencies, as well as some other organisations in certain circumstances.

The Privacy Advisory Committee (PAC) provides strategic advice on privacy, from a broad range of perspectives, to the Australian Information Commissioner. PAC was established under section 82 of the Privacy Act. All members except the Commissioner are appointed by Her Excellency the Governor-General. PAC consists of no more than six members and is convened by the Australian Information Commissioner.

== Information policy ==
The Information Commissioner reports to the Attorney-General on matters relating to Australian Government information management policy and practice, including FOI and privacy.

The Information Commissioner is assisted in this regard by an Information Advisory Committee (IAC), comprising senior officers from key agencies and people from outside government who have suitable qualifications or experience.

The office has released a set of Principles on open public sector information and an accompanying report. The principles are based on the premise that public sector information is to be managed for public purposes as a national resource.

The office encourages agencies to embed the principles in their internal policies and procedures on information management. The intention is that by doing so they will help build a culture of proactive information disclosure and community engagement.

== See also ==
- Privacy Act 1988
- Freedom of Information Act 1982
- Australian Human Rights Commission
