= Scullard v Knowles & Southern Regional Council for Education & Training =

Scullard v Knowles Education Council
- Court: Employment Appeal Tribunal
- Decided: 29 February 1996
- Citation: [1996] IRLR 344

Keywords
- Equal pay

Scullard v Knowles & Southern Regional Council for Education & Training [1996] IRLR 344 is a UK labour law case, concerning equal pay.

== Facts ==
Ms Scullard was a manager at a training unit of a charity. It had several units across the country. She wanted to compare herself to someone also employed by a Regional Advisory Council. Such Councils were funded by the Department for Employment, but were independent from the Secretary of State for Employment. The employer argued she could not compare men who worked in other units.

== Judgment ==
Mummery J, as President of the EAT held that ‘associated employer’ under s 1(6) had no application because the different units were not limited companies within s 1(6). Instead, one had to rely on the wider provision of art 157, which has direct effect and ‘is not confined to employment in undertakings which have a particular legal form such as a limited company’

== See also ==
- UK employment equality law
- Defrenne v Sabena (No 2) [1976] ECR 455 (C-43/75) ECJ held that TFEU art 157 required equal pay ‘for equal work which is carried out in the same establishment or service whether private or public’. But this was later reduced.
- Macarthys Ltd v Smith (No 2) [1981] QB 180, successful comparison with someone who preceded the claimant in employment
- Diocese of Hallam Trustees v Connaughton [1996] ICR 860 (EAT), successful comparison with someone who succeeded the claimant in employment
- South Ayrshire Council v Morton [2002] ICR 956, Court of Session held it was permissible for a teacher in one local authority to compare herself with a teacher in another
- Lawrence v Regent Office Care Ltd [2002] IRLR 822, [2002] ECR I-07325, (2002) C-320/00, a single source is held to be implicitly necessary to correct pay discrimination
