= Criticism of Tesco =

Criticism has been directed at Tesco from various groups, including national organisations, trade bodies, individuals, consumer groups and watchdogs, particularly since the early 2000s.

== Criticism of Tesco and related litigation ==
As with any large corporation, the Tesco supermarket chain is involved in litigation, usually from claims of personal injury from customers, claims of unfair dismissal from staff, and other commercial matters. Two notable cases were Ward v Tesco Stores Ltd, which set a precedent in so-called 'trip and slip' injury claims against retailers, and Tesco Supermarkets Ltd v Nattrass, which reached the House of Lords and became a leading case regarding the corporate liability of businesses for failures of their store managers (in a case of misleading advertising). Criticism of Tesco includes disapproval of the effects supermarket chains can have on farmers, suppliers and smaller competitors; along with claims of generally poor labour relations with its staff concerning sick leave regulations. Accusations concerning using cheap and/or child labour in Bangladesh amongst other places, have also arisen since the millennium.

== Cases in the UK ==
=== Corporate policy ===
==== The UK's Competition Commission monopoly inquiry ====
In 2006, the Office of Fair Trading (OFT) referred the UK grocery market to the Competition Commission for a new inquiry. In January 2007, the Competition Commission, published its initial findings into the UK grocery market. It said that they were "concerned with whether Tesco or any other supermarket can get into such a strong position, either nationally or locally, that no other retailer can compete effectively". It, however, found no actual basis for accusations that Tesco could use its land bank to control nearly half of national grocery retailing, and that suppliers' profits were being squeezed by the supermarket.

Tesco's 2004 Adminstore acquisition led to local and UK-wide protests. Tesco's other store openings and expansions are sometimes contested by campaign groups. When a company controls more than 25% of a business sector in the UK, it is usually blocked from buying other companies in that sector (but not from increasing its market share through organic growth). The Office of Fair Trading currently treats supermarkets and convenience stores as two distinct sectors—although this definition has been challenged by smaller retailers, including the Association of Convenience Stores.

==== Planning infringements and corporate "land bank" conspiracy theory ====
In February 2006, a group of UK MPs produced a report highlighting the near monopoly powers of the big four supermarkets. One problem discussed by the group was that of building without appropriate planning permission. The discussion stemmed from the company's building of a store in Stockport that was 20% larger than the company actually had permission to build. In September 2006, subsequent (retrospective) planning permission was requested by Tesco but refused.

Tesco Stores Ltd v Secretary of State for the Environment [1995] 1 W.L.R. 759; [1995] 2 All E.R. 636, deals with the Town and Country Planning Act 1990, where Tesco wanted to build a superstore outside Oxford.

Criticism of Tesco includes allegations of stifling competition due to its undeveloped "land bank", pugilistically aggressive new store development without real consideration of the wishes, needs and consequences to local communities, using cheap and/or child labour, opposition to its move into the convenience sector and breaching planning laws.

In April 2011, longstanding opposition to a Tesco Express store in Cheltenham Road, Stokes Croft, Bristol, evolved into a violent clash between opponents and police. The recently opened storefront was heavily damaged and the police reported the seizure of petrol bombs. Opponents such as No Tesco in Stokes Croft, have suggested that the store would damage small shops and harm the character of the area.

==== Pricing and advertising ====
The group has been criticised for its tactics, including allegedly misleading consumers with "phoney" price cuts. For example, advertising huge savings, when in fact they are only lowering the price of less popular items and raising the price of more popular goods or misleading customers into believing that a sale price was a genuine reduction, and not the most common price.

==== Trading relations with suppliers ====
Tesco is also censured by those who think that it infringes upon the interests of farmers and smaller suppliers. The company responds by claiming that it follows industry-best practice and sources locally where it can to meet customer demand. In March 2005, the Office of Fair Trading published an audit of the workings of its code of practice on relationships between supermarkets and their suppliers. It reported that no official complaints had been received against Tesco or any of the other major supermarkets, but the supermarkets' critics, including Friends of the Earth, contested that suppliers were prevented from complaining by fear of losing business, and called for more rigorous supervision of the supermarkets. A further report by the Office of Fair Trading in August 2005 concluded that the aims of the Code of Practice were being met.

In September 2006, Tesco came to an agreement with Tyrrells Crisps to stop selling grey market supplies. Tyrrells was founded by potato farmer Will Chase after big supermarkets' purchasing-power almost put his farm out of business. He started Tyrrells to gain greater margin by selling directly, and only sold through delicatessens and Waitrose supermarket. After Tesco bought supplies from the grey market, Chase sought legal advice but Tesco backed down.

Tesco has been subject to several claims of apparently out-of-date food being 'back-labelled' to appear still to be within date, and poor café hygiene

Tesco denied squeezing its suppliers in December 2013 after retail analyst Cantor Fitzgerald accused Tesco of practices that risked breaching the Groceries Supply Code of Practice and criticised its trading relationships. Similar accusations were also made in April 2005 despite its record £2,000,000,000 profit.

==== Labour relations ====
American union leaders, representing employees of Tesco's Fresh & Easy brand, have complained that a "stark contrast" exists between the way the supermarket chain treats their British workers and staff at their US business. The two countries have differing legal regimes for labor unions.

The UK trade union Usdaw relies upon a "partnership" model with large employers such as with Tesco, where there exists "privileged access" to the management of both organisations. This arrangement coupled with its actions has been met with criticism, such as where the union seemingly presents itself as being concerned more with maintaining its positive, comfortable position and easy membership supply than that of fair representation of its members, earning the union the pejorative backronym of Useless Seven Days A Week amongst workers and trade unionists.

=== Financial affairs ===
==== Taxation laws ====
In 2008 Tesco sued The Guardian for libel and malicious falsehood over the newspaper's claims that Tesco has developed a complex taxation structure involving offshore bank accounts in the tax haven of the Cayman Islands. The case was ultimately settled, with The Guardian issuing an apology.

==== SFO investigation into relations with the auditor PwC ====
In 2014, the Serious Fraud Office and the Financial Reporting Council investigated Tesco's auditing and accounting practices, citing suspicions of accounting irregularities. Tesco said it was "co-operating fully" with the SFO, who took matter out of the hands of the Financial Conduct Authority, the City's business regulator. Tesco suspended eight executives during the investigation, including the UK corporate boss Chris Bush, and withheld payments worth £2,000,000 to its former chief executive Philip Clarke and chief financial officer Laurie McIlwee. Tesco's auditor PwC declined to comment. The investigation concluded that profits were overstated by more than £250m over the course of several years.

=== Service levels ===
Tesco has been criticised for charging higher prices for the same products at its Express stores.

Tesco has been accused of excessive profiteering during the 2021–present United Kingdom cost-of-living crisis.

==== Clubcard ====
Tesco has been criticised for selling customers' preferences and spending habits.

Tesco has been criticised for changing access to all its special offers to Clubcard customers only.

In April 2023, the High Court ruled that Tesco was taking unfair advantage of competitor Lidl's discounter reputation with its Clubcard Prices logo design. In March 2024, Tesco lost an appeal it had infringed Lidl's trademark with its Clubcard Prices logo.

In February 2024, Tesco agreed to include unit pricing for its Clubcard offers following criticism it was misleading customers. Which? had reported Tesco to the Competition and Markets Authority about the issue the previous year.

=== Product quality issues ===
==== February 2013 horse meat scandal ====
In 2013, DNA tests revealed that horse meat was present in some meat products sold in Findus and ABP Food Group ready meals.

On 7 February 2013, it was revealed by the Food Standards Agency that the Findus beef lasagne range in the UK, France and Sweden and the shepherd's pie and moussaka ranges in France contained horse meat without proper declaration or official scrutiny. The contamination may have gone on since summer 2012 according to a leaked document. Ready packed meal firm Findus, Compass Group was the world's biggest catering firm at the time, and Whitbread, which was Britain's biggest hotel group, were indicted for illegally selling concealed horse meat in food products.

As a result, Tesco's market capitalization dropped €360 million on Wednesday 16 January 2013.

Tesco, the Co-operative Group and Aldi also decided to cancel contracts with ABP Food Group because of the adulteration.

In a public letter later that day, 11 firms, including Tesco and Asda, said they shared shoppers' "anger and outrage". Whitbread vowed to remedy the unacceptable situation on 26 February. The Food Standards Agency's (FSA) chief executive, Catherine Brown also said "it is unlikely we will ever know" how many unwittingly ate horse meat.

==== Food hygiene allegations ====
On 22 May 2007, the BBC's Whistleblower programme showed undercover footage detailing breaches of food hygiene rules in a branch of Tesco. The Whistleblower reporter applied for a job following a tip-off from a former employee. Breaches included the sale of products after their sell-by date; allegations that the company illegally and sold 'back-labelled' products after their use by date; falsification of temperature records; and the sale of partially cooked mince mixed with uncooked mince.

In addition to this the Food Safety Authority of Ireland, has on a number of occasions ordered the recall of Tesco branded products, including a case of glass contamination. Environmental Health Officers served a closure order on Tesco's store in Prussia Street, Dublin, the day after they inspected it, for a number of breaches of Food Hygiene Regulations.

In 2007, branches of Tesco and Sainsbury's were subject to claims of apparently out-of-date food being 'back-labelled' to appear still to be within date.

=== Alleged health and safety issues ===
==== Secret sale of Brian Fords discount stores ====
In June 2008, it was revealed that Tesco had bought independent supermarket Brian Fords discount stores (with one store in Barnstaple, Devon, UK) five years previously, without notifying the public. Tesco submitted planning applications for a new supermarket early in 2008 under Brian Fords' name. The plans included a Brian Fords sign and North Devon Council were said to be unaware of the Tesco takeover. It was later revealed that a separate property company, Wixley Properties Ltd (which had zero employees and zero turnover) had actually bought the supermarket. Tesco said they were in control of Wixley Properties Ltd.

==== Fake farms ====
In March 2016, Tesco came under fire for branding products with fictional farms names. Later in the year the National Farmers Union lodged a complaint with Trading Standards over the matter.

=== Xenophobia ===
==== Romanians ====
On 21 November 2020, a member of the Romanian diaspora in the United Kingdom pointed out that in one of Tesco's stores in London, there was a warning for shoplifters written in the Romanian language that said "notice for store thieves, you will be legally prosecuted if caught stealing". The Romanian women posted this on Facebook and called it "blatantly racist and xenophobic". She requested the removal of the poster, a petition that was joined by the Romanian Ministry of Foreign Affairs (MAE), which expressed its "surprise and disagreement against the strongly discriminating message". The news went viral and were later published in Romanian media. According to the Office for National Statistics, the Romanians in the United Kingdom then formed a community of about 427,000, making them the fourth largest foreign group in the country at the time.

=== Other ===
In June 2022, Tesco's adverts for one of its plant-based food ranges was banned for being misleading about their environmental benefit.

In March 2024, Tesco faced significant criticism for delaying a promised pay rise, which left many employees earning less than the minimum wage for nearly a month. This delay allowed Tesco to save over £17 million.

In 2024, Tesco was accused of using its wholesale subsidiary Booker Group to force the closure of local businesses and shops through undercutting their prices in Tesco stores, while providing higher prices in their wholesale arm. Additionally, it has been accused of intentionally stopping deliveries of certain essential products to independent stores, in some cases reducing item selection by up to 30%.

== Overseas ==
=== Ireland ===
Tesco Ireland is the largest food retailer in Ireland, with over 13,500 employees. As of 2004 Tesco Ireland has been criticised for apparently high prices in its Irish stores. This may be because comparisons are with the British Tesco stores rather than other Irish retailers – and thus like goods are not being compared with like. However, there have been general criticisms of the similar pricing between Irish supermarkets, and economic reports noting the high prices in Ireland generally. Research concluded that only a five per cent difference in the cost of goods between North and South was justifiable. The findings highlighted retailers' larger margins in the South vis-a-vis their operations in the North, and the Minister for Enterprise, Trade and Employment queried why the price differential in many identical goods was substantially in excess of 5%.

Tesco in Ireland was convicted of failing to properly display prices by the National Consumer Agency in July 2008.

A report by independent retailers group RGDATA contained allegations that Tesco overcharged customers. The report shows that customers in six Tesco stores were overcharged by an average of 3% on some items.

In 2009, the Advertising Standards Authority determined Tesco's advertising was misleading. It claimed consumers could “save over 40%" but collectively the savings on the products advertised was less than 40%.

In 2006, Tesco apologised for selling copies of the antisemitic forgery The Protocols of the Elders of Zion. Sheikh Dr Shaheed Satardien, head of the Muslim Council of Ireland, described the sales as "polluting the minds of impressionable young Islamic people with hate and anger towards the Jewish community." Tesco also sold the material in the UK.

=== Bangladesh ===
In Autumn 2006, a Channel 4 News investigation found child labour in four Bangladesh garment factories supplying Tesco. War on Want published a report alleging that wages were as low as £0.05 (US$0.07) per hour for 80+ hour working weeks. Tesco stated "All suppliers to Tesco must demonstrate that they meet our ethical standards on worker welfare, which are closely monitored. Our suppliers comply with local labour laws, and workers at all Bangladeshi suppliers to Tesco are paid above the national minimum wage." Campaigners argued the minimum wage in Bangladesh is too low, and that monitoring systems used by clothing retailers, such as Tesco, are ineffective.

=== China ===
In September 2011, Greenpeace reported supermarkets in China, including Tesco, were selling vegetables that contained illegal pesticides or others at levels exceeding safe limits. Of 16 fruit and vegetable samples obtained from Tesco stores in Beijing and Guangzhou, 11 did not comply with regulations and one contained residues of methamidophos and monocrotophos, both of which had been prohibited since 2007.

In December 2019, the BBC alleged Tesco's supply chain in China included forced prison labour.

=== Hungary ===
In 2010, two KDFSZ trade union officials that had persuaded a fellow employee and his family to report a serious accident were dismissed by Tesco Hungary. Tesco claimed the officials had been "unethical and dishonest", and that they had "violated good faith and respectability". The Democratic Confederation of Free Trade Unions alleged Tesco breached Hungary's Labour Code requirements to consult with their trade union prior to the dismissals.

=== Thailand ===
In 2008, Thailand's Tesco Lotus associate sought penalties of two years in prison and a £16.4m libel damages from, writer and former legislator, Jit Siratranont after he argued it was expanding aggressively at the expense of small, local retailers. Authors including Joanne Harris, Marina Lewycka and Deborah Moggach urged Tesco to "impress your critics with the force of argument, not the threat of imprisonment". The criminal defamation and civil libel cases were dismissed by the Thai courts. Tesco Lotus brought similar actions against two other critics. It dropped one and settled the other in return for an apology.

== See also ==
- Tesco Town
