= Tesco Supermarkets Ltd. v Nattrass =

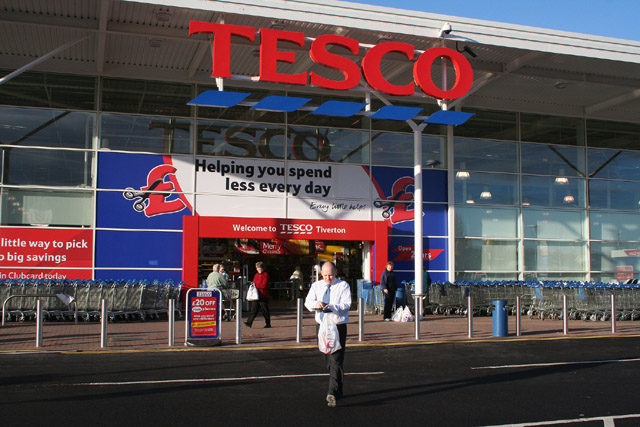
- Court: House of Lords
- Full case name: Tesco Supermarkets Limited v. Nattrass
- Citations: [1971] UKHL 1, [1972] AC 153

Court membership
- Judges sitting: Lord Reid, Lord Morris of Borth-y-Gest, Viscount Dilhorne, Lord Pearson, Lord Diplock

Keywords
- Corporate liability

Tesco Supermarkets Ltd. v Nattrass [1971] UKHL 1 is a leading decision of the House of Lords on the "directing mind" theory of corporate liability.

This is a leading case on the Trade Descriptions Act 1968 section 24(1), where Tesco relied upon the defence of the "act or omission of another person" i.e. their store manager, to show that they had taken all reasonable precautions and exercised all due diligence.

== Facts ==
Tesco was offering a discount on washing powder which was advertised on posters displayed in stores. Once they ran out of the lower priced product the stores began to replace it with the regularly priced stock. The manager failed to take the signs down and a customer was charged at the higher price. Tesco was charged under the Trade Descriptions Act 1968 for falsely advertising the price of washing powder. In its defence, Tesco argued that the company had taken all reasonable precautions and exercised all due diligence, and that the conduct of the manager could not attach liability to the corporation.

== Judgment ==
The House of Lords heard the case on appeal from the Divisional Court, and accepted the defence and found that the manager was not a part of the "directing mind" of the corporation and therefore his conduct was not attributable to the corporation. The corporation had done all it could to enforce the rules regarding advertising.

Lord Reid held that, in order for liability to attach to the actions of a person, it must be the case that "The person who acts is not speaking or acting for the company. He is acting as the company and his mind which directs his acts is the mind of the company. If it is a guilty mind then that guilt is the guilt of the company."

In the House of Lords, Tesco was successful with their defence showing that:

- a store manager was classed as 'another person', and
- a system of delegating responsibility to that person was performance of due diligence, not avoidance of it.

The store manager was not the directing mind and will of the company - the company had done all it could to avoid committing an offence and the offence was the fault of another person (an employee). The company was acquitted.

== See also ==
- Ward v. Tesco Stores Ltd.
- Criticism of Tesco
