= British Coal Corp v Smith =

British Coal Corporation v Smith
- Court: House of Lords
- Citation: [1996] IRLR 404

Keywords
- Equal pay

British Coal Corporation v Smith [1996] IRLR 404 is a UK labour law case, concerning equal pay.

== Facts ==
Three collective agreements covered canteen, clerical and surface mineworkers who were British Coal employees. All, however, had pay and conditions set through a centralised industry level agreement. The mineworkers got production extra bonuses, varying locally. The female canteen and clerical workers claimed they were being unequally paid. They did not get a coal bonus, but got everything else.

The Tribunal held that the bonuses were ‘locally varied fulfilment of the same universally accepted central terms’.

== Judgment ==
=== Court of Appeal ===
Balcombe LJ [1994] ICR 810 overturned this, arguing under the Equal Pay Act 1970 section 1(6) that conditions needed to be the same if one chose a comparator at a different establishment - and not broadly or essentially similar terms.

=== House of Lords ===
Lord Slynn restored the tribunal, saying, ‘the terms and conditions do not have to be identical’, just ‘substantially comparable’. Otherwise it would be ‘far too restrictive’.

The purpose of requiring common terms and conditions was to avoid it being said simply ‘a gardener does work of equal value to mine and my comparator at another establishment is a gardener’. It was necessary for the applicant to go further and show that gardeners at other establishments and at her establishment were or would be employed on broadly similar terms. It was necessary, but it was also sufficient.

== See also ==
- UK employment equality law
- Defrenne v Sabena (No 2) [1976] ECR 455 (C-43/75) ECJ held that TFEU art 157 required equal pay ‘for equal work which is carried out in the same establishment or service whether private or public’. But this was later reduced.
- Macarthys Ltd v Smith (No 2) [1981] QB 180, successful comparison with someone who preceded the claimant in employment
- Diocese of Hallam Trustees v Connaughton [1996] ICR 860 (EAT), successful comparison with someone who succeeded the claimant in employment
- South Ayrshire Council v Morton [2002] ICR 956, Court of Session held it was permissible for a teacher in one local authority to compare herself with a teacher in another
- Lawrence v Regent Office Care Ltd [2002] IRLR 822, [2002] ECR I-07325, (2002) C-320/00, a single source is held to be implicitly necessary to correct pay discrimination
