= Clay Cross (Quarry Services) Ltd v Fletcher =

UK labour law case

- Court: Court of Appeal
- Citation: [1978] 1 WLR 1429, [1978] IRLR 361

Keywords
- Discrimination

Clay Cross (Quarry Services) Ltd v Fletcher [1978] 1 WLR 1429 is a UK labour law case concerning sex discrimination, unequal pay, and the limits of justifications for it. It would now fall under the Equality Act 2010 sections 64 to 80.

== Facts ==
In Fletcher v. Clay Cross Limited [1978], the plaintiff Mrs Fletcher brought a claim of pay discrimination against her employer under the Equal Pay Act of 1970.

Mrs Fletcher was paid £35 per week, working alongside two other sales clerks. A colleague left and was replaced by Mr Tunnicliffe, aged 24. He was the only suitable candidate and was paid £43 per week, which matched his previous salary. The employer increased wages by £6 a week for all of them, but the disparity remained.

An expert said that clerks’ wages should be set at £43.46, but Mr Tunnicliffe’s wage still remained higher, at £49. Mrs Fletcher spent a while training him, and then when the Equal Pay Act 1970 came into force in 1975, she complained.

Tribunal held that Ms Fletcher did have an equal pay claim. The Employment Appeal Tribunal reversed this, holding that the man’s previous salary was a genuine material factor. Mrs Fletcher successfully appealed.

== Judgment ==
The Court of Appeal held that in determining whether there was a "material difference" justifying the disparity in wages, the tribunal should only consider intrinsic factors or the "personal equation of the woman as compared to that of the man", such as the "length of service, skill, qualifications and productivity". Lord Denning MR held that extrinsic factors such as the "circumstances under which they came to be employed" such as the employer's claim that they could not hire anyone else and was forced to pay what was asked, were irrelevant.

Lawton LJ and Browne LJ concurred.

== See also ==
- UK labour law
- UK employment equality law
- Macarthys Ltd v Smith in which the court referred the matter to the ECJ; and decided then similarly.
