= R v Bailey =

- Court: Court of Appeal (Criminal Division)
- Full case name: Regina v John Graham Bailey
- Decided: 11 March 1983
- Citation: [1983] EWCA Crim 2; 1 WLR 760; 2 All ER 503; 77 Cr App R 76
- Cases cited: R. v. Quick (1973) 57 Cr. App. R. 722; DPP v. Majewski (1976) 62 Cr. App. E. 262; Lipman (1969) 55 Cr. App. R. 600
- Legislation cited: Offences Against the Person Act 1861

Case history
- Prior actions: R v Bailey, Crown Court at Bolton, 14 October 1982 (unreported)
- Subsequent action: None

Court membership
- Judges sitting: Griffiths, LJ, Peter Pain, J, and Stuart-Smith, J.

Keywords
- wounding, automatism, intent, diabetes, self-induced automatism or aggression

R v Bailey is a 1983 decision of the Court of Appeal of England and Wales considering criminal responsibility as to non-insane automatism. The broad questions addressed were whether a hampered state of mind, which the accused may have a legal and moral duty to lessen or avoid, gave him a legal excuse for his actions; and whether as to any incapacity there was strong countering evidence (evidence of a largely sound mind at the time) on the facts involved. The court ruled that the jury had been misdirected as to the effect of a defendant's mental state on his criminal liability. However, Bailey's defence had not been supported by sufficient evidence to support an acquittal and his appeal was dismissed.

== Facts ==
Bailey was a diabetic and required regular doses of insulin. Following a domestic break-up, he went to discuss matters with his former cohabitee's new boyfriend. After a while Bailey claimed to be unwell and asked for some sugar and water. Minutes later, while the boyfriend was looking for Bailey's lost glove, Bailey hit him over the head with an iron bar, causing a head wound requiring stitches. He was charged with wounding the boyfriend with intent to cause grievous bodily harm contrary to section 18 of the Offences against the Person Act 1861.

== Trial ==
Bailey claimed at his trial that he had no memory of the attack and had been acting in a state of automatism caused by hypoglycaemia as he had not eaten since his last insulin dose. His general practitioner gave evidence that this might cause aggressive behaviour and loss of memory but was unlikely to have caused the sudden loss of awareness claimed by the defendant. The prosecution's case was that although theoretically possible, this was not what had happened. They argued that Bailey had armed himself with the iron bar and gone to the boyfriend's house with the intention of harming him. Evidence was given that shortly after the attack he had been interviewed by the police and seemed to behave quite normally.

Defence counsel submitted that Bailey had neither the specific intent to cause grievous bodily harm for the purpose of Section 18 nor the general intent for an alternative verdict of unlawful wounding; however, the Recorder followed the decision in R v Quick and directed the jury that self-induced incapacity did not provide a defence, on the basis that Bailey was aware of his condition and could have taken steps to avoid its effects simply by taking food after his insulin dose. He was convicted and appealed.

== Appeal ==
The Court of Appeal reviewed R v Quick, which had dealt with an allegation of assault occasioning actual bodily harm not requiring proof of specific intent. That decision suggested that even if the hypoglycaemia was induced by some action or inaction by the accused, his defence will not necessarily fail. However, the judge in Bailey's trial had not directed the jury to consider that situation. The court also pointed out that self-induced incapacity, as in Bailey's case, may be evidence of recklessness sufficient to attach guilt for crimes of basic intent.

In relation to the section 18 offence, which did require proof of specific intent, it was pointed out that DPP v Majewski had made it clear that a specific intent may be negatived even if the incapacity of mind is self-induced by voluntary taking of drugs or alcohol. In the present case, the jury had been misdirected on that point.

On either argument, the defendant would have been entitled to an acquittal; however, the court considered it doubtful whether Bailey had laid sufficient basis for his defence to be considered by the jury at all. If so, the jury would have been entitled to reject it. On the facts of the case, particularly Bailey's setting out armed with an iron bar, his apparent normality shortly after the incident, and the doctor's evidence as to the unlikelihood of such an episode of automatism in the circumstances, the court considered that there had been no miscarriage of justice. Bailey's appeal was dismissed.

== Commentary ==
The decision was cast the next year in the same court (in R v Hardie) as

[the defence]
(a) ... was clearly available to the offence embodying specific intent and
(b) because although self-induced by the omission to take food it was also available to negative the other offence which was of basic intent only.

This analysis is also accepted in legal textbooks, for example

The defence ... may not be available if the automatism was caused by the accused's own fault. Where someone loses control of their actions through drinking too much, or taking illegal drugs, the defence is unavailable, for obvious reasons of policy. Where the accused brings about the automatism in some other way, the availability of the defence will depend on whether they knew there was a risk of getting into such a state.

== See also ==
- Harris, Phil (2006). An Introduction to Law. Cambridge, England: Cambridge University Press. p. 309. ISBN 0-521-69796-4.
- Smith, John Cyril; Brian Hogan (2002). Criminal Law. London, England: Sweet & Maxwell. ISBN 0-406-94801-1.
- R v Quick and Anor [1973] EWCA Crim 1
- DPP v Majewski [1976] UKHL 2
