= Equal Pay Act 1970 =

Act of the Parliament of the United Kingdom

Equal Pay Act 1970 (Note: Section 11(1).)
- Act of Parliament
- Parliament of the United Kingdom
- Long title: An Act to prevent discrimination, as regards terms and conditions of employment, between men and women.
- Citation: 1970 c. 41
- Introduced by: Barbara Castle, Secretary of State for Employment and Productivity
- Territorial extent: England and Wales; Scotland; (Note: Section 11(3).)

Dates
- Royal assent: 29 May 1970
- Commencement: 29 December 1975 (Note: Section 9(1).)
- Repealed: 1 October 2010
Other legislation
Amended by	Employment Protection (Consolidation) Act 1978; Armed Forces Act 1981; Wages Act 1986; Trade Union Reform and Employment Rights Act 1993
Repealed by	Equality Act 2010

Status: Repealed

Text of statute as originally enacted

Revised text of statute as amended

The Equal Pay Act 1970 (c. 41) was an act of the Parliament of the United Kingdom that prohibited any less favourable treatment between men and women in terms of pay and conditions of employment. The act was proposed by the then Labour government, and was based on the Equal Pay Act of 1963 of the United States. It has now been mostly superseded by part 5, chapter 3 of the Equality Act 2010.

== History ==
In the 1964 general election, the Labour Party's manifesto had proposed a charter of rights including 'the right to equal pay for equal work'. September 1965 saw the Trades Union Congress resolving 'its support for the principles of equality of treatment and opportunity for women workers in industry, and calls upon the General Council to request the government to implement the promise of 'the right to equal pay for equal work' as set out in the Labour Party election manifesto'. However, there was no immediate action by either government or unions.

Brian Harrison says polls in 1968–69 showed public opinion was moving strongly in favour of equal pay for equal work; nearly three-quarters of those polled favoured the principle. A trigger cause for the introduction of the legislation was the 1968 Ford sewing machinists strike, though the legislation also paved the way for the UK's entry to the European Community, helping to bring it towards conformity with Article 119 of the Treaty of Rome, which says that 'each Member State shall ensure that the principle of equal pay for male and female workers for equal work or work of equal value is applied.'. The Act came into force on 29 December 1975. The term pay is interpreted in a broad sense to include, on top of wages, things like holidays, pension rights, company perks and some kinds of bonuses. The legislation has been amended on a number of recent occasions to incorporate a simplified approach under European Union law that is common to all member states. The 1970 Act only dealt with equal pay for the same work but in 1975 the EU directive on Equal Pay was passed based on article 119.

In 1978, despite the passage of legislation to promote equal pay, women's relative position in the UK was still worse than in Italy, France, Germany, or the Benelux countries in 1972.

The Equal Pay Act was repealed but its substantive provisions were replicated in the Equality Act 2010.

== Elements of a claim ==
For an employee to claim under this Act they must prove one of the following:

- That the work done by the claimant is the same, or broadly the same, as the other employee.
- That the work done by the claimant is of equal value (in terms of effort, skill, decision and similar demands) to that of the other employee.
- That the work done by the claimant is rated (by a job evaluation study) the same as that of the other employee.

Once the employee has established that they are employed on 'equal work' with their comparator then they are entitled to 'equal pay' unless the employer proves that the difference in pay is genuinely due to a material factor which is not the difference in gender.

== Single Status ==
In 1999, trade unions negotiated Single Status job evaluation for local government, hoping that this would enforce the Equal Pay Act without needing to take numerous pay claims to industrial tribunal. Single Status was intended to establish whether jobs were of equal value, and bring in a pay model which would remove the need for equal pay claims. Jobs which had previously been classed as manual or administrative/clerical would be brought together under one pay scale and one set of terms and conditions.

The implementation of Single Status in local government led to many claims being brought by employees as they sought compensation for past pay disparity.

== Cases ==
- Allonby v Accrington and Rossendale College [2004] IRLR 224
- Barber v Guardian Royal Exchange Assurance Group (C-262/88) [1991] 1 QB 344, definition of pay including occupational pension schemes
- Hayward v Cammell Laird Shipbuilders Ltd (No 2) [1988] AC 894, equality clause implication under EqPA 1970 s 1
- Home Office v Bailey [2005] IRLR 757, presumption of discrimination with a pay disparity
- Strathclyde Regional Council v Wallace [1998] 1 WLR 259, purpose of legislation not fair wages
- Shield v E Coomes Holding Ltd [1978] 1 WLR 1408, claimant must prove they are in like work to an actual comparator
- Capper Pass Ltd v Lawton [1977] QB 852, work must be 'of the same or a broadly similar nature'
- Eaton Ltd v Nuttall [1977] 1 WLR 549, the work may be rated as equivalent under EqPA s 1(5) through a job evaluation scheme which is 'thorough in analysis and capable of impartial application'
- Pickstone v Freemans plc [1989] AC 66, a 'token man' defence does not defeat a claim
- Macarthys Ltd v Smith (No 2) [1981] QB 180, a predecessor is a valid comparator
- Diocese of Hallam Trustee v Connaughton [1996] ICR 860, a successor is a valid comparator
- Leverton v Clwyd County Council [1989] AC 706, 'common terms and conditions' can include those under collective agreements
- British Coal Corporation v Smith [1996] ICR 515, terms and conditions must be 'substantially comparable' not identical
- Lawrence v Regent Office Care Ltd [2002] IRLR 822, contracting out, an associated employer and a 'single source' test under art 141 TEC
- Ratcliffe v North Yorkshire County Council [1995] ICR 833, contracting out
- North Cumbria Acute Hospitals NHS Trust v Potter [2009] IRLR 176, 'single source' test
- Defrenne v Sabena [1976] ICR 547 (C-43/75), the 'same establishment or service' definition
- Clay Cross (Quarry Services) Ltd v Fletcher [1979] ICR 1, personal factors in the material difference defence
- Rainey v Greater Glasgow Health Board [1987] AC 224, labour scarcity or geographical factors in the defence
- Enderby v Frenchay Health Authority [1994] ICR 112 (C-127/92), defence through the 'state of the employment market' under the proportionality principle
- Glasgow County Council v Marshall [2000] ICR 196, under the Sex Discrimination Act 1975 if no evidence of discrimination is found, a pay disparity need not be justified
- Redcar and Cleveland Borough Council v Bainbridge and Surtees v Middlesbrough Borough Council [2008] EWCA Civ 885, [2008] IRLR 776
- GMB v Allen [2008] EWCA Civ 810, [2008] IRLR 690
- Birmingham City Council v Abdulla, in which the Supreme Court said that employees can claim equal pay up to six years after leaving their job. Leading legal experts have suggested that this could open the floodgates of litigation, with the public sector bearing the brunt of the impact.

== See also ==
- UK employment discrimination law
- Equal Pay Act of 1963, the United States legislation which influenced the Act
- Equal pay for women
- Equal Pay Campaign Committee UK (1941-1956)
- Gender pay gap
- See John Howard Locke (Department of Employment) for details on the drafting of the Bill/Act

== Bibliography ==
- Conley, Hazel. "Trade unions, equal pay and the law in the UK." Economic and Industrial Democracy 35.2 (2014): 309–323.
- Deakin, Simon, et al. "Are litigation and collective bargaining complements or substitutes for achieving gender equality? A study of the British Equal Pay Act." Cambridge Journal of Economics 39.2 (2015): 381–403. online
- Dickens L . "The road is long: thirty years of equality legislation in Britain," British Journal of Industrial Relations (2007) vol. 45, 463–94.
- Gilbert, Kay. "Promises and practices: job evaluation and equal pay forty years on!." Industrial Relations Journal 43.2 (2012): 137–151.
- E McGaughey, A Casebook on Labour Law (Hart 2019) ch 1, 35
- Zabalza A. and Z. Tzannatos. Women and Equal Pay: The Effects of Legislation on Female Employment and Wages in Britain (Cambridge University Press, 1985).
