= R (Factortame Ltd) v Secretary of State for Transport =

UK-Spanish legal case

R (Factortame Ltd) v Sec. of State for Transport
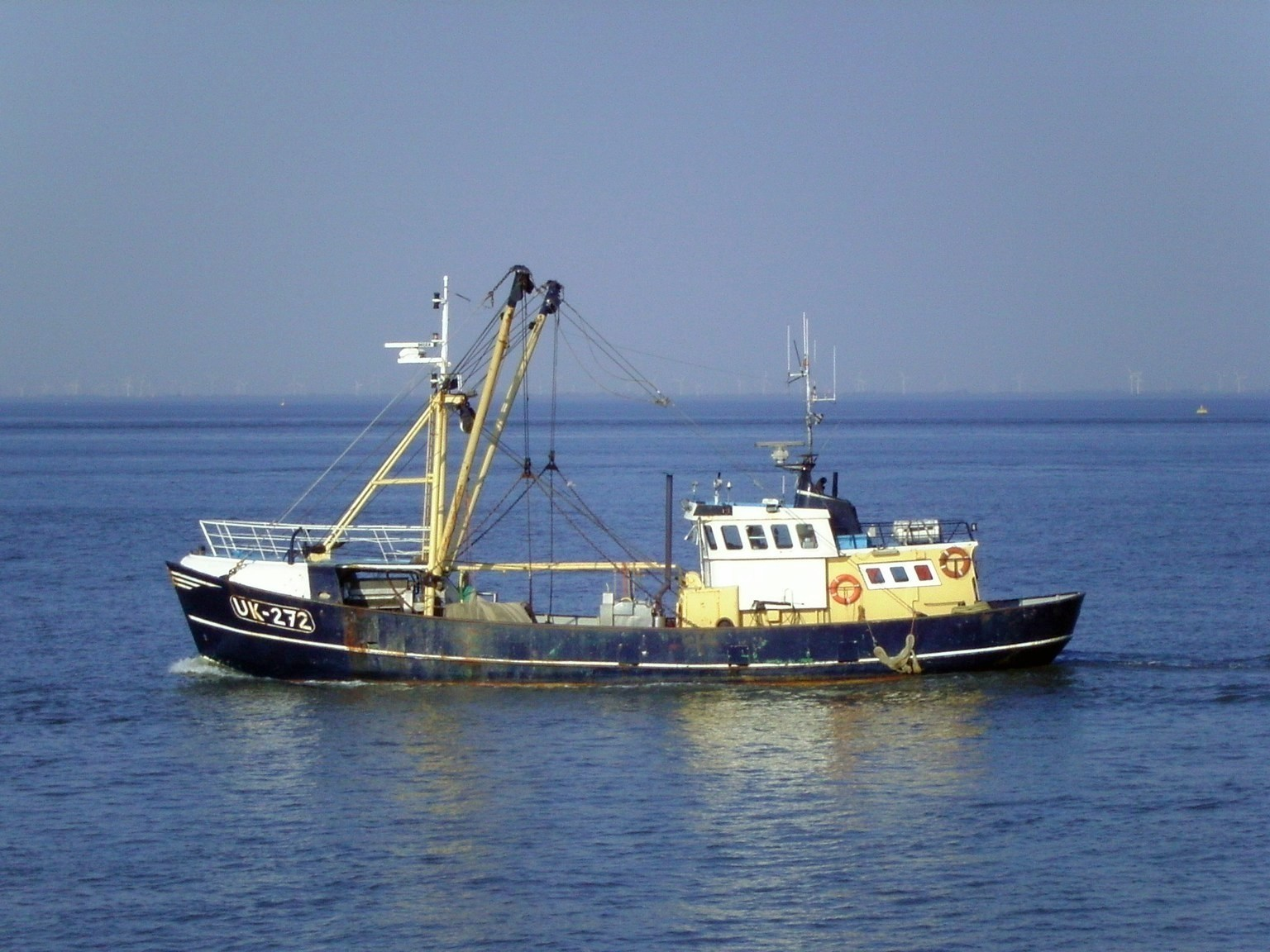
- Court: House of Lords, European Court of Justice
- Full case name: R (Factortame Ltd) v Secretary of State for Transport
- Decided: March 1989 to November 2000
- Citations: [1990] UKHL 7; [1990] C-213/89; (1991) C-221/89; (1996) C-46/93; [1999] UKHL 44; [2000] EWHC 179

Keywords
- Parliamentary sovereignty, direct effect, Common Fisheries Policy

R (Factortame Ltd) v Secretary of State for Transport was a judicial review case taken against the United Kingdom government by a company of Spanish fishermen who claimed that the United Kingdom had breached European Union law (then Community Law) by requiring ships to have a majority of British owners if they were to be registered in the UK. The case produced a number of significant judgements on British constitutional law, and was the first time that courts held that they had power to restrain the application of an Act of Parliament pending trial and ultimately to disapply that Act when it was found to be contrary to EU law.

The litigation was lengthy, and is typically divided into five main stages:

- Factortame I, where the High Court and then the House of Lords (which functioned as the final court of appeal prior to 2009) both made a reference to the European Court of Justice (ECJ) on the legality of the Merchant Shipping Act 1988's ("MSA") requirement for UK fishing vessels to be 75% UK owned. After the ECJ confirmed the incompatibility of the Act with EU law, Factortame saw the House of Lords confirm the primacy of EU law over national law in the areas where the EU has competence because of the UK acceding to the EU treaties.
- Factortame II, where the ECJ held that the provisions of the MSA were required to be disapplied by the UK courts if they contravened EU law.
- Factortame III, where the ECJ held that a member state could be liable for damages in an action by the European Commission for breach of EU law.
- Factortame IV, where the House of Lords ruled that damages could be awarded against a member state like the UK for losses suffered by private parties under the Francovich v Italy principle, that wrongs by violation of a public body generate a private law claim from anybody who has suffered a directly connected loss (also known as the doctrine of state liability).
- Factortame V, holding that claims after 1996 were statute-barred, since claims against a member state were like other claims in tort under the Limitation Act 1980.

== Facts ==
The EU's Common Fisheries Policy, which began in 1970, aimed at creating a common market for fisheries products by providing for free access to the waters of all member states and introducing structural funds to ensure modernisation of the sector. In 1976 it was agreed that, as from 1 January the following year, member states would extend their exclusive economic zone, which included the limit of their fishing zones, to a distance 200 nautical miles (370 km) from their coastlines. In 1980 the EU concluded a fisheries agreement with Spain, which did not become a member of the EU until 1985, which gave the latter (which had the largest fishing fleet in Europe) limited rights to fish in the waters of the member states. In 1983 concerns over the effect that equality of access might have on fishing stocks led to the introduction of certain controls, notably the concept of "total allowable catches" which set maximum quotas of fish which could be caught by each member state, and the British Fishing Boats Act 1983 (BFBA). In 1985, with Spanish accession, everything changed and the BFBA no longer applied to the Spanish fishermen.

From 1980, as seen earlier, Galician fishermen began to enter the UK fishing market by taking advantage of easy fishing vessel registration requirements contained in the Merchant Shipping Act 1894. (57 & 58 Vict. c. 60) Although the 1894 act prohibited ownership of vessels by non-UK nationals, UK-domiciled companies were allowed registration as the owners. Amongst the early beneficiaries of the 1894 act was Factortame Limited, a company whose directors were Joseph J L Couceiro, John A Couceiro and Ken L Couceiro, all British nationals with Spanish ancestry resident and domiciled in the United Kingdom. The company, together with 96 others whose directors and shareholders were mostly Spanish nationals, re-registered 53 vessels which had formerly flown the Spanish flag as British fishing vessels under the 1894 Act. They also acquired 42 existing British vessels with a view to using them in the fishing zone. Most of these vessels landed their catches in Spain, but as the fish were caught in UK waters, they counted against the UK fishing quota, a practice known as "quota hopping".

In order to put an end to this practice, the British Government enacted a series of measures which proved largely ineffective. In two cases the High Court of Justice of England and Wales asked preliminary questions to ECJ; based on which both cases were lost by HMG – see Agegate (C-3/87, ECLI:EU:C:1989:650) and Jaderow (C-216/87, ECLI:EU:C:1989:651). In 1988 the Merchant Shipping Act 1988 and the Merchant Shipping (Registration of Fishing Vessels) Regulations were introduced as a result, to replace the system of registration contained in the 1894 Act with a new system under which a vessel could only be registered if it had "a genuine and substantial connection" with the UK. For this to be the case, three conditions had to be fulfilled: (i) the vessel must be British-owned; (ii) the vessel had to be managed and its operations had to be directed and controlled from the UK; and (iii) any charterer, manager or operator had to be a qualified person or company. A "qualified person or company" was a person who was a British citizen resident and domiciled in the UK or a company which was incorporated in the UK and had its principal place of business there having at least 75% of its shares owned by, and at least 75% of its directors being, "qualified persons".

As from 31 March 1989, fishing vessel registrations under the 1894 Act would lapse and the owners would be required to re-register under the 1988 Act. None of Factortame's vessels could satisfy the new requirements and an action for judicial review was brought by its owners in a divisional court of the High Court in December 1988.

== Factortame I ==
Factortame Ltd sought, first, a preliminary injunction declaring that the offending part of the 1988 Act could not be applied to them on the grounds that such application would be contrary to directly effective rights under EU law, specifically the right not to be discriminated against on the grounds of nationality (article 7 of the Treaty of Rome), the right of individuals and companies to establish themselves in business anywhere in the EU (articles 43–48), and the right to participate in the capital of companies situated in another Member State (article 294). The claimants also demanded an order of prohibition preventing the Secretary of State from treating its registrations under the 1894 Act as having ceased.

HMG argued that the registration requirements were intended to ensure that fishing vessels flying the British flag had a genuine link with the UK. It maintained that international law entitled each State to determine the conditions under which a ship might fly its flag and that Community law had not removed that right. It was also contended that the 1988 Act was consistent with the Community policy on fisheries. In the event this assertion proved false.

=== High Court ===
On 10 March 1989 the divisional court (Neill LJ and Hodgson J) referred the matter to the European Court of Justice (ECJ) for a preliminary ruling under Article 234 of the Treaty of Rome (case C-221/89). It asked whether requirements as to nationality, domicile and control imposed by a Member State as conditions for the registration of fishing vessels were compatible with Community law (now: European Union law). At the same time, the Court granted an injunction against the application of the 1988 Act pending a ruling by the ECJ. Giving his judgment, Lord Justice Neill stated that although Community law is part of English law and prevails in the event of a conflict, it was open to argument whether a conflict existed in this case; a national court would have to take a decision which preserves the status quo ante. HMG disapproved and elevated the case to the Court of Appeal.

=== Court of Appeal ===
The Court of Appeal (Lord Donaldson MR, Bingham LJ and Mann LJ) reversed the divisional court's decision on 22 March 1989 on the basis that, although a national court was obliged to give effect to Community law, it was not obliged "to override national law in favour of what is no more than an alleged or putative Community right". Furthermore, it did not believe that the divisional court had "acknowledged the constitutional enormity, as the law stands, of requiring a Secretary of State to act contrary to the clearly expressed will of Parliament when the unlawfulness of that expression has yet to be established". The divisional court would not, according to the court, have jurisdiction to grant an injunction until Factortame had succeeded before the ECJ.

=== House of Lords ===
The case was brought on 18 May 1989 by Factortame before the House of Lords (Lord Bridge, Lord Brandon, Lord Oliver, Lord Goff and Lord Jauncey) who upheld the decision of the Court of Appeal on the grounds that English law did not contain any rule allowing a preliminary injunction against the application of an Act of Parliament. According to Lord Bridge, two obstacles stood in the way of the granting of the injunction. Firstly, the relief sought required the court to order positive action in the shape of the disapplication of the 1988 Act and the application of the 1894 Act; were Factortame not to succeed before the ECJ, the House of Lords would have "conferred upon them rights directly contrary to Parliament's sovereign will". Secondly, the court had no jurisdiction to grant an interim injunction against the Crown.

Nevertheless, Lord Bridge did accept that each of these obstacles was subject to any contrary Community law requirement. This required the House of Lords to determine whether, regardless of the position in national law, there existed an overriding principle of Community law imposing an obligation on a national court, faced with a seriously arguable claim to rights having direct effect under Community law, to grant interim relief. Lord Bridge concluded that as there was no clear authority on this question, a decision from the ECJ was necessary to enable the House of Lords to give judgment. The House was, in any event, obliged to request a preliminary ruling under Article 234 EC (now Article 267 TFEU post-Lisbon Treaty) which obliges courts "against whose decisions there is no judicial remedy under national law" to make a reference. This request for a preliminary ruling was in addition to that already made by the divisional court on the compatibility of the 1988 Act with Community law.

=== European Court of Justice ===
The action was lodged at the ECJ on 10 July 1989 (as Case C-213/89) by the House of Lords with the request that it deal with the matter quickly, which it indeed did, giving the case priority over others. The whole matter had up until then proceeded with great speed, taking only six months from its commencement before the divisional court to the House of Lords' judgment. The questions posed essentially asked whether, in the circumstances of the case, Community law overrode English law and either empowered or obliged UK courts to grant the injunction claimed by Factortame.

Advocate-General Tesauro argued his opinion on 17 May 1990 (ECLI:EU:C:1990:216). He first noted that the injunction sought by Factortame would in fact be available in all Member States except the UK and Denmark. He then proceeded to conclude that a national court must have the power to provisionally set aside a national law which conflicts with Community law, founding his argument on three bases. He recalled that it had been established in Simmenthal (case 106/77) that directly effective Community law provisions create legal rights which are enforceable by individuals from the date of their entry into force, regardless of any contrary national law. It also followed from the ECJ's case law that it was for the legal system of each Member State to designate the procedures intended to protect Community law rights, and that these procedures must not "be adapted so as it make it impossible in practice to exercise the rights which the national courts are required to protect" (case 61/79, Denkavit, ECLI:EU:C:1978:49). National courts must, in that respect, apply EC law through available national procedures or, failing that, of their own motion. Focusing on the House of Lords' argument that it could not temporarily suspend the application of a national law, the Advocate-General emphasised the importance of interim relief in every legal system, remarking that its purpose was to ensure that the time needed to establish a right would not deprive that right of any substance. Furthermore, he did not believe that national courts were entitled to give priority to national legislation merely because it had not yet been shown to be incompatible with Community law; if that were the case, rights conferred by national law would have greater protection than that offered to Community law rights.

On 19 June 1990 the ECJ court (as "full court" of 11 justices) en banc gave its ruling, rephrasing the question posed as "whether a national court which, in a case before it concerning Community law, considers that the sole obstacle which precludes it from granting interim relief is a rule of national law, must disapply that rule". Following the Advocate-General's opinion, the ECJ held that a national court, in fact, has a duty to grant interim relief to safeguard alleged Community rights of individuals until the decision of the ECJ on the interpretation of Community law is available, and where a rule of national law would deny such relief, to set aside that rule. The basis of such a duty lies in the nature and object of directly effective Community law rights which are intended to be fully effective throughout the EU, and where it is necessary to grant interim measures in order to safeguard such a right, a national court must do so. This is especially true where a national court is awaiting a clarification or interpretation of the right claimed by the ECJ.

=== Back to the House of Lords ===
On 11 October 1990 the House of Lords gave its judgment in the light of the ECJ's ruling and granted an injunction in favour of Factortame. Three principal issues emerged from their judgment, namely the availability of interim relief against the Crown, the basis on which such relief can be granted, and the impact of the ruling on parliamentary sovereignty. Lord Goff acknowledged that, as a matter of Community law, interim relief had to be available in principle against the Crown, and the basis for granting it lay in section 37 of the Supreme Court Act 1981 (now titled the Senior Courts Act 1981).

In deciding to grant relief to Factortame, two factors influenced the House of Lords. Firstly, the likelihood that Factortame would suffer hardship and loss, were relief not to be allowed. Secondly, the prospects of Factortame succeeding in a full trial of the case once the ECJ had given its ruling on the compatibility of the 1988 Act; in this regard, the House of Lords took into account indications from the ECJ's first ruling that Factortame's arguments had "considerable force". Lord Goff did, however, emphasise that the courts would not, in other cases, readily or easily grant an injunction against the Crown which effectively prevents the Crown from applying national law.

Addressing the public criticism expressed following the ECJ's decision and the alleged erosion of Parliamentary sovereignty, Lord Bridge remarked that such comments were "based on a misconception", and that under the European Communities Act 1972, the law regulating the UK's membership of the EU, it had "always been clear that it was the duty of a United Kingdom court when delivering final judgment, to override any rule of national law found to be in conflict with any directly enforceable rule of Community law". In the same way that Parliament had introduced legislation to remedy areas of UK law which did not meet the standards set by EU directives, the House of Lords was now accomplishing the same task in giving judgment for Factortame. There was nothing new, in this respect, in recognising the supremacy of EU law in the areas in which it applies.

These comments were perceived by Sir William Wade as "revolutionary", in that Lord Bridge suggests that Parliament has, in passing the European Communities Act 1972, managed to bind its successors from repealing the Act impliedly. It had previously been thought that no parliament could ever bind its successors in such a way. In a case where two statutes conflicted, the traditional approach would have been to apply the later statute on the basis that the inconsistent parts of the earlier statute had been repealed.

Such an interpretation of the case is supported by statements in Thoburn v Sunderland City Council and Hunt v Hackney Borough Council to the effect that there now exist two forms of Acts of Parliament: ordinary acts which can be repealed impliedly, and "statutory" or "constitutional" acts which can only be repealed expressly. (See in particular the judgment of Laws LJ in Thoburn.) Nevertheless, there is no restriction on the ability of Parliament to expressly repeal the European Communities Act 1972.

Furthermore, the case does not, on a strict reading, constitute a breach of parliamentary sovereignty. The Merchant Shipping Act 1988 was not a purposeful and direct conflict with EC law, but was instead an attempt to give effect to the fishing quotas required under EC law. Therefore, the courts were not striking down a domestic Act of Parliament, but were instead attempting to interpret legislation in a manner compatible with the Treaty obligations that arise under the European Communities Act 1972 (as proposed by Lord Diplock in the case of Garland v British Rail Engineering). It remains to be seen how the courts would respond to an Act of Parliament intentionally contradicting EC law. However, in the case of Macarthys v Smith, Lord Denning suggested that, should such an event occur, the courts would be obliged to obey the domestic law over the European.

== Factortame II compatibility ==
On 25 July 1991 the ECJ gave its ruling in case C-221/89 on the question referred by the High Court, namely whether the conditions for registration of fishing vessels under the 1988 Act were compatible with Community law. Agreeing with Advocate-General Mischo's opinion, the court (sitting as the full court of 11 justices) en banc held that "it is for the Member States to determine ... the conditions which must be fulfilled in order for a vessel to be registered in their registers and granted the right to fly their flag, but, in exercising that power, the Member States must comply with the rules of Community law". In particular, the conditions for registration should not constitute obstacles for nationals of one Member State to establish themselves in business in the territory of another Member State (the freedom of establishment), nor should they discriminate on the basis of nationality.

In the event, the ECJ found the nationality requirements in the Merchant Shipping Act 1988 discriminatory and contrary to Article 43 EC as a restriction on the freedom of establishment. It also violated articles 12 and 221 EC. The residence and domicile conditions also breached Article 43. In effect, by introducing a requirement based on an individual's residence and domicile, the Act operated an unfair distinction between UK nationals and those from other Member States as "the great majority of nationals of the [UK] are resident and domiciled in that State and therefore meet that requirement automatically, whereas nationals of other Member States would, in most cases, have to move their residence and domicile to [the UK] in order to comply with the requirements of [the 1988 Act]". In respect of the condition that the vessel should be managed and its operations directed from the UK, the ECJ found, however, that this requirement was compatible with Community law.

The UK government had argued that the conditions imposed by the 1988 Act were justified on the basis that the Common Fisheries Policy allowed for a system of national quotas and the 1988 Act ensured the effectiveness of that system. This was rejected by the ECJ which stated that fishing vessel registration criteria were permitted, but not where they violated Community law. It was, in that respect, open to the UK government to introduce conditions ensuring that a "real economic link" existed between the ship and the State of registration, but such a link had to "concern only the relations between the vessel's operations and the population dependent on fisheries and related industries". In other words, it would have been possible for the UK government to prescribe conditions which protected UK fishing communities from the effects of the opening up of national fishing waters to other Member States, but it could not do that through the imposition of explicit nationality and residence conditions.

== Factortame III state liability ==
Following the ECJ's second ruling, the case returned once more to the High Court which, on 18 November 1992, requested a third ruling from ECJ concerning the conditions under which a member state may incur liability for damage caused to individuals by breaches of Community law attributable to that state. At around the same time the German Federal Court had asked for a ruling on a similar question in the case of Brasserie du Pêcheur v Bundesrepublik Deutschland and so the two cases (C46/93 and C48/93) were joined.

At this time the ECJ had just delivered judgment in Francovich (ECLI:EU:C:1991:428), which established the principle that "a State must be liable for loss and damage caused to individuals as a result of breaches of Community law". The Factortame case provided the court for an opportunity to elaborate on the principles underlying the liability of member states. It was a case in which almost all member states intervened to deny, whether wholly or substantially, the right to claim damages; the UK accepted that there was, in principle, such a right. The EC Treaty does not deal expressly with the consequences of a breach of Community law by a member state, and so it was for the court to rule on the question having regard to "the fundamental principles of the Community legal system and, where necessary, general principles common to the legal systems of the Member States".

In its judgment delivered on 5 March 1996, the court of nine justices en banc reaffirmed the right of reparation, and stated that it existed irrespective of whether the provision of Community law in question has direct effect. Furthermore, the principle applies to any case where a member state breaches Community law, irrespective of which organ of the state was responsible for the breach. The ECJ rejected the contentions that the right to reparation required the introduction of legislation by the EU, and that the availability of damages should be decided, in each case, on the basis of the national law of the state in question.

The court proceeded to outline the conditions on which liability would be established. It underlined that such conditions could not, in the absence of a particular justification, differ from the conditions applicable to the liability of the Community in similar circumstances. Further, the right to reparation would depend on the nature of the breach of Community law in question and the extent of the discretion available to the State in question. The conditions are:

1. the rule of law infringed must be intended to confer rights on individuals;
2. the breach must be sufficiently serious;
3. there must be a direct causal link between the breach of the obligation and the damage sustained by the injured party.

In the case where a state had exercised broad discretion in passing legislation which breached Community law (as was the case in Factortame), for the breach to be "sufficiently serious" it must be "manifest" and "grave". National courts have jurisdiction to decide how to characterise the breach in question, taking into account the clarity and precision of the Community rule infringed, whether the damage was intentional or involuntary, whether any error of law was excusable, and whether a Community institution contributed towards the adoption or maintenance of contrary national measures or practices. These same conditions apply to state liability for damage caused by the decision of a judicial body adjudicating at last instance.

== Factortame IV right to damages ==
The matter came back to a divisional court (Hobhouse LJ, Collins J and Moses LJ) which ruled on 31 July 1997 that HMG had committed a sufficiently serious breach of Community law in passing the offending provisions of the Merchant Shipping Act 1988, and that that breach gave rise to damage for which Factortame should be compensated. The court rejected a claim by Factortame for exemplary damages. The decision was appealed by HMG to the Court of Appeal (Lord Woolf MR, Schiemann LJ and Walker LJ) which rejected the appeal on 8 April 1998. HMG appealed again to the House of Lords (Lord Slynn, Lord Nicholls, Lord Hoffmann, Lord Clyde and Lord Hope).

The House of Lords unanimously ruled in favour of Factortame on 28 October 1999. It rejected the argument that HMG's reliance on legal advice at the time of passing the 1988 Act did not deprive the breach of its grave and manifest character. The court did accept, however, that the government had acted in good faith in passing the Act. Nevertheless, the government had been aware of the risk it was running with such legislation and it had done everything possible to ensure that fishermen could not obtain interim relief against the Act's application. The case would now go back to a divisional court for the amount of damages to be determined.

In March 2000, Factortame and the other claimants (approximately 90 Anglo-Spanish fishing companies) accepted an offer of settlement from the Secretary of State. Under the terms of the settlement the claimants, who had originally claimed £285 million, received £55 million including interest of some £26 million.

== Factortame V limitation issues ==
On 27 November 2000, Judge Toulmin in the Technology and Construction Court (a division of the High Court) held, under the Limitation Act 1980, Factortame's claims against the UK government were "actions founded on tort", and that consequently a six-year limitation period applied. This meant that other claims against the Merchant Shipping Act 1988 would only be admissible if they had been lodged by 10 July 1996 (i.e. six years from the House of Lords' decision of 9 July 1990 granting Factortame interim relief), otherwise such claims were statute-barred. The judge therefore rejected claims by Factortame in respect of other fishing vessels which had been refused registration under the 1988 Act, but which had not formed part of the original claim lodged in 1988, nor had been claimed before July 1996.

The judge also rejected an attempt by Factortame to obtain damages for injury to feelings and aggravated damages caused by HMG's breach of Community law. Factortame had argued that claims for discrimination under European law were broadly comparable to claims for discrimination to individuals under the Race Relations Act 1976. This was not accepted by Judge Toulmin who emphasised that such damages were only awarded in cases where the breach in question had caused harm to the claimant's self-esteem.

== Significance ==
The Factortame case has produced large amounts of academic debate as to whether it can be reconciled with the idea of legislative supremacy as stated by Dicey. Sir William Wade argues that the Factortame judgment alters the Rule of Recognition.

The issue of whether the UK Parliament or the European Court of Justice had ultimate sovereignty over European Community laws which applied to the UK is still an area of intense legal debate and conflicting views. Prior to Brexit (31 January 2020), the UK recognised the primacy of the European Court of Justice for those areas of law in which the EU has competency. However, in Macarthys Ltd v Smith, Lord Denning MR said, "If the time should come when our Parliament deliberately passes an Act—with the intention of repudiating the Treaty or any provision in it—or intentionally of acting inconsistently with it—and says so in express terms—then ... it would be the duty of our courts to follow the statute of our Parliament."

This view of the UK's ultimate sovereignty was supported by Lord Justice Laws in the Thoburn v Sunderland City Council case, when he said that "there is nothing in the European Communities Act which allows the European Court, or any other institution of the EU, to touch or qualify the conditions of Parliament's legislative supremacy in the United Kingdom ... That being so, the legislative and judicial institutions of the EU cannot intrude upon those conditions."

That European law had primacy over UK law has been stated many times in European courts. In ECJ Case 6/64 Costa v ENEL (1964), the ECJ stated that "the Members States have limited their sovereign rights, albeit within limited fields". In Case 26/62 Van Gend en Loos v Nederlandse Administratie der Belastingen (1963) their ruling states that "the Community constitutes a new legal order of international law for the benefit of which the states have limited their sovereign rights".

The question of who has the ultimate kompetenz-kompetenz (i.e. the right to decide the limits of jurisdiction of the European Court of Justice) has now been settled.

== See also ==
- European Union law
- 1993 Cherbourg incident
- Supremacy (European Union law), and the Solange doctrine of German law
- Constitution of the United Kingdom
- History of the British constitution
- Pescanova
