= Asda Stores Ltd v Brierley =

United Kingdom labour law case

- Court: Supreme Court of the United Kingdom
- Citation: [2021] UKSC 10

Keywords
- Equal pay, comparators, establishment, common terms

Asda Stores Ltd v Brierley [2021] UKSC 10 is a UK labour law case, concerning equal pay and comparators.

== Facts ==
Women working at Asda supermarkets claimed equal pay to men in Asda's distribution depots. To claim unequal pay, the Equality Act 2010 requires a real-life comparator. Comparators who work at another establishment must have ‘common terms’ as defined in the Equality Act 2010 section 79(4)(c), and its predecessor, the Equal Pay Act 1970 section 1(6).

The Employment Tribunal, presided over by Ryan J, held that the claimants could compare themselves to the male distribution depot workers. The Employment Appeal Tribunal (EAT) and Court of Appeal subsequently dismissed Asda's appeal.

== Judgment ==
The Supreme Court dismissed Asda's appeal. Lady Arden gave the unanimous judgment.

7. This is clearly a very substantial case for Asda. At the time of the hearing before the employment tribunal in June 2016, Asda had around 630 retail stores and employed approximately 133,000 hourly-paid retail employees. At the date of the agreed statement of facts and issues prepared for this appeal, there were some 35,000 claimants. However, my conclusion, agreed by the other Justices hearing this appeal, does not mean that the claimants’ claims for equal pay succeed. At this stage all that has been determined is that they can use terms and conditions of employment enjoyed by the distribution employees as a valid comparison. The claimants must still show that they performed work of equal value. Asda will be able to rely on any defence open to it, including (if appropriate) the statutory defence that the difference in pay was due to a genuine material factor which was not itself discriminatory on the grounds of sex.

...

20. I will examine the principal cases, which are Leverton v Clwyd County Council [1989] AC 706; British Coal Corpn v Smith [1996] ICR 515 and Dumfries and Galloway Council v North [2013] ICR 993. They were all cases under the EPA 1970, and so they concerned events which took place before the EA 2010 came into effect.

...

25. In the North case, nursery nurses and learning assistants employed by the local authority on terms in one collective bargaining agreement claimed that other employees of the local authority, such as refuse collectors, refuse drivers and leisure pool attendants, employed under another collective bargaining agreement, were comparators. The two groups of employees worked at different establishments, so no persons within the comparator group were employed at the claimants’ establishment and so the words of Lord Slynn were engaged, namely that “like terms and conditions would apply if men were employed there in the particular jobs concerned” (see the preceding paragraph). The issue was how this was to be achieved. The EAT (Lady Smith) considered that in that situation the claimants had to show that the employment of the comparators at their establishment was a realistic possibility. In a later case, City of Edinburgh Council v Wilkinson [2010] IRLR 756, the EAT (Lady Smith) had reached a different conclusion, with which the Inner House of the Court of Session agreed on an appeal in North (2011 SLT 203). This Court agreed with the Inner House on this point. Lady Hale, with whom the other members of this Court, Lord Hope, Lord Wilson, Lord Reed and Lord Hughes, agreed, held that there was nothing in the statute to require it to be shown that the comparator had a realistic possibility of employment at the claimants’ establishment or even that it was feasible that he should be located there. Likewise, it was inappropriate to consider whether the terms and conditions of employment would then be adjusted: it followed that the Inner House should not have interfered with the employment tribunal’s decision that the core terms and conditions in the comparator’s collective bargaining agreement would continue to apply by going on to consider any consequential variations. These steps were unnecessary because the purpose of the “common terms” requirement in section 1(6) of the EPA 1970 was merely to ensure that employees at establishments of the same employer whose terms and conditions of employment were genuinely different for geographical or historical reasons were not used as comparators. The exercise required to be performed was a purely hypothetical exercise of asking whether, assuming that the comparator was employed to do his present job in the claimants’ establishment, the current core terms and conditions would apply. The exercise has since the North case become known as the “North hypothetical”.

26. Lady Hale summarised the principles to be drawn from the Leverton and British Coal cases as follows:

“12. The principles to be derived from these two cases are therefore plain. First, the ‘common terms and conditions’ referred to in section 1(6) are not those of, on the one hand, the women applicants and, on the other hand, their claimed comparators. They are, on the one hand, the terms and conditions under which the male comparators are employed at different establishments from the women and, on the other hand, the terms and conditions under which those male comparators are or would be employed if they were employed at the same establishment as the women. Second, by ‘common terms and conditions’ the subsection is not looking for complete correspondence between what those terms are, or would be, in the woman’s place of work. It is enough that they are, or would be, broadly similar. 13. It is also plain from the reasoning of both Lord Bridge in the Leverton case [1989] ICR 33 and Lord Slynn in the British Coal Corpn case [1996] ICR 515 that it is no answer to say that no such male comparators ever would be employed, on those or any other terms, at the same establishment as the women. Otherwise, it would be far too easy for an employer so to arrange things that only men worked in one place and only women in another. This point is of particular importance, now that women are entitled to claim equality with men who are doing completely different jobs, provided that the women are doing jobs of equal value. Those completely different jobs may well be done in completely different places from the jobs which the women are doing.”

27. At paras 30 and 34 of her judgment, Lady Hale explained that the fact that male and female workers had to work at different establishments did not bar an equal pay claim. Thus at para 30, she held:

“As Lord Slynn had recognised in British Coal Corpn v Smith [1996] ICR 515, the object of the legislation was to allow comparisons to be made between workers who did not and never would work in the same workplace. An example might be a manufacturing company, where the (female) clerical workers worked in an office block, whereas the (male) manufacturers worked in a factory.”

28. Lady Hale explained the limited purpose of the same employment test in section 1(6) of the EPA 1970:

“35. In the fourth place, it is not the function of the ‘same employment’ test to establish comparability between the jobs done. That comparability is established by the ‘like work’, ‘work rated as equivalent’ and ‘work of equal value’ tests. Furthermore, the effect of the deemed equality clause is to modify the relevant term of the woman’s contract so as not to be less favourable than a term of a similar kind in the contract under which the man is employed or to include a beneficial term in her contract if she has none (section 1(2)(a), (b) or (c) as the case may be). That modification is clearly capable of taking account of differences in the working hours or holiday entitlement in calculating what would be equally favourable treatment for them both. Moreover, the equality clause does not operate if a difference in treatment is genuinely due to a material factor other than sex (section 1(3)). The ‘same employment’ test should not be used as a proxy for those tests or as a way of avoiding the often difficult and complex issues which they raise (tempting though this may be for large employers faced with multiple claims such as these). Its function is to establish the terms and conditions with which the comparison is to be made. The object is simply to weed out those cases in which geography plays a significant part in determining what those terms and conditions are.”

29. The present case is the first case involving a cross-establishment comparison where the claimants and the comparators’ terms and conditions were not fixed on both sides by collective bargaining agreements: the claimants’ terms and conditions of employment are not governed by a collective bargaining agreement. Lord Bridge envisaged that the presence of a collective bargaining agreement would be a paradigm but not the sole situation in which a cross-establishment comparison could be made. It follows from North that the same tests apply, and that, where the North hypothetical test is applied, it needs to be shown that, on the hypothesis that the comparators’ employment is at the claimants’ establishment and vice versa, the terms which would be observed at the comparators’ and claimants’ establishments are broadly similar, but not necessarily identical. Moreover, Asda does not suggest that the North test is not engaged in this way.

30. In each of these three cases, the Appellate Committee and this Court adopted a robust, purposive approach. These cases further show that there can be “common terms” not only where the claimants and the comparators are employed under the same collective bargaining agreement but also where they are employed under different collective bargaining agreements.

...

32. ... It is not necessary for an employment tribunal to apply the North hypothetical if on the facts it is satisfied that there were common terms applying either “generally” or as between the relevant classes of employees (see section 1(6)). The North hypothetical is then unnecessary.

...

45. On Lord Pannick’s submission, the presence of different employment regimes was the end of the matter so far as common terms was concerned. I can deal with this point relatively shortly. It is clear that Lord Bridge did not go that far: he continued after the sentence already cited at para 43 above by saying that “In such cases”, ie if there were good reasons for having different employment regimes, then the common terms requirement would defeat the equal pay claims. The common terms requirement is only a threshold test and thus not a test to be used to exclude the possibility of a case where despite the presence of different establishments there is sufficient commonality of terms to mean that the claim should go to the next stage. As explained, the North hypothetical is now one way in which a sufficient degree of commonality can be achieved.

46. Moreover, it would be surprising if equal pay claims could be stopped in limine simply because the comparators were employees of predominantly one sex who were located in a separate establishment and had had the benefit of a collective bargaining agreement, negotiated on behalf of that particular group of employees alone. It is obvious that it may have come about with their interests in mind and without reference to the position of other employees of the other sex at a different establishment. As Mr Short QC, for the claimants, points out, the need to find common terms only applies if there are different establishments and that shows that the concern is with geography rather than employment regimes. Even a single collective bargaining agreement can introduce different employment regimes at the same location. Mr Short’s submissions, backed up as they are by the judgment of Lady Hale in North, to my mind make it very clear that the common terms requirement is intended to operate only within a very narrow compass where the differences in terms and conditions are wholly or mainly derived from the physical separation of the comparator’s establishment, and that it is not intended to prevent claims merely because as events have turned out there are different employment regimes.

47. Lord Pannick then proceeds to challenge the conclusion of the employment tribunal on the basis that common terms applied “generally” in the context of section 1(6). This, he submits, clearly means “generally as regards all employees” at both the comparators’ and the claimants’ establishment. I can also deal with this shortly. As the Court of Appeal recognised, it was not correct for the employment tribunal to direct itself that it had to find “common terms generally as between claimants and comparators” (Judgment, para 88). Therefore, this error invalidates the conclusion of the employment tribunal at para 210 of its decision that there were common terms “generally”. However, the employment tribunal did ask the relevant question at a later stage in its judgment. In my judgment, the employment tribunal asked the question on what terms would the distribution employees be employed if they were located at the claimants’ establishment and rejected the argument that they would be so employed on retail terms (see para 241, set out at para 40 above). This particular point does not therefore advance Asda’s case.

...

50. ... the employment tribunal was wrong to entertain a detailed, line by line comparison of terms. What the tribunal had to do was to make a broad comparison: see Lady Hale’s second principle in North, which draws on Leverton and Smith. The employment tribunal went on to apply that test as between the retail and distribution employees (see paras 212 to 217 of its decision). Mr Short submits that it would be too late for Asda to challenge this conclusion. The employment tribunal had left out of account rates of pay but these were the very terms alleged to be discriminatory and so they were properly left out of account. The other areas of difference in para 102 of the decision of the employment tribunal would not appear to be core terms and the employment tribunal clearly considered that they were not. In my judgment, however, the fact remains that the employment tribunal applied the test of broad similarity to the wrong groups. In any event the claimants succeed on the North hypothetical.

Lord Reed, Lord Hodge, Lord Lloyd-Jones and Lord Leggatt agreed.

== See also ==
- UK labour law
