= Merchant Shipping Act 1988 =

Act of the Parliament of the United Kingdom

Merchant Shipping Act 1988 (Note: Section 58(1).)
- Act of Parliament
- Parliament of the United Kingdom
- Long title: An Act to amend the law relating to the registration of ships; to make provision for the giving of financial assistance in connection with the training of seamen and crew relief costs; to make provision for the establishment of a Merchant Navy Reserve; to make further provision with respect to the safety of shipping, with respect to liability and compensation for oil pollution and with respect to the financing and administration of the lighthouse service; to make other amendments of the law relating to shipping, seamen and pollution; and for connected purposes.
- Citation: 1988 c. 12
- Territorial extent: England and Wales; Scotland (in part); Northern Ireland (in part); (Note: Section 58(5).)

Dates
- Royal assent: 3 May 1988
- Commencement: various (Note: Section 58(2).)
- Repealed: 26 May 2015

Other legislation
- Amends: Merchant Shipping Act 1906; Merchant Shipping (Oil Pollution) Act 1971; Merchant Shipping Act 1974; Merchant Shipping Act 1984
- Amended by: Merchant Shipping (Registration, etc.) Act 1993; Merchant Shipping Act 1995; Shipping and Trading Interests (Protection) Act 1995
- Repealed by: Deregulation Act 2015

Status: Repealed

Text of statute as originally enacted

Revised text of statute as amended

The Merchant Shipping Act 1988 (c. 12) was an act of the Parliament of the United Kingdom. It aimed to prevent foreign fishing fleets from fishing in British territorial waters. In the Factortame case, its provisions in Parts I and II, Registration of British Ships, were disapplied by the Judicial functions of the European court of justice when they were found to conflict with European Community law and the Common Fisheries Policy which stated British waters were the EUs too. Part II dealt only with fishing vessels and was found to be repugnant by the European Court of Justice. The subsequent definition of British Ships is found in the Merchant Shipping Act 1995.
