= Frederick Lawton (judge) =

British barrister and senior judge

The Right Honourable Sir Frederick Lawton

Lord Justice of Appeal
- In office 11 January 1972 – 21 December 1986
- Preceded by: Lord Justice Salmon

Justice of the High Court
- In office 9 January 1961 – 11 January 1972

Personal details
- Born: Frederick Horace Lawton; 21 December 1911 Camberwell, London, England
- Died: 3 February 2001 (aged 89) York, England
- Children: 2
- Education: Corpus Christi College, Cambridge

Sir Frederick Horace Lawton (21 December 1911 – 3 February 2001) was a British barrister and judge who served as Lord Justice of Appeal from 1972 to 1986.

== Early life and career ==
A supporter during the height of the Cambridge University Fascist Association, Lawton severed his ties with the British Union of Fascists on joining the army, set to fight Nazi Germany, in about 1940

Frederick Lawton was born in Wandsworth, London, the son of William John Lawton and Ethel, née Hanley. His father, a former insurance agent, had joined the Prison Service, and became Governor of Wandsworth Prison, the first prison governor to rise from the ranks. He was educated at Battersea Grammar School and then at Corpus Christi College, Cambridge, where he took first-class honours in part one of the History tripos and an upper second-class honours in part two of the Law tripos.

After flirting with Communism there, Lawton joined the British Union of Fascists and founded the Cambridge University Fascist Association. (Note: From 1936 he was adopted as the BUF's candidate who on any notice of poll would stand for Hammersmith North but no such notice was made as the forecast 1940 election was shelved due to the World War II.)

== Early legal career ==
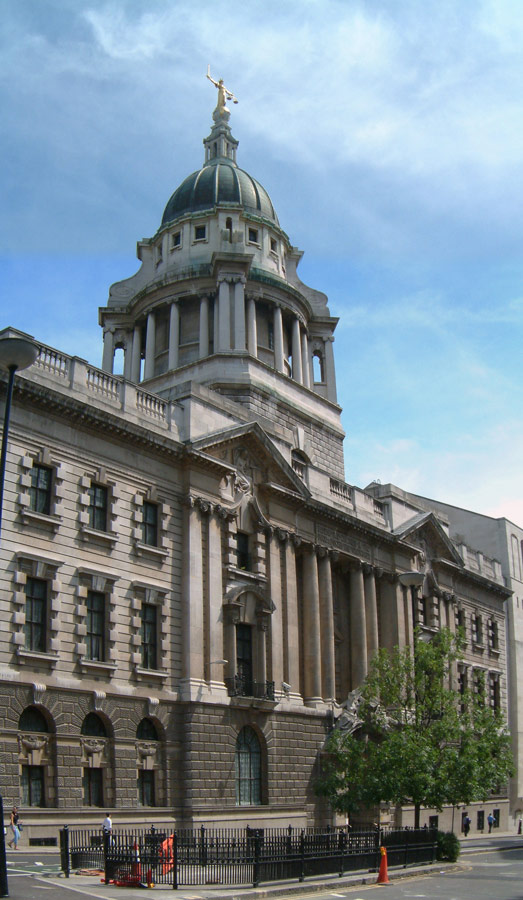
The Old Bailey remains the venue of the most high-profile trials locally and nationally

Lawton was called to the bar at the Inner Temple in 1935, and joined the chambers of Norman Birkett — 1 Brick Court. As a junior barrister, he defended members of the BUF charged under the Public Order Act 1936. Around that time he converted to Catholicism, which became an important part of his life.

On 4 August 1937 Lawton married Doreen Wilton (Note: died 1979) a typist and the daughter of a Prison Service clerical officer; they had two sons.

Lawton trained in the London Irish Rifles in World War II but was unfit for service after a training accident in 1941. He had ended his association with the Far Right and he later joined the Conservative Party. Resuming his practice at the bar, initially at Sir Edward Marshall Hall's 3 Temple Gardens, then at 5 King's Bench Walk.

He reached a new level of casework in 1942, when he defended Harry Dobkin, (Note: Of the four cases listed, this is one where the overall verdict went against Lawton's efforts) a fire-watcher who murdered his wife during the Blitz. He became known as a leading criminal barrister. He stood in civil matters, notably in defamation cases. Among his cases were the 1956 prosecution of the Soviet discus thrower Nina Ponomaryova for shoplifting, the defence of the train driver who drove into a stationary train in the 1957 Lewisham rail crash, and the 1959 defence of Guenther Podola, a seasoned criminal, who murdered a police man.

Lawton became a Queen's Counsel in 1957, and was appointed Recorder of Cambridge the same year. As such he was reportedly the highest earner at the criminal bar. He was highly regarded as a pupil master. Amongst his pupils were Margaret Thatcher and Robin Day.

== Judicial career ==
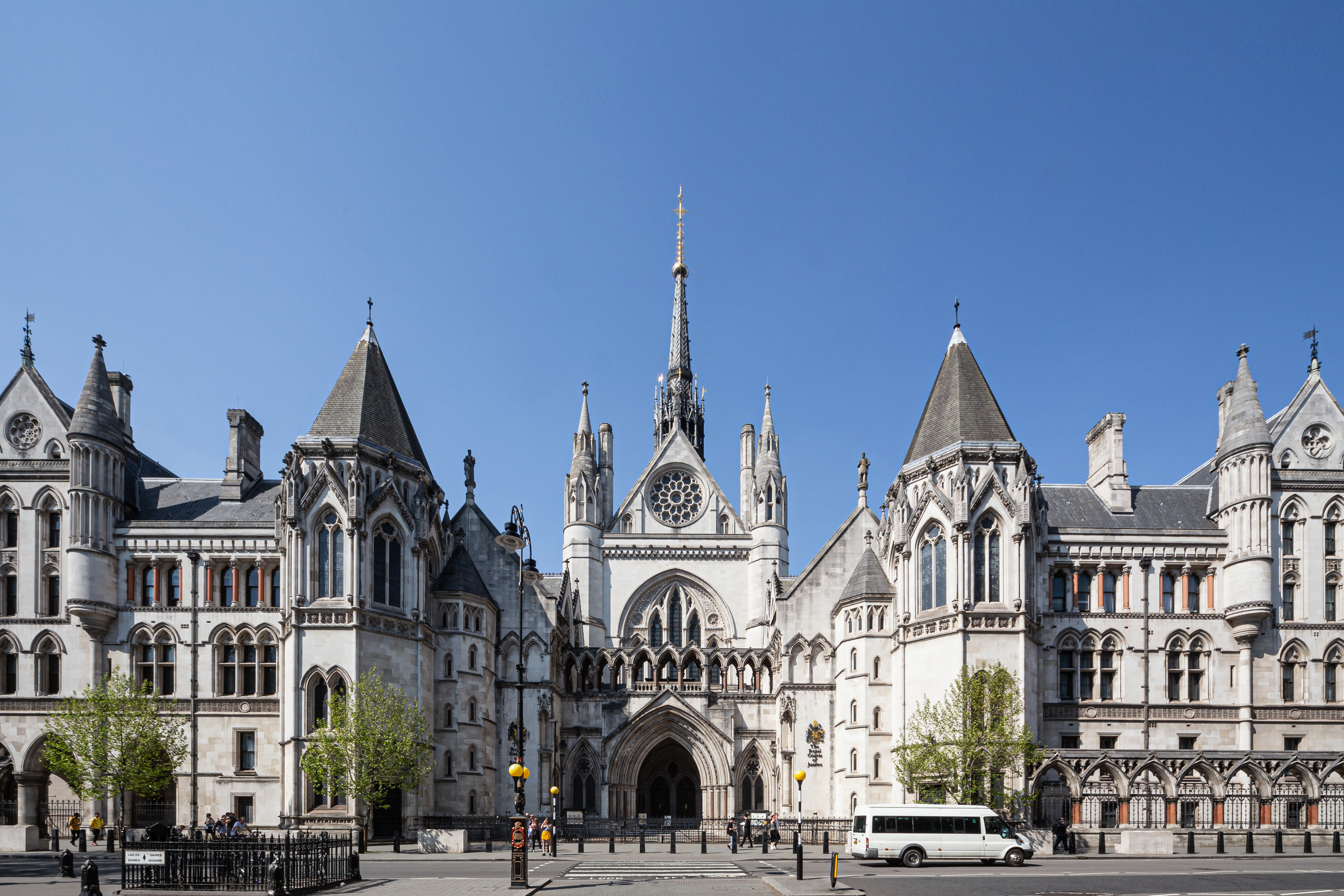
Royal Courts of Justice house the Court of Appeal and within its Victorian, neo-gothic, walls housed most of London's senior civil courts in this era

=== High Court ===
Lawton was appointed to the High Court of Justice in 1961, assigned to the Queen's Bench Division, and received the customary knighthood. In 1967, he oversaw the jury trial of the gangster Charlie Richardson (around whom the Richardson Gang was based). He sentenced him to 25 years' imprisonment. In 1969 he oversaw the trial of the rival gang the Kray Twins, who were convicted of two murders. For a third murder they were acquitted.

On the civil side, in 1964 Lawton presided over the high-profile libel case bought by Polish-born Dr Wladislaw Dering against the American novelist Leon Uris. As the case concerned certain events during the Holocaust some expressed doubt about Lawton's suitability for the case, given his former fascism. In the event, his adjudication prompted no adverse publicity. In 1970, he adjudged Broome v Cassell & Co Ltd, another high-profile libel trial as to certain events in World War II.

When adjudicating criminal matters, Lawton was regarded as efficient and fair, though prone to pass severe sentences in serious cases.

=== Court of Appeal ===
Lawton was appointed a Lord Justice of Appeal in 1972, and was sworn of the Privy Council. For a time Lawton often sat with Lord Denning and Lord Diplock on civil appeals: as the two frequently disagreed Lawton was often tasked with to deliver leading judgments in matters where he had little experience. In 1973, he criticised the Director of Public Prosecutions for offering Bertie Smalls, the first so-called "supergrass", immunity in exchange for his testimony. The law lords referred to the transaction as an "unholy deal", but allowed it to stand.

Lawton was influential in advocating sentencing guidelines and the expanded use of non-custodial sentences. He was a member of the Criminal Law Revision Committee from 1959 to 1985, and its chairman from 1977. On his appointment as chair, the barrister Louis Blom-Cooper described him as "the most knowledgeable and robust exponent of the criminal justice system as an effective instrument of social control".

Lawton retired in 1986.

== Stance and remarks ==
Sir Frederick made at least four socially divisive or claimed as exaggerative remarks, noted by reporters at the time:

- In 1967 he sentenced Charlie Richardson to serve 25 years for his conviction by jury for torture, amounting to grievous bodily harm, coupled with fraud and affray. He added "one is ashamed to live in a society that contains men like you".
- He more controversially opined "wife beating may be socially acceptable in Sheffield, but it is a different matter in Cheltenham".
- In 1981, when demonstrators for nuclear disarmament turned to violence, he remarked that "a good South Devon bull might work wonders" – the demonstrations took place in Cornwall nearby, with an early 19th century tradition of magistrates putting down riots fiercely.
- In 1987, after he retired, he complained of the difficulty prosecuting "the gyppos and tinkers who invade a farmer's land".

== Cases ==
In the Court of Appeal his reported decisions include:

Name	Type of opinion	Case status as precedent
Ward v Tesco Stores Ltd	Concurrence	Valid
Harris v Goddard	Concurrence	Valid (Note: But formal severance of a joint-tenancy asset is more likely now by common legal practice, which forbids unilateral transacting with the land, not relevant in this case)
Mascall v Mascall	Concurrence	Valid
Conservative and Unionist Central Office v Burrell	Concurrence	Valid
BP Exploration Co (Libya) Ltd v Hunt (No 2)	Concurrence	Valid
Multinational Gas and Petrochemical Co v Multinational Gas and Petrochemical Services Ltd	Concurrence	Valid
R v Quick	Concurrence	Valid
Re Vandervell's Trustees Ltd (No 2)	Concurrence	Valid
Butler Machine Tool Co Ltd v Ex-Cell-O Corp Ltd	Concurrence	Valid
Rose v Plenty	Dissent	Valid
Holwell Securities Ltd v Hughes	Concurrence	Valid
Macarthys Ltd v Smith	Concurrence	Superseded by own referral to ECJ which overruled ruling
R v Blaue	Concurrence	Valid
Clay Cross (Quarry Services) Ltd v Fletcher	Concurrence	Doubted
Spartan Steel & Alloys Ltd v Martin & Co (Contractors) Ltd	Concurrence	Valid

Lawton was also involved in the early appeals of the Guildford Four.

== Sources ==
- Obituary – The Daily Telegraph
- Obituary – The Guardian
