= Tesco Town =

Tesco Town is British slang for an area where one retailer has large market share. Although the term references the Tesco chain of stores, it can be used to describe any area dominated by one particular retailer.

In October 2009 the Competition Commission passed its proposal for a "competition test" on to the Department for Communities and Local Government. The test would ban from adding more space in an area, which it says will improve choice for shoppers by making it easier for rival grocers to open.

== Towns dominated by Tesco ==
=== Bedford ===
Bedford has been described as a Tesco town with the town having a Tesco for every 7,500 people.

=== Bicester ===
Bicester is one of the UK's best known Tesco-towns, operating five stores in a region with a population of 29,000. Featuring a Tesco superstore on the southern side of town, near the Bicester Village designer outlet, and a further four Tesco Express stores around the general neighbourhood and community areas.

Aldi and Lidl have also opened stores in the town recently.

In January 2015, Tesco announced the closure of their Tesco Metro store in Bicester, located directly opposite a Sainsbury's superstore.

=== Inverness ===
In 2007, it was reported that in Inverness, where there are currently four stores in the small city, Tesco had a 51% share of the market for groceries in the city, the highest rate of penetration for any locality in the UK.

=== Perth ===
In 2007 Tesco has a 60% market share in Perth.

=== Southall ===
In 2007 Tesco has a 58% market share in Southall.

=== Truro ===
In 2007 Tesco has a 53% market share in Truro.

=== Worcester ===
In Worcester, Tesco are viewed unfavourably by local press due to the alleged monopoly of the Tesco brand in the city. There are two large supermarkets less than three miles apart situated in the middle of two recently developed urban areas. In addition, there are five Tesco Express spread across the city, and there are another two medium-sized stores situated on the outskirts of the city, totalling 7 stores altogether.

There is only one Asda, one Morrisons, one Waitrose, and two medium sized Sainsbury's (and one Sainsbury's Local) in comparison to the high number of Tesco stores in Worcester.

== See also ==
- Criticism of Tesco
- Criticism of Walmart
- Monopoly
