= Holwell Securities Ltd v Hughes =

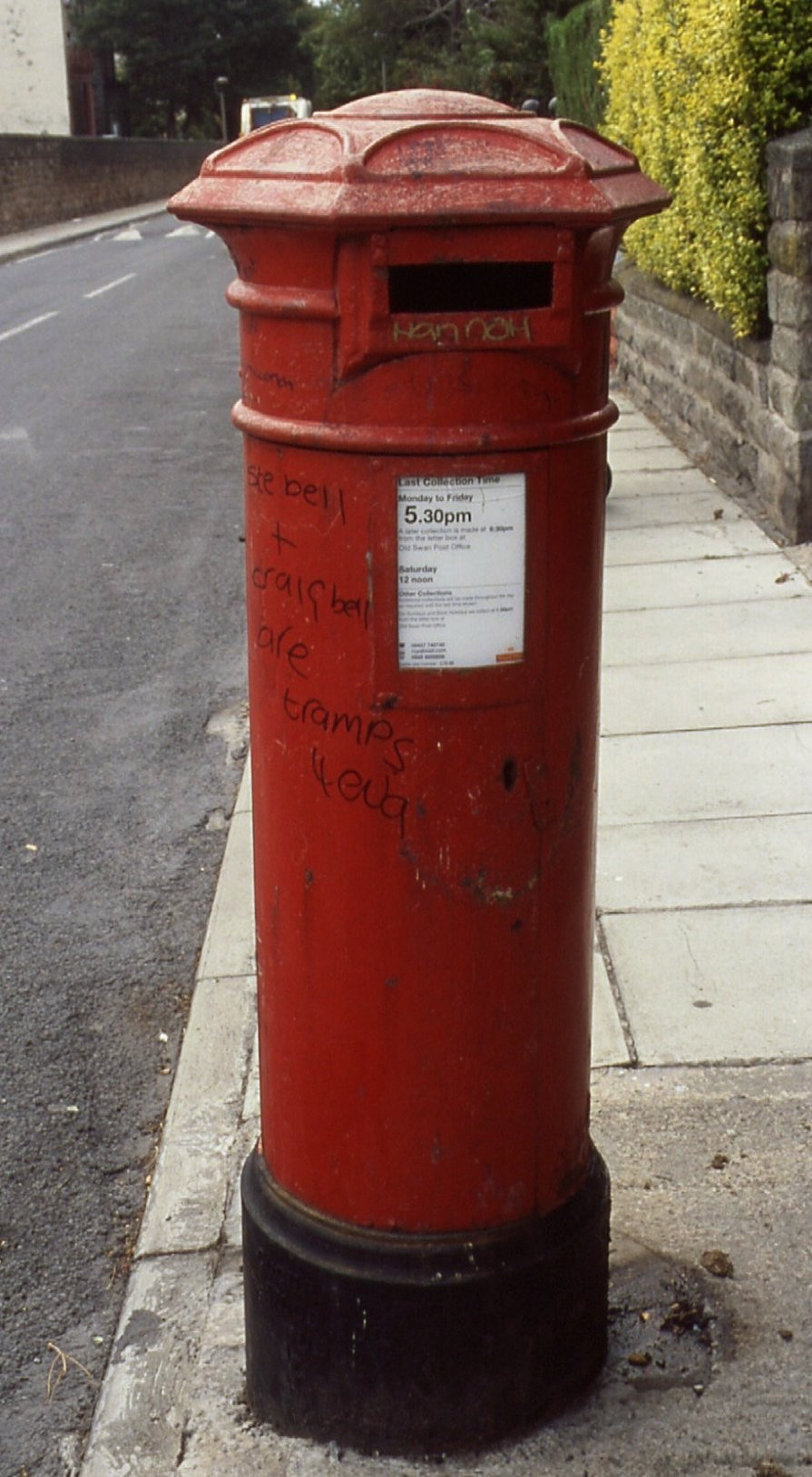
- Decided: 5 November 1973
- Citations: [1974] 1 WLR 155 [1974] 1 All ER 161

Case history
- Appealed from: [1971] 1 WLR 757

Court membership
- Judges sitting: Lawton LJ; Russell LJ; Buckley LJ

Keywords
- Offer and acceptance, postal rule

Holwell Securities Ltd v Hughes [1974] 1 WLR 155 is an English contract law case overriding the usual postal rule.

Ordinarily, a contractual offer can be deemed to be accepted when it leaves the offeree and enters the postal system but in this case, the original offer clearly stipulated the method by which acceptance was to take place, and this superseded the normal operation of postal rule.

== Facts ==
The defendant, Dr Hughes, had granted an option with respect to his property at 571 High Road, Wembley, to the claimants, Holwell Securities Ltd, giving the claimants the irrevocable right to purchase the property during the option period for the specified sum. It contained a clause stipulating that there must be notice (here, receipt of the offer) in writing within six months in order to exercise the option. The claimants sent a letter on 14 April 1972 purporting to exercise the option. It was lost in the mail and was never received by the defendant. The defendant then refused to complete upon the purchase and the claimants sought specific performance.

== Judgment ==
At first instance the claim was dismissed by Templeman J (reported at [1971] 1 WLR 757).

On appeal it was held, dismissing the appeal, that the postal acceptance rule does not apply in every case, even if the parties involved anticipate dealing by post and consider the post to be an acceptable means of communication.

Russell LJ applied the case of Hare v Nicholl [1966] 2 QB 130, and asserted on that authority that options represent a special case, and that the grantee (here, the plaintiff) must comply strictly with the conditions stipulated for exercise by the offeror (the defendant in this case). As this had not happened, the claim failed. He then went on to consider the position in relation to the postal rule generally (which he referred to as "the roundabout path to the same result"). In relation to this he concluded based upon earlier authorities that although the postal acceptance rule was a rule of general application, it did not apply when there are express terms in the offer which exclude it, and this includes excluding it by implication where the offer specifies that acceptance must reach the offeror.

The Court also suggested obiter dictum that the rule ought not to apply in cases where its application would produce manifest inconvenience and absurdity. More broadly, the Court states that the rule does not apply if when looking at all the circumstances, it is apparent that the parties could not have intended a binding agreement until notice of acceptance was communicated to the offeror.

Russell LJ added that although the parties had had a telephone conversation, this did not constitute the requisite notice of acceptance as laid out in the offer.

Lawton LJ gave a concurring judgment.

== Significance ==
This case set a precedent for overriding the postal rule.

== See also ==
- Agreement in English law
- Offer and acceptance
