= Shipping and Trading Interests (Protection) Act 1995 =

Act of the Parliament of the United Kingdom

Shipping and Trading Interests (Protection) Act 1995 (Note: Section 9(1).)
- Act of Parliament
- Parliament of the United Kingdom
- Long title: An Act to consolidate certain enactments for the protection of shipping and trading interests.
- Citation: 1995 c. 22
- Territorial extent: United Kingdom (Note: Section 9(5).)

Dates
- Royal assent: 19 July 1995
- Commencement: 1 January 1996 (Note: Section 9(4).)

Other legislation
- Amends: See § Repealed enactments
- Amended by: Treaty of Lisbon (Changes in Terminology) Order 2011; Legal Aid, Sentencing and Punishment of Offenders Act 2012 (Fines on Summary Conviction) Regulations 2015

Status: Amended

Text of statute as originally enacted

Revised text of statute as amended

Text of the Shipping and Trading Interests (Protection) Act 1995 as in force today (including any amendments) within the United Kingdom, from legislation.gov.uk.

The Shipping and Trading Interests (Protection) Act 1995 (c. 22) is an act of the Parliament of the United Kingdom that consolidated enactments related to the protection of shipping and trading interests in the United Kingdom.

== Provisions ==
=== Repealed enactments ===
Section 8 of the act repealed 3 enactments, listed in the schedule to the act.

Citation	Short title	Extent of repeal
1974 c. 43	Merchant Shipping Act 1974	Sections 14 and 15. Schedule 4.
1979 c. 39	Merchant Shipping Act 1979	Section 40(1)(b).
1988 c. 12	Merchant Shipping Act 1988	Sections 38, 39 and 40.
