= Éliane Vogel-Polsky =

Belgian lawyer and feminist

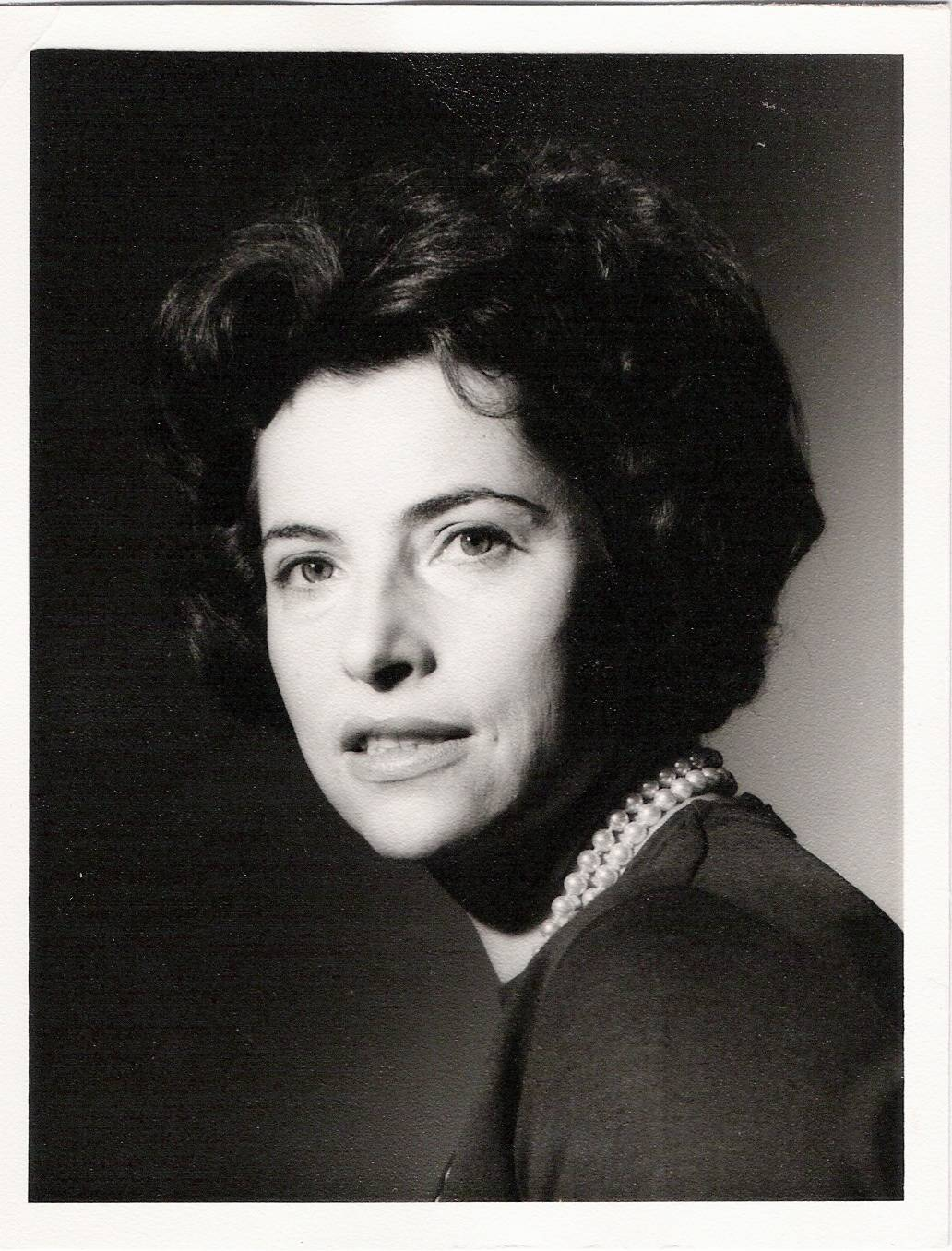
- Born: 5 July 1926; Ghent, Belgium
- Died: 13 November 2015 (aged 89); Brussels, Belgium

Éliane Vogel-Polsky (5 July 1926 – 13 November 2015) was a Belgian lawyer and feminist.

== Biography ==
Éliane Vogel-Polsky was born in Ghent on 5 July 1926, one of two daughters. Her parents were Russian Jews who had immigrated to Belgium after the end of the First World War. She attended the Lycée Émile Jacqmain but her education was interrupted by the Holocaust. The anti-Jewish regulations introduced by the German forces of occupation obliged Vogel-Polsky to finish school under a false name with the Benedictine sisters in Liège.

Vogel-Polsky enrolled at Saint-Louis University, Brussels for a preparatory law degree in 1944. On 7 July 1950 she graduated with a doctorate in law at the Université libre de Bruxelles; she was called to the bar the same year. During her doctorate she first met Marie-Thérèse Cuvelliez and Odette De Wynter. In 1952 with Cuvelliez she became the first woman to win the Janson Prize. In 1958 Vogel-Polsky obtained three degrees: international social law, comparative social law and community social law.

Vogel-Polsky was a strong feminist and in 1966 she supported the strike at FN Herstal and she began feminist studies in 1968. She taught four courses on Belgian labour, social security, international social law and comparative social law and in European social law in 1975. In 1969 she joined the Faculty of Law at the ULB and became a professor in 1991. Though she was best known for her defense of women's rights Vogel-Polsky was a labour law expert and article 119 of the Treaty of Rome is nicknamed Eliane's article. She was also the lawyer in the Defrenne v Sabena (No 2) case about age discrimination. In 1992 she was awarded an honorary doctorate from the University of Lleida in Spain for her teaching career.

Vogel-Polsky married lawyer André Albert Vogel and they had 3 children: Jean, Laurent and Alain. They had a company but Vogel-Polsky found it frustrating that she was often sidelined as a woman. Aged 90, she died in Brussels on 13 November 2015.

In 2020, Vogel-Polsky was chosen to be the Patron de Promotion of the 2021-2022 class at the College of Europe by the rector Federica Mogherini, the former High Representative of the Union for Foreign Affairs and Security Policy.
