= R v Quick =

1973 English criminal case

R v Quick [1973] QB 910 is an English criminal case, as to sane automatism and the sub-category of self-inducement of such a state. The court ruled that it may not be used as a defence if the defendant's loss of self-control was on the part of negligence in consuming or not consuming something which someone ought to but the jury must be properly directed so as to make all relevant findings of fact. The ruling stresses that automatism is usually easily distinct from insanity, in the few cases where the lines are blurred it is a complex problem for prosecutors and mental health professionals.

William G.H. Quick was a nurse in a mental hospital, charged with assaulting a patient. He claimed that he had been acting involuntarily as a result of common hypoglycaemia of diabetics, induced by an over-generous insulin and he had not neutralised its effects with food, which made him violently aggressive. The trial judge ruled that this constituted insanity, not automatism. Rather than risk the stigma of an acquittal on such grounds and a likely imposed treatment plan with loss of employment, the defendant changed his plea to guilty, got a conviction, and then appealed arguing he was not negligent in reaching a state of automatism whilst in a position of responsibility. The court noted alike incidences often are appealed to seek to re-argue non-negligence and thus evade criminal liability. At appeal it was ruled that the trial judge was mistaken, and that diabetic hypoglycaemia was induced by an external factor, and therefore gave rise to automatism, not insanity. The indicted facts should never had been reinterpreted as indicating insanity. The appeal court added if the hypoglycaemia were self-induced through negligence, it would not have been a defence. The jury in Bristol Crown Court were so badly directed that the conviction and that of the allied appeal would be quashed.

Lawton LJ, in his per curiam judgment:

...a self-induced incapacity will not excuse ... nor will one which could have been reasonably foreseen as a result of either doing or omitting to do something, for example, taking alcohol against medical advice after using certain prescribed drugs or failing to have regular meals while taking insulin.

... Such malfunctioning of his mind as there was, was caused by an external factor and not by a bodily disorder in the nature of a disease which disturbed the working of his mind. It follows in our judgment that Quick was entitled to have his defence of automatism left to the jury and that Mr. Justice Bridge's ruling as to the effect of the medical evidence called by him was wrong. Had the defence of automatism been left to the jury, a number of questions of fact would have had to be answered. If he was in a confused mental condition, was it due to a hypoglycaemic episode or to too much alcohol? If the former, to what extent had he brought about his condition by not following his doctor's instructions about taking regular meals? Did he know that he was getting into a hypoglycaemic episode? If yes, why did he not use the antidote of eating a lump of sugar as he had been advised to do? On the evidence which was before the jury Quick might have had difficulty in answering these questions in a manner which would have relieved him of responsibility for his acts. We cannot say, however, with the requisite degree of confidence, that the jury would have convicted him. It follows that his conviction must be quashed on the ground that the verdict was unsatisfactory.

This case is critically contrasted by legal scholars with R v Hennessy, where hyperglycaemia (an excess of blood sugar caused by not taking insulin) was considered by the court to be a disease of the mind under the M'Naghten rules.
