= Ward v Tesco Stores Ltd. =

1976 English tort law case

Ward v Tesco Stores Ltd
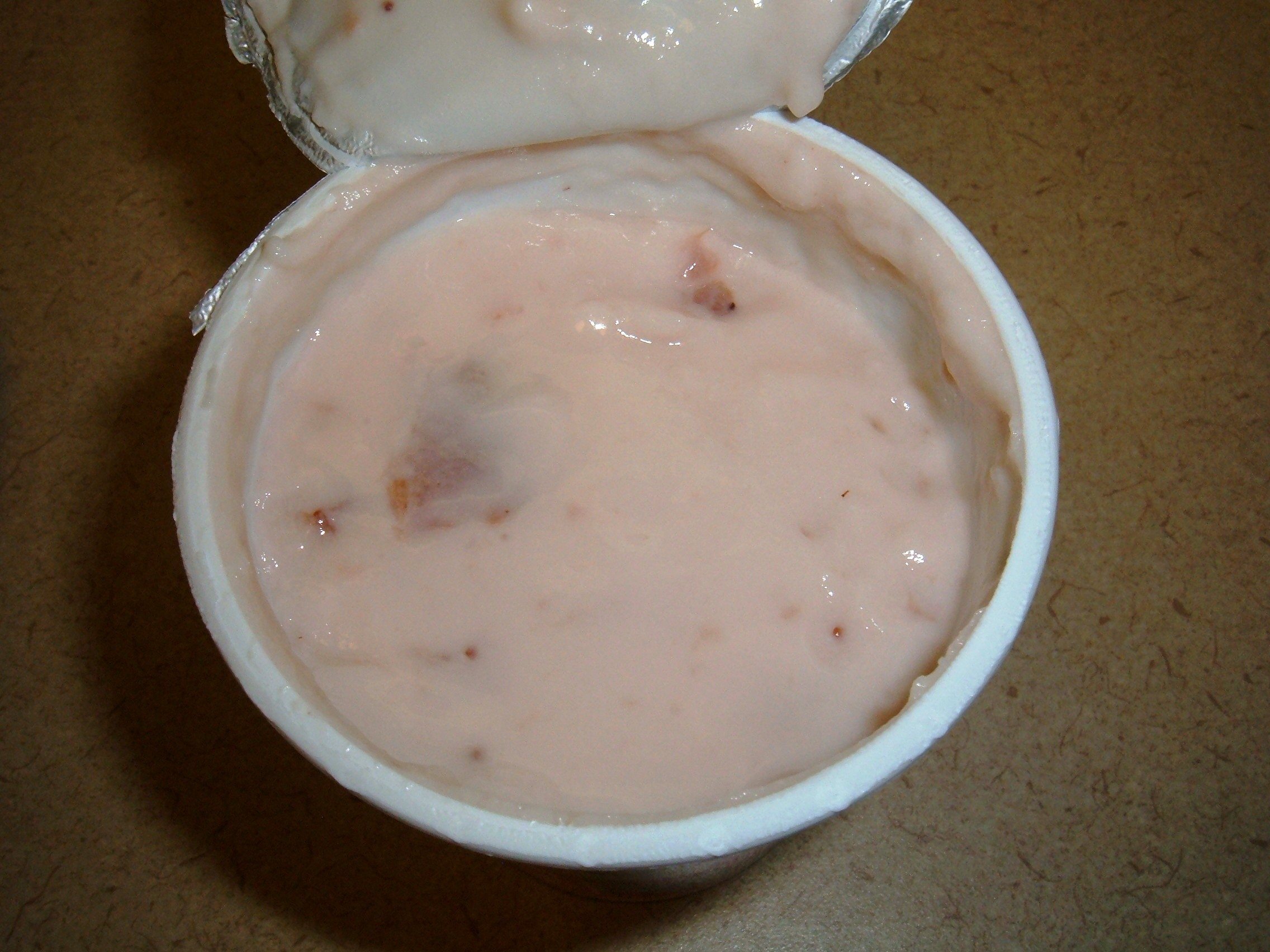
- The plaintiff slipped on pink yoghurt in a Tesco store.
- Court: Court of Appeal
- Full case name: Ward v Tesco Stores Limited
- Citation: [1976] 1 WLR 810, [1976] 1 All ER 219, [1976] IRLR 92

Court membership
- Judges sitting: Ormrod LJ (dissenting), Lawton LJ and Megaw LJ

Keywords
- Occupiers' liability, negligence

Ward v. Tesco Stores Ltd [1976] 1 WLR 810, is an English tort law case concerning the doctrine of res ipsa loquitur ("the thing speaks for itself"). It deals with the law of negligence and it set an important precedent in so called "trip and slip" cases which are a common occurrence.

== Facts ==
The plaintiff slipped on some pink yoghurt in a Tesco store in Smithdown Road, Liverpool. It was not clear whether or not Tesco staff were to blame for the spillage. It could have been another customer, or the wind, or anything else. Spillages happened roughly 10 times each week and staff had standing orders to clean anything up straight away. As Lawton LJ observed in his judgment,

A member of the staff helped to pick the plaintiff up. The manager was called. The plaintiff was taken to his office. She was dealt with there in a kindly and considerate way. The defendants offered to, and did, arrange for such of her clothes as had been soiled by the fall to be cleaned. That was all the plaintiff was able to prove, save for one additional fact. About three weeks later when she was shopping in the same store she noticed that some orange squash had been spilt on the floor. She kept an eye on the spillage for about a quarter of an hour. During that time nobody came to clear it up.

The trial judge had held in Mrs Ward's favour and she was awarded £137.50 in damages. Tesco appealed.

== Judgment ==
It was held by a majority (Lawton LJ and Megaw LJ) that even though it could not be said exactly what happened, the pink yoghurt being spilled spoke for itself as to who was to blame. Tesco was required to pay compensation. The plaintiff did not need to prove how long the spill had been there, because the burden of proof was on Tesco. Lord Justice Lawton's judgment examined the previous case law, starting with Richards v. WF White & Co.:

"A dock labourer who was working on a ship in dock which was being unloaded slipped on a patch of oil and injured himself. At the material time between 300 and 400 men in various trades were working on the ship. In the course of his judgment Devlin J said. at p 369:

“If there had been evidence which showed that there was some danger, not perhaps of oil but some other danger, which was being left on the ship for two or three days, or anything of that sort, which the shipowners were doing nothing about, a prima facie case of negligence would be made out; but to make out a prima facie case of negligence in a case of this sort, there must, I think, be some evidence to show how long the oil had been there, some evidence from which it can be inferred that a prudent shipowner, who had a reasonable system of inspection for the purpose of seeing that dangers of this sort were not created, ought to have noticed it.”

That case was decided on its own facts. I doubt whether Devlin J intended to make any general statement of principle. If he did. I would not agree with what he said. This case, too, has to be decided on its own facts, to which established principles must be applied. The relevant principles were enunciated in the classical judgment of Erle CJ in Scott v. London and St Katharine Docks Co. (1865) 3 H&C 596, 601:

“where the thing is shown to be under the management of the defendant or his servants, and the accident is such as in the ordinary course of things does not happen if those who have the management use proper care, it affords reasonable evidence, in the absence of explanation by the defendants that the accident arose from want of care.”

Now, in this case the floor of this supermarket was under the management of the defendants and their servants. The accident was such as in the ordinary course of things does not happen if floors are kept clean and spillages are dealt with as soon as they occur. If an accident does happen because the floors are covered with spillage, then in my judgment some explanation should be forthcoming from the defendants to show that the accident did not arise from any want of care on their part; and in the absence of any explanation the judge may give judgment for the plaintiff. Such burden of proof as there is on defendants in such circumstances is evidential, not probative. The judge thought that prima facie this accident would not have happened had the defendants taken reasonable care. In my judgment he was justified in taking that view because the probabilities were that the spillage had been on the floor long enough for it to have been cleaned up by a member of the staff.

The next question is whether the defendants by their evidence gave any explanation to show that they had taken all reasonable care. The only explanation which they gave was that to which I have already referred. The judge weighed the evidence and decided as a matter of fact from which in this case there can be no appeal that the precautions taken were not enough, and that the plaintiff in consequence had proved her case. In coming to that conclusion he followed the judgment of Lord Goddard, CJ in Turner v. Arding & Hobbs Ltd. [1949] 2 All ER 911 Lord Goddard said, at p 912:

“The duty of the shopkeeper in this class of case is well-established. It may be said to be a duty to use reasonable care to see that the shop floor, on which people are invited, is kept reasonably safe, and if an unusual danger is present of which the injured person is unaware, and the danger is one which would not be expected and ought not to be present, the onus of proof is on the defendants to explain how it was that the accident happened.”

It is clear from a later passage in his judgment that Lord Goddard CJ, in referring to the burden of proof, was not saying that the defendants had to disprove negligence. What he had intended to say is apparent from what he said later on the same page:

“Here, however, I think that there is a burden thrown on the defendants either of explaining how this thing got to the floor or giving me far more evidence than they have as to the state of the floor and the watch that was kept on it immediately before the accident.”

The judge had that passage in mind when he decided as he did. In my judgment he was right; and accordingly I would dismiss this appeal."

== Dissent ==
Ormrod LJ disagreed with Lawton LJ and Megaw LJ on the basis that Tesco did not seem to have been able to do anything to have prevented the accident. He argued that they did not fail to take reasonable care, and in his words, the accident "could clearly have happened no matter what degree of care these defendants had taken".
