= Macarthys Ltd v Smith =

- Court: European Court of Justice
- Citations: [1980] Case 129/79, [1980] ECR 1275

Case history
- Prior action: [1979] 3 All ER 325
- Subsequent actions: [1980] EWCA Civ 7, [1981] QB 180

Court membership
- Judges sitting: Lord Denning MR; Lawton LJ; Cumming-Bruce LJ

Keywords
- EU supremacy, sex discrimination

Macarthys Ltd v Smith (1980) Case 129/79 is an EU law, UK constitutional law and UK labour law case, concerning the construction of a sex discrimination statute, and its compatibility with European treaties, now in the European Union.

== Facts ==
Ms Wendy Smith worked for Macarthys Ltd in their factory. She was paid £50 a week, but a man who had previously worked in the same job for the company had been paid £60 a week. Ms Smith claimed this was unlawful according either to the Equal Pay Act 1970, or the Treaty of the European Community article 119. The company argued she had no claim because the UK's Equal Pay Act 1970 did not allow comparisons with former colleagues. Ms Smith argued that, if this was true under UK law, then European Community law did allow such a comparison, and it would override the UK statute.

== Judgment ==
=== Court of Appeal ===
A majority held that Ms Smith had no claim because the EC treaties could not be used as an aid to interpreting UK law. Lord Denning MR dissented, and said that it could. He went on as follows.

Thus far I have assumed that our Parliament, whenever it passes legislation, intends to fulfil its obligations under the Treaty. If the time should come when our Parliament deliberately passes an Act with the intention of repudiating the Treaty or any provision in it or intentionally of acting inconsistently with it and says so in express terms then I should have thought that it would be the duty of our courts to follow the statute of our Parliament. I do not however envisage any such situation. As I said in Blackburn v Attorney General ([1971] 2 All ER 1380 at 1383, [1971] 1 WLR 1037 at 1040): 'But if Parliament should do so, then I say we will consider that event when it happens.' Unless there is such an intentional and express repudiation of the Treaty, it is our duty to give priority to the Treaty. In the present case I assume that the United Kingdom intended to fulfil its obligations under art 119.

A reference for a preliminary ruling was then made to the ECJ.

=== European Court of Justice ===
The ECJ held that Ms Smith had a claim because she could compare her pay with a former colleague, thus approving Lord Denning MR's dissent on the interpretation of the UK Act. The ECJ explained the equal work

11. In such a situation the decisive test lies in establishing whether there is a difference in treatment between a man and a woman performing "equal work" within the meaning of article 119. The scope of that concept, which is entirely qualitative in character in that it is exclusively concerned with the nature of the services in question, may not be restricted by the introduction of a requirement of contemporaneity’.

[...]

14. The second question put by the Court of Appeal and expressed in terms of alternatives concerns the framework within which the existence of possible discrimination in pay may be established. This question is intended to enable the court to rule upon a submission made by the employee and developed by her before the European Court of Justice to the effect that a woman may claim not only the salary received by a man who previously did the same work for her employer but, also, more generally, the salary to which she would be entitled were she a man, even in the absence of any man who was concurrently performing, or had previously performed, similar work. The respondent in the main action defined this term of comparison by reference to the concept of what she described as 'a hypothetical male worker'.

15. It is clear that the latter proposition, which is the subject of question 2(a), is to be classed as indirect and disguised discrimination, the identification of which, as the Court explained in the Defrenne judgment, cited above, implies comparative studies of entire branches of industry and therefore requires, as a prerequisite, the elaboration by the Community and national legislative bodies of criteria of assessment. From that it follows that, in cases of actual discrimination falling within the scope of the direct application of Article 119, comparisons are confined to parallels which may be drawn on the basis of concrete appraisals of the work actually performed by employees of different sex within the same establishment or service.

=== Court of Appeal ===
Lord Denning MR, Lawton LJ and Cumming-Bruce LJ ordered Macarthys to pay costs to fulfil the order of the ECJ.

== See also ==
- UK labour law
- EU law
