= Defrenne v Sabena (No 2) =

1976 European Union law case

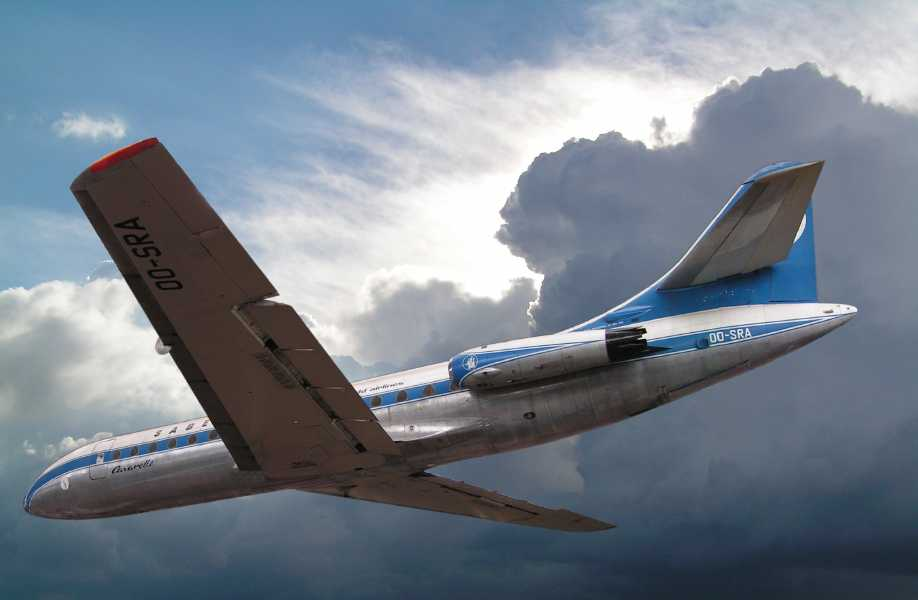
- Court: European Court of Justice
- Decided: 8 Apr 1976
- Citations: (1976) Case 43/75, [1976] ECR 455, [1976] ICR 547, [1981] 1 All ER 122

Keywords
- Equality, social, economic

Defrenne v Sabena (No 2) (1976) Case 43/75 is a foundational European Union law case, concerning direct effect and the European Social Charter in the European Union. It held that the EU:

is not merely an economic union, but is at the same time intended, by common action, to ensure social progress and seek the constant improvement of the living and working conditions of their people...

The case was championed by the Belgian lawyer Éliane Vogel-Polsky, who was responsible for much of the heavy involvement in sex discrimination law of the time by the European Court of Justice.

== Facts ==
A woman named Gabrielle Defrenne worked as a flight attendant for the Belgian national airline Sabena. Under Belgian law, female flight attendants were obliged to retire at the age of 40, unlike their male counterparts. Defrenne had been forced to retire from Sabena in 1968. Defrenne complained that the lower pension rights this entailed violated her right to equal treatment on grounds of gender under article 119 of the Treaty of the European Community, (now Article 157 of the Treaty on the Functioning of the European Union (TFEU) – prior to the Lisbon Treaty, this was article 141 TEC).

== Judgment ==
The European Court of Justice held that article 119 of the Treaty of the European Community was of such a character as to have horizontal direct effect, and therefore enforceable not merely between individuals and the government, but also between private parties. Article 157 TFEU (119 TEEC, 141 TEC) was invoked which stated "Each Member State shall ensure that the principle of equal pay for male and female workers for equal work or work of equal value is applied"

8. Article 119 pursues a double aim.

9. First, in the light of the different stages of the development of social legislation in the various member states, the aim of article 119 is to avoid a situation in which undertakings established in states which have actually implemented the principle of equal pay suffer a competitive disadvantage in intra-community competition as compared with undertakings established in states which have not yet eliminated discrimination against women workers as regards pay.

10. Secondly, this provision forms part of the social objectives of the community, which is not merely an economic union, but is at the same time intended, by common action, to ensure social progress and seek the constant improvement of the living and working conditions of their people, as is emphasized by the Preamble to the Treaty.

11. This aim is accentuated by the insertion of article 119 into the body of a charter devoted to social policy whose preliminary provision, article 117, marks, 'the need to promote improved working conditions and an improved standard of living for workers, so as to make possible their harmonization while the improvement is being maintained'.

12. This double aim, which is at once economic and social, shows that the principle of equal pay forms part of the foundations of the Community.

[...]

39. The prohibition on discrimination between men and women applies not only to the action of public authorities, but also extends to all agreements which are intended to regulate paid labour collectively, as well as to contracts between individuals.

== Significance ==
This, further to the case of Van Gend en Loos, identified the horizontal and vertical direct effect of Treaty provisions which could be invoked in national courts and hence they would be bound to protect individual rights.

== See also ==
- P v S and Cornwall County Council
- United Kingdom labour law
- European labour law

== References and sources ==
Sources

- Chalmers, Damian; Davies, Gareth; Monti, Giorgio (2011). European Union Law (2nd ed.). UK: Cambridge University Press. p. 271. ISBN 0-521-12151-5.
