= Law of the European Union =

European Union law is a system of supranational laws operating within the 27 member states of the European Union (EU). Originally referred to as Community law, it has grown over time since the 1952 founding of the European Coal and Steel Community, to promote peace, social justice, a social market economy with full employment, and environmental protection. The Treaties of the European Union agreed to by member states form its constitutional structure. EU law is interpreted by, and EU case law is created by, the judicial branch, known collectively as the Court of Justice of the European Union.

Legal Acts of the EU are created by a variety of EU legislative procedures involving the popularly elected European Parliament, the Council of the European Union (which represents member governments), the European Commission (a cabinet which is elected jointly by the Council and Parliament) and sometimes the European Council (composed of heads of state). Only the Commission has the right to propose legislation.

Legal acts include regulations, which are automatically enforceable in all member states; directives, which typically become effective by transposition into national law; decisions on specific economic matters such as mergers or prices which are binding on the parties concerned, and non-binding recommendations and opinions. Treaties, regulations, and decisions have direct effect – they become binding without further action, and can be relied upon in lawsuits. EU laws, especially Directives, also have an indirect effect, constraining judicial interpretation of national laws. Failure of a national government to faithfully transpose a directive can result in courts enforcing the directive anyway (depending on the circumstances), or punitive action by the Commission. Implementing and delegated acts allow the Commission to take certain actions within the framework set out by legislation (and oversight by committees of national representatives, the Council, and the Parliament), the equivalent of executive actions and agency rulemaking in other jurisdictions.

New members may join if they agree to follow the rules of the union, and existing states may leave according to their "own constitutional requirements". The withdrawal of the United Kingdom resulted in a body of retained EU law copied into the legal systems of England and Wales, Scotland and Northern Ireland.

== History ==
After the economic and human devastation of World War II, European civil society was determined to create a lasting union to guarantee world peace through economic, social and political integration.

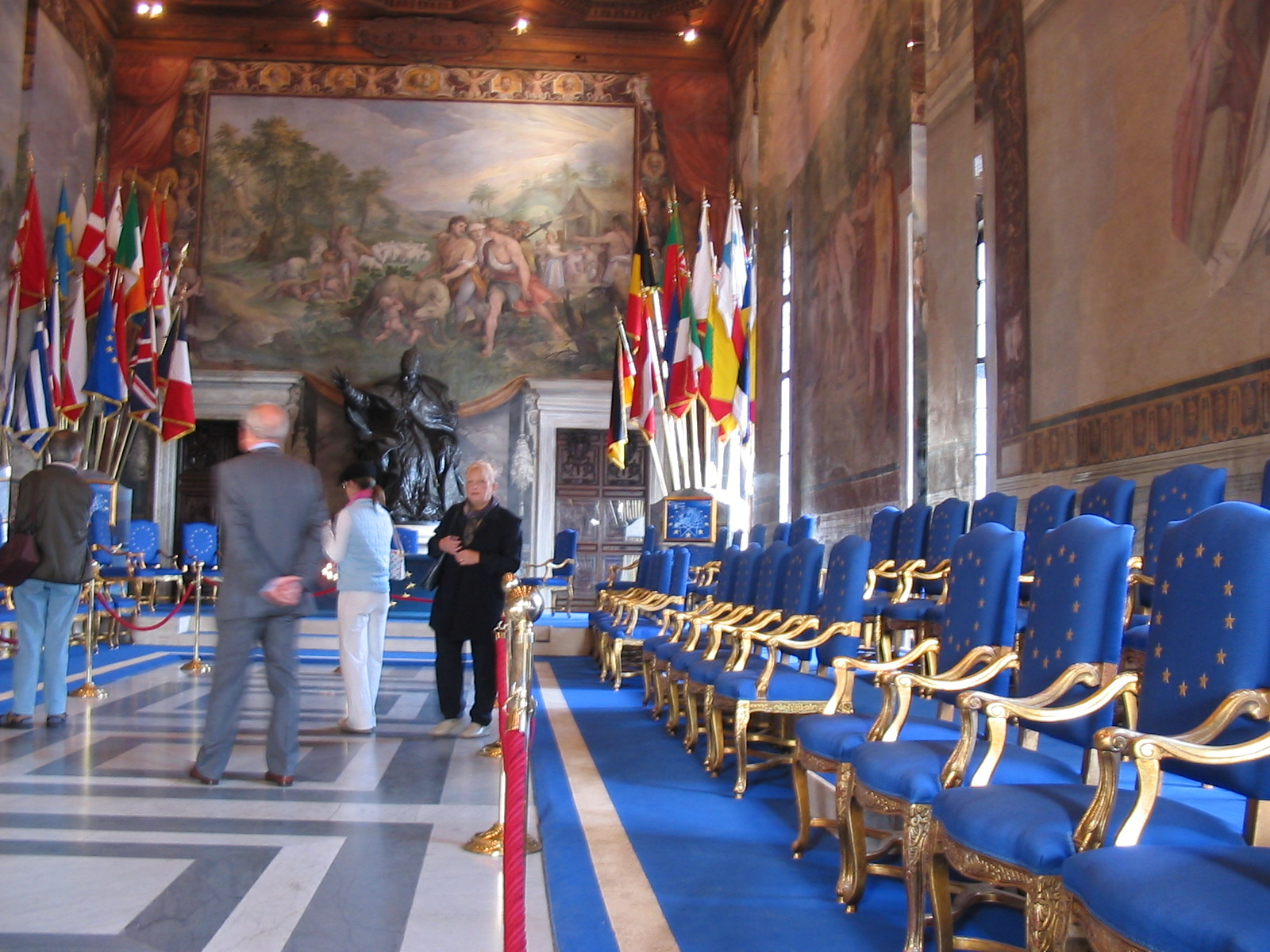
The Treaty of Rome, signed in Musei Capitolini was the first international treaty that envisaged social, economic and political integration, within limited fields, for nation-states.

To "save succeeding generations from the scourge of war, which twice.. brought untold sorrow to mankind", the United Nations Charter was passed in 1945, and the Bretton Woods Conference set up a new system of integrated World Banking, finance and trade. Also, the Council of Europe, formed by the Treaty of London 1949, adopted a European Convention on Human Rights, overseen by a new transnational court in Strasbourg in 1950. Already in 1946, Winston Churchill, who had been defeated as UK Prime Minister in 1945, had called for a "United States of Europe", though this did not mean the UK would sever its ties to the Commonwealth. In 1950, the French Foreign Minister Robert Schuman proposed that, beginning with integration of French and German coal and steel production, there should be "an organisation open to the participation of the other countries of Europe", where "solidarity in production" would make war "not merely unthinkable, but materially impossible". The 1951 Treaty of Paris created the first European Coal and Steel Community (ECSC), signed by France, West Germany, Belgium, the Netherlands, Luxembourg and Italy, with Jean Monnet as its president. Its theory was simply that war would be impossibly costly if ownership and production of every country's economy was mixed together. It established an Assembly (now the European Parliament) to represent the people, a Council of Ministers for the member states, a Commission as the executive, and a Court of Justice to interpret the law. In the East, the Soviet Union had installed dictatorial governments, controlling East Germany, and the rest of Eastern Europe. Although Stalin died in 1953 and the new general secretary Nikita Khrushchev had denounced him in 1956, Soviet tanks crushed a democratic Hungarian Revolution of 1956, and repressed every other attempt of its people to win democracy and human rights.

The EU evolved from the Coal and Steel Community of 6 member states, to a union of 28 member states in 2013. A referendum in the UK led to the UK leaving the bloc in 2020, reducing the total number of member states back to 27.

In the West, the decision was made through the 1957 Treaty of Rome to launch the first European Economic Community. It shared the Assembly and Court with the Coal and Steel Community, but set up parallel bodies for the Council and Commission. Based on the Spaak Report of 1956, it sought to break down all barriers to trade in a common market for goods, services, labour and capital, and prevent distortion of competition and regulate areas of common interest like agriculture, energy and transport. A separate treaty was signed for a European Atomic Energy Community to manage nuclear production. In 1961 the United Kingdom, Denmark, Ireland and Norway applied for membership only to be vetoed in 1963 by France's Charles de Gaulle. Spain also applied and was rejected as it was still led by the Franco dictatorship. The same year, the Court of Justice proclaimed that the Community constituted a "new legal order of international law". The Merger Treaty finally placed the ECSC and Euratom within the EEC. Shortly after, de Gaulle boycotted the commission, which he believed was pressing supranationalism too far. The Luxembourg compromise in 1966 agreed that France (or other countries) could veto issues of "very important national interest", particularly relating to the Common Agricultural Policy, instead of making decisions by "qualified majority". But after the May 1968 events in France and de Gaulle's resignation, the way was free for the United Kingdom, Ireland, and Denmark to join in 1973. Norway had rejected joining in a 1972 referendum, while the UK confirmed its membership in a 1975 referendum.

Aside from the European Economic Community itself, the European continent underwent a profound transition towards democracy. The dictators of Greece and Portugal were deposed in 1974, and Spain's dictator died in 1975, enabling their accession in 1981 and 1986. In 1979, the European Parliament had its first direct elections, reflecting a growing consensus that the EEC should be less a union of member states, and more a union of peoples. The 1986 Single European Act increased the number of treaty issues in which qualified majority voting (rather than consensus) would be used to legislate, as a way to accelerate trade integration. The Schengen Agreement of 1985 (not initially signed by Italy, the UK, Ireland, Denmark or Greece) allowed movement of people without any border checks. Meanwhile, in 1987, the Soviet Union's Mikhail Gorbachev announced policies of "transparency" and "restructuring" (glasnost and perestroika). This revealed the depths of corruption and waste. In April 1989, the People's Republic of Poland legalised the Solidarity organisation, which captured 99% of available parliamentary seats in June elections. These elections, in which anti-communist candidates won a striking victory, inaugurated a series of peaceful anti-communist revolutions in Central and Eastern Europe that eventually culminated in the fall of communism. In November 1989, protestors in Berlin began taking down the Berlin Wall, which became a symbol of the collapse of the Iron Curtain, with most of Eastern Europe declaring independence and moving to hold democratic elections by 1991.

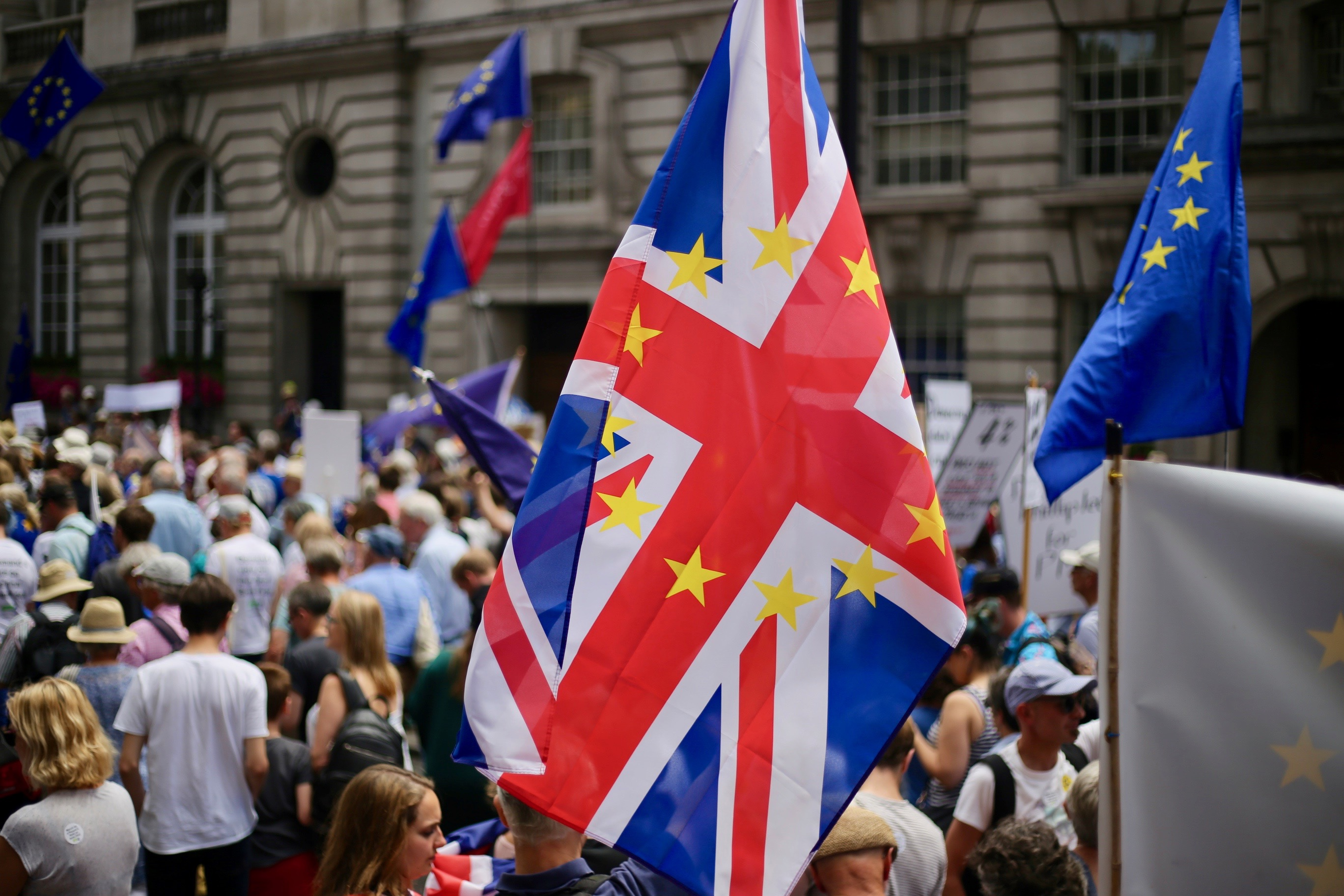
After the 2016 Brexit referendum, there were protests both for and against the UK leaving the EU and there was considerable division on how Brexit should be enacted. Britain finally left the union in 2020, where the government opted to limit the relationship to an international free trade agreement. Unlike most over member states, the UK was – as is – notably influenced by common and not civil law

The Maastricht Treaty renamed the EEC as the "European Union", and expanded its powers to include a social chapter, set up a European Exchange Rate Mechanism, and limit government spending. The UK initially opted out of the social provisions, and then monetary union after Black Wednesday in September 1992 where speculators bet against the British currency. Sweden, Finland and Austria joined in 1995, but Norway again chose not to do so after its 1994 referendum, instead remaining part of the European Free Trade Area (EFTA) and thus the European Economic Area (EEA), abiding by most EU law but without any voting rights. At the Treaty of Amsterdam, with a new Labour government, the UK joined the social chapter. A newly confident EU then sought to expand. First, the Treaty of Nice made voting weight more proportionate to population. Second, the Euro currency went into circulation in 2002. Third came the accession of Malta, Cyprus, Slovenia, Poland, the Czech Republic, Slovakia, Hungary, Latvia, Estonia, and Lithuania. Fourth, in 2005 a Treaty establishing a Constitution for Europe was proposed. This proposed "constitution" was largely symbolic, but was rejected by referendums in France and the Netherlands. Most of its technical provisions were inserted into the Treaty of Lisbon, without the emotive symbols of federalism or the word "constitution". In the same year, Bulgaria and Romania joined.

During the subprime mortgage crisis and the 2008 financial crisis, European banks that were invested in derivatives were put under severe pressure. British, French, German, and other governments were forced to turn some banks into partially or wholly state-owned banks. Some governments instead guaranteed their banks' debts. In turn, the European debt crisis developed when international investment withdrew and Greece, Spain, Portugal, and Ireland saw international bond markets charge unsustainably high interest rates on government debt. Eurozone governments and staff of the European Central Bank believed that it was necessary to save their banks by taking over Greek debt, and impose "austerity" and "structural adjustment" measures on debtor states. This exacerbated further contraction in the economies. In 2011 two new treaties, the European Fiscal Compact and European Stability Mechanism were signed among the nineteen Eurozone states. In 2013, Croatia entered the union. However a further crisis was triggered after the UK's Conservative government chose to hold a referendum in 2016, and campaigners for "leave" (or "Brexit") won 51.89 per cent of votes on a 72.2 per cent turnout. This referendum was politically inconclusive given the UK's system of Parliamentary sovereignty, with no agreement after the 2017 election, until the 2019 general election brought a Conservative majority with a manifesto commitment to drive through Brexit. The UK left EU membership in February 2020, with uncertain economic, territorial and social consequences.

== Constitutional law ==
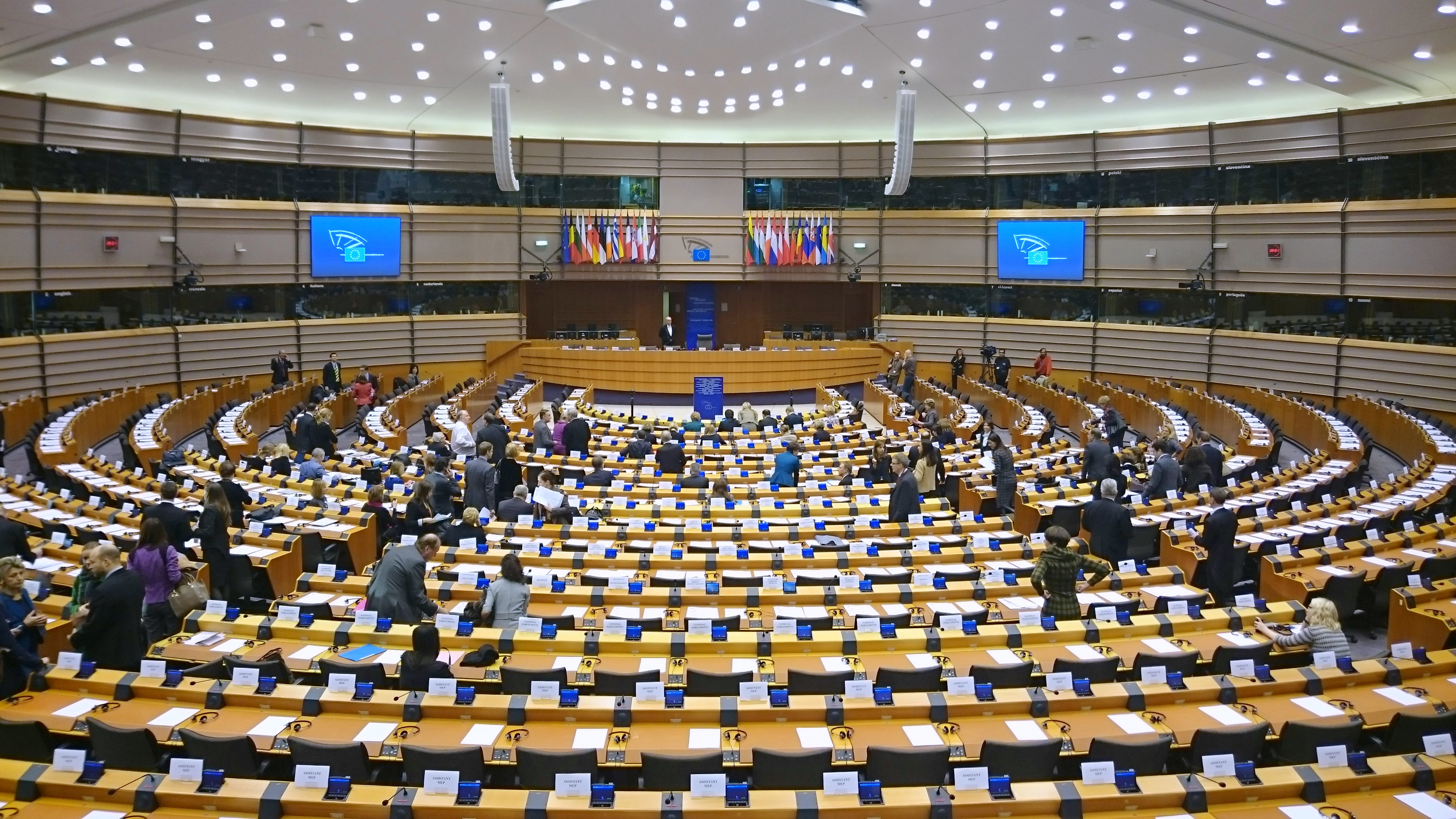
The European Parliament, elected by EU citizens, makes new laws with the Commission and Council. To address the EU's asserted "democratic deficit", Parliament increasingly assumed more rights in the legislative process. Proposals have not yet been adopted to allow it to initiate legislation, require the commission to be from the Parliament, and reduce the power of the Court of Justice.

Although the European Union does not have a codified constitution, (Note: In 2005, a Treaty establishing a Constitution for Europe was rejected by referendums in France and the Netherlands) like every political body it has laws which "constitute" its basic governance structure. (Note: This is similar to the United Kingdom. See AW Bradley and KD Ewing, Constitutional and Administrative Law (2012) ch 1 and W Bagehot, The English Constitution (1867)) The EU's primary constitutional sources are the Treaty on European Union and the Treaty on the Functioning of the European Union, which have been agreed or adhered to among the governments of all 27 member states. The Treaties establish the EU's institutions, list their powers and responsibilities, and explain the areas in which the EU can legislate with Directives or Regulations. In 1983, the European Court of Justice has referred to the Treaties as being a "basic constitutional charter" for the first time. The European Commission has the right to propose new laws, formally called the right of legislative initiative. During the ordinary legislative procedure, the Council (whose members are ministers from member state governments) and the European Parliament (elected by citizens) can make amendments and must give their consent for laws to pass.

The Commission oversees departments and various agencies that execute or enforce EU law. The "European Council" (rather than the Council of the European Union, made up of different government Ministers) is composed of the Prime Ministers or executive presidents of the member states. It appoints the Commissioners and the board of the European Central Bank. The European Court of Justice is the supreme judicial body which interprets EU law, and develops it through precedent. The Court can review the legality of the EU institutions' actions, in compliance with the Treaties. It can also decide upon claims for breach of EU laws from member states and citizens.

=== Treaties ===
Eurozone participation European Union member states (special territories not shown) 21 in the eurozone 1 in ERM II, with an opt-out (Denmark) 5 not in ERM II, but committed to join the eurozone after meeting the convergence criteria (Czech Republic, Hungary, Poland, Romania, and Sweden) Non–EU member states 4 using the euro with a monetary agreement (Andorra, Monaco, San Marino, and Vatican City) 2 using the euro unilaterally (Kosovo and Montenegro)

The Treaty on European Union (TEU) and the Treaty on the Functioning of the European Union (TFEU) are the two main sources of EU law. Representing agreements between all member states, the TEU focuses more on principles of democracy, human rights, and summarises the institutions, while the TFEU expands on all principles and fields of policy in which the EU can legislate. In principle, the EU treaties are like any other international agreement, which will usually be interpreted according to principles codified by the Vienna Convention 1969. It can be amended by unanimous agreement at any time, but TEU itself, in article 48, sets out an amendment procedure through proposals via the Council and a Convention of national Parliament representatives. Under TEU article 5(2), the "principle of conferral" says the EU can do nothing except the things which it has express authority to do. The limits of its competence are governed by the Court of Justice, and the courts and Parliaments of member states. Under TEU article 6(1), the Charter of Fundamental Rights of the European Union (CFR) has the same legal value as the Treaties (TEU & TFEU). It does not, however, extend the competences of the EU. It serves as a set of fundamental rights which all EU legislation has to respect, whether it is an EU institution or a member state which executes those laws.

As the European Union has grown from 6 to 27 member states, a clear procedure for accession of members is set out in TEU article 49. The European Union is only open to a "European" state which respects the principles of "human dignity, freedom, democracy, equality, the rule of law, and respect for human rights, including the rights of persons belonging to minorities". Countries whose territory is wholly outside the European continent cannot therefore apply, (Note: Island territories geographically outside the EU, but politically within include Madeira, the Canary Islands and the French overseas departments. The Faroe Islands are expressly excluded from EU law. Specific provisions are made for others, like Åland, and Saint-Pierre-et-Miquelon.) although Malta and Cyprus (which sit entirely on the African or Asian continental plates) have been accepted as members. Nor can any country without fully democratic political institutions which ensure standards of "pluralism, non-discrimination, tolerance, justice, solidarity and equality between women and men prevail". Article 50 says any member state can withdraw in accord "with its own constitutional requirements", by negotiated "arrangements for its withdrawal, taking account of the framework for its future relationship with the Union". This indicates that the EU is not entitled to demand a withdrawal, and that member states should follow constitutional procedures, for example, through Parliament or a codified constitutional document. Once article 50 is triggered, there is a two-year time limit to complete negotiations, a procedure which would leave a seceding member without any bargaining power in negotiations, because the costs of having no trade treaty would be proportionally greater to the individual state than the remaining EU bloc.

Article 7 allows member states to be suspended for a "clear risk of a serious breach" of values in article 2 (for example, democracy, equality, human rights) with a four-fifths vote of the Council of the European Union, and the consent of the Parliament. Within the treaties' framework, sub-groups of member states may make further rules that only apply to those member states who want them. For example, the Schengen Agreements of 1985 and 1990 allow people to move without any passport or ID checks anywhere in the EU, but did not apply to the UK or Ireland. During the European debt crisis, the Treaty Establishing the European Stability Mechanism 2012 and the Treaty on Stability, Co-ordination and Governance 2012 (the "Fiscal Compact") were adopted only for member states who had the Euro (i.e. not Denmark, Sweden, the UK, Poland, Czech Republic, Hungary, Romania or Bulgaria). This required, among other things, a pledge to balance the government budget and limit structural deficits to 0.5 per cent of GDP, with fines for non-compliance. The jurisdiction for these rules remains with the Court of Justice.

=== Executive institutions ===
The European Commission is the main executive body of the European Union. Article 17(1) of the Treaty on European Union states the commission should "promote the general interest of the Union" while Article 17(3) adds that Commissioners should be "completely independent" and not "take instructions from any Government". Under Article 17(2), "Union legislative acts may only be adopted on the basis of a Commission proposal, except where the Treaties provide otherwise". This means that the commission has a monopoly on initiating the legislative procedure, although the council or Parliament are the "de facto catalysts of many legislative initiatives".

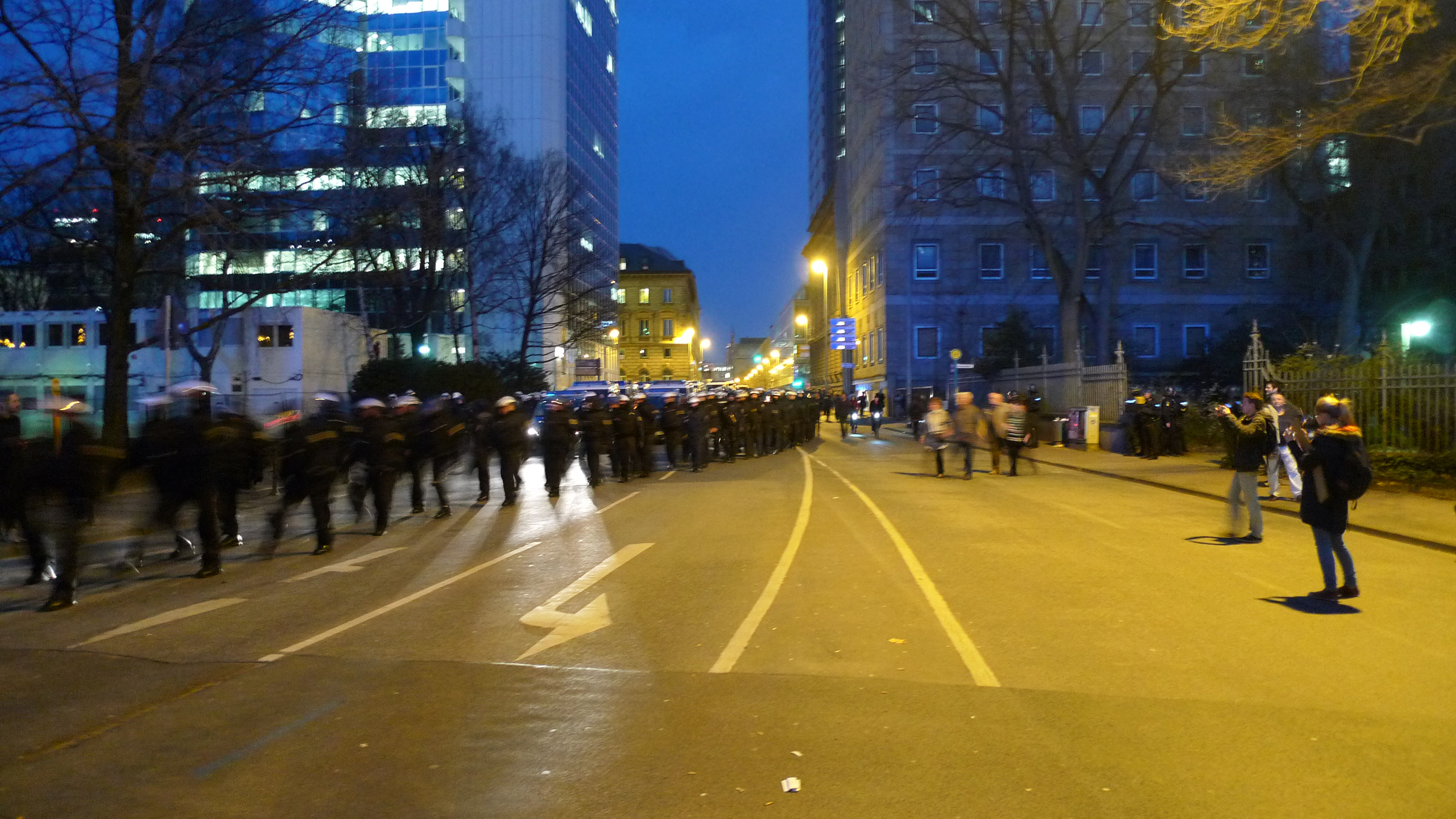
The European Central Bank, whose Frankfurt headquarters opened in 2015, exercises executive control within its monetary policy powers. It was targeted by the Blockupy movement for its role in the European debt crisis.

The commission's President (as of 2021 Ursula von der Leyen) sets the agenda for its work. Decisions are taken by a simple majority vote, often through a "written procedure" of circulating the proposal and adopting it if there are no objections. In response to Ireland's initial rejection of the Treaty of Lisbon, it was agreed to keep the system of one Commissioner from each of the member states, including the President and the High Representative for Foreign and Security Policy (currently Josep Borrell) The Commissioner President is elected by the European Parliament by an absolute majority of its members, following the parliamentary elections every five years, on the basis of a proposal by the European Council. The latter must take account of the results of the European elections, in which European political parties announce the name of their candidate for this post. Hence, in 2014, Juncker, the candidate of the European People's Party which won the most seats in Parliament, was proposed and elected.

The remaining commissioners are appointed by agreement between the president-elect and each national government, and are then, as a block, subject to a qualified majority vote of the council to approve, and majority approval of the Parliament. The Parliament can only approve or reject the whole commission, not individual commissioners but conducts public hearings with each of them prior to its vote, which in practice often triggers changes to individual appointments or portfolios. TFEU art 248 says the president may reshuffle commissioners, though this is uncommon, without member state approval. A proposal that the commissioners be drawn from the elected Parliament, was not adopted in the Treaty of Lisbon, though in practice several invariable are, relinquishing their seat in order to serve. Commissioners have various privileges, such as being exempt from member state taxes (but not EU taxes), and having immunity from prosecution for doing official acts. Commissioners have sometimes been found to have abused their offices, particularly since the Santer Commission was censured by Parliament in 1999, and it eventually resigned due to corruption allegations. This resulted in one main case, Commission v Edith Cresson where the European Court of Justice held that a Commissioner giving her dentist a job, for which he was clearly unqualified, did in fact not break any law. By contrast to the ECJ's strictly legalistic approach, a Committee of Independent Experts found that a culture had developed where few Commissioners had 'even the slightest sense of responsibility'. This led to the creation of the European Anti-fraud Office. In 2012, it investigated the Maltese Commissioner for Health, John Dalli, who quickly resigned after allegations that he received a €60m bribe in connection with a Tobacco Products Directive.

Beyond the commission, the European Central Bank has relative executive autonomy in its conduct of monetary policy for the purpose of managing the euro. It has a six-person board appointed by the European Council, on the Council's recommendation. The president of the council and a commissioner can sit in on ECB meetings, but do not have voting rights.

=== Legislature ===
The Parliament is elected each five years, aspiring to the "principle of equality of its citizens". Its power is limited compared to the Commission and Council.

While the Commission has a monopoly on initiating legislation, the European Parliament and the Council of the European Union have powers of amendment and veto during the legislative process. According to the Treaty on European Union articles 9 and 10, the EU observes "the principle of equality of its citizens" and is meant to be founded on "representative democracy". In practice, equality and democracy are still in development because the elected representatives in the Parliament cannot initiate legislation against the commission's wishes, citizens of smallest countries have greater voting weight in Parliament than citizens of the largest countries, and "qualified majorities" or consensus of the council are required to legislate. This "democratic deficit" has encouraged numerous proposals for reform, and is usually perceived as a hangover from earlier days of integration led by member states. Over time, the Parliament gradually assumed more voice: from being an unelected assembly, to its first direct elections in 1979, to having increasingly more rights in the legislative process. Citizens' rights are therefore limited compared to the democratic polities within all European member states: under TEU article 11, citizens and associations have the right to publicise their views and the right to submit an initiative that must be considered by the Commission if it has received at least one million signatures. TFEU article 227 contains a further right for citizens to petition the Parliament on issues which affect them.

Parliament elections, take place every five years, and votes for Members of the European Parliament (MEP) in member states must be organised by proportional representation or a single transferable vote. There are 750 MEPs and their numbers are "degressively proportional" according to member state size. This means – although the council is meant to be the body representing member states – in the Parliament citizens of smaller member states have more voice than citizens in larger member states. (Note: Germany 96. France 74. UK and Italy 73. Spain 54. Poland 51. Romania 31. Netherlands 26. Belgium, Czech Republic, Greece, Hungary, Portugal 21. Sweden 20. Austria 18. Bulgaria 17. Denmark, Slovakia, Finland 13. Ireland, Croatia, Lithuania 11. Latvia, Slovenia 8. Estonia, Cyprus, Luxembourg, Malta 6.) MEPs divide, as they do in national Parliaments, along political party lines: the conservative European People's Party is currently the largest, and the Party of European Socialists leads the opposition. Parties do not receive public funds from the EU, as the Court of Justice held in Parti écologiste "Les Verts" v European Parliament that this was entirely an issue to be regulated by the member states. The Parliament's powers include calling inquiries into maladministration or appoint an Ombudsman pending any court proceedings. It can require the Commission respond to questions and by a two-thirds majority can censure the whole Commission (as happened to the Santer Commission in 1999). In some cases, the Parliament has explicit consultation rights, which the Commission must genuinely follow. However its participation in the legislative process still remains limited because no member can actually or pass legislation without the Commission and Council, meaning power ("kratia") is not in the hands of directly elected representatives of the people ("demos"): in the EU it is not yet true that "the administration is in the hands of the many and not of the few".

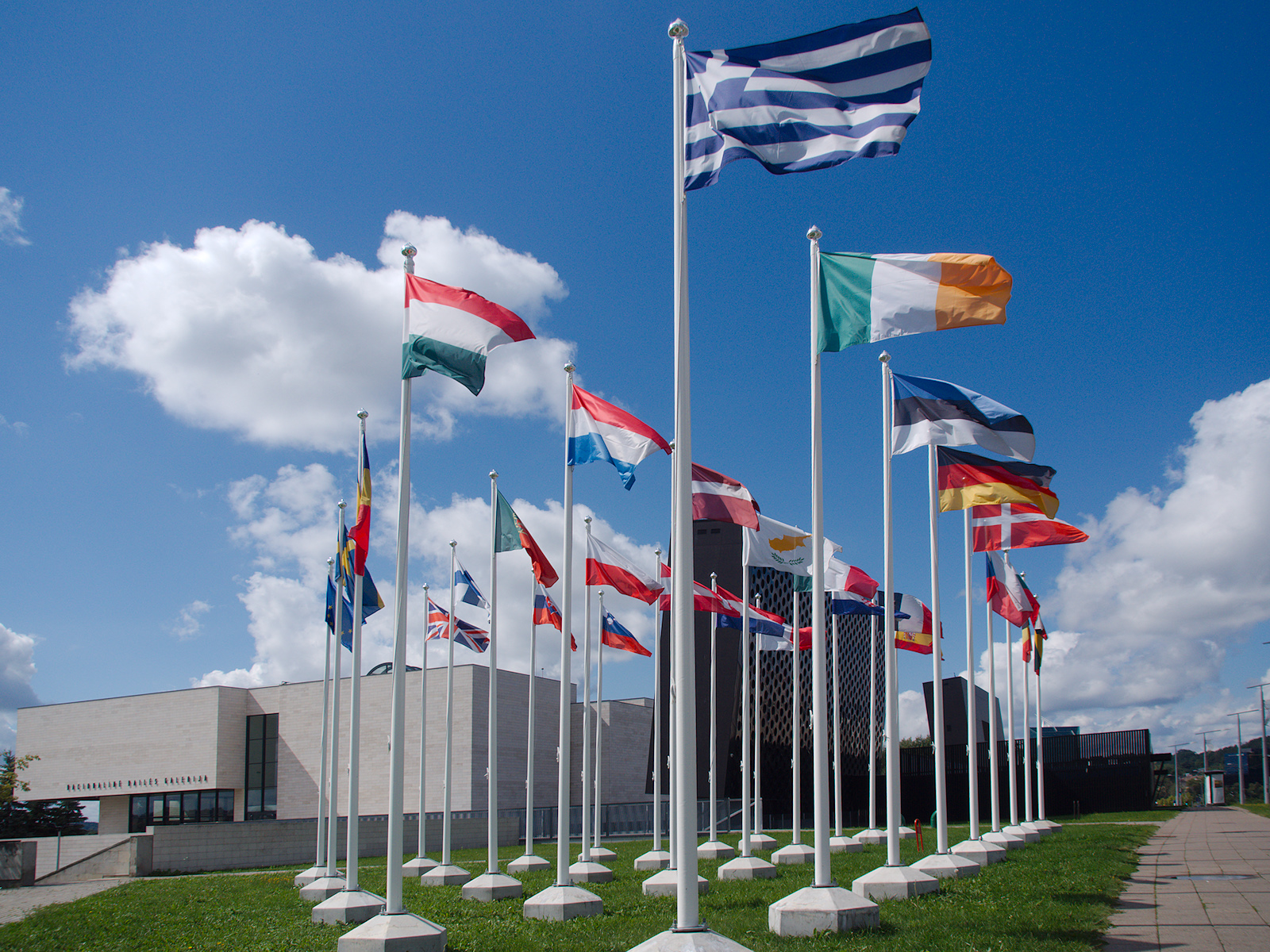
Member states are represented by Ministers in the Council during the legislative procedures. In addition the "European Council", which is the heads of member state governments, is meant to guide the EU's general political direction.

The second main legislative body is the Council of the European Union, which is composed of different ministers of the member states. The heads of government of member states also convene a "European Council" (a distinct body) that the TEU article 15 defines as providing the 'necessary impetus for its development and shall define the general political directions and priorities'. It meets each six months and its President (currently former Belgian Prime Minister Charles Michel) is meant to 'drive forward its work', but it does not itself exercise 'legislative functions'. The Council does this: in effect this is the governments of the member states, but there will be a different minister at each meeting, depending on the topic discussed (e.g. for environmental issues, the member states' environment ministers attend and vote; for foreign affairs, the foreign ministers, etc.). The minister must have the authority to represent and bind the member states in decisions. When voting takes place it is weighted inversely to member state size, so smaller member states are not dominated by larger member states. (Note: Before Brexit, the numbers were Germany, France, Italy, and UK: 29 votes each. Spain and Poland: 27. Romania: 14. Netherlands: 13. Belgium, Czech Republic, Greece, Hungary, Portugal: 12. Bulgaria, Austria, Sweden: 10. Denmark, Ireland, Croatia, Lithuania, Slovakia, Finland: 7. Estonia, Cyprus, Latvia, Luxembourg, Slovenia: 4. Malta: 3. This was set by the 2014 Protocol No 36 on Transitional Provisions, art 3(3) amended by art 20 for Croatia Accession Treaty 2011.) In total there are 352 votes, but for most acts there must be a qualified majority vote, if not consensus. TEU article 16(4) and TFEU article 238(3) define this to mean at least 55 per cent of the Council members (not votes) representing 65 per cent of the population of the EU: currently this means around 74 per cent, or 260 of the 352 votes. This is critical during the legislative process.

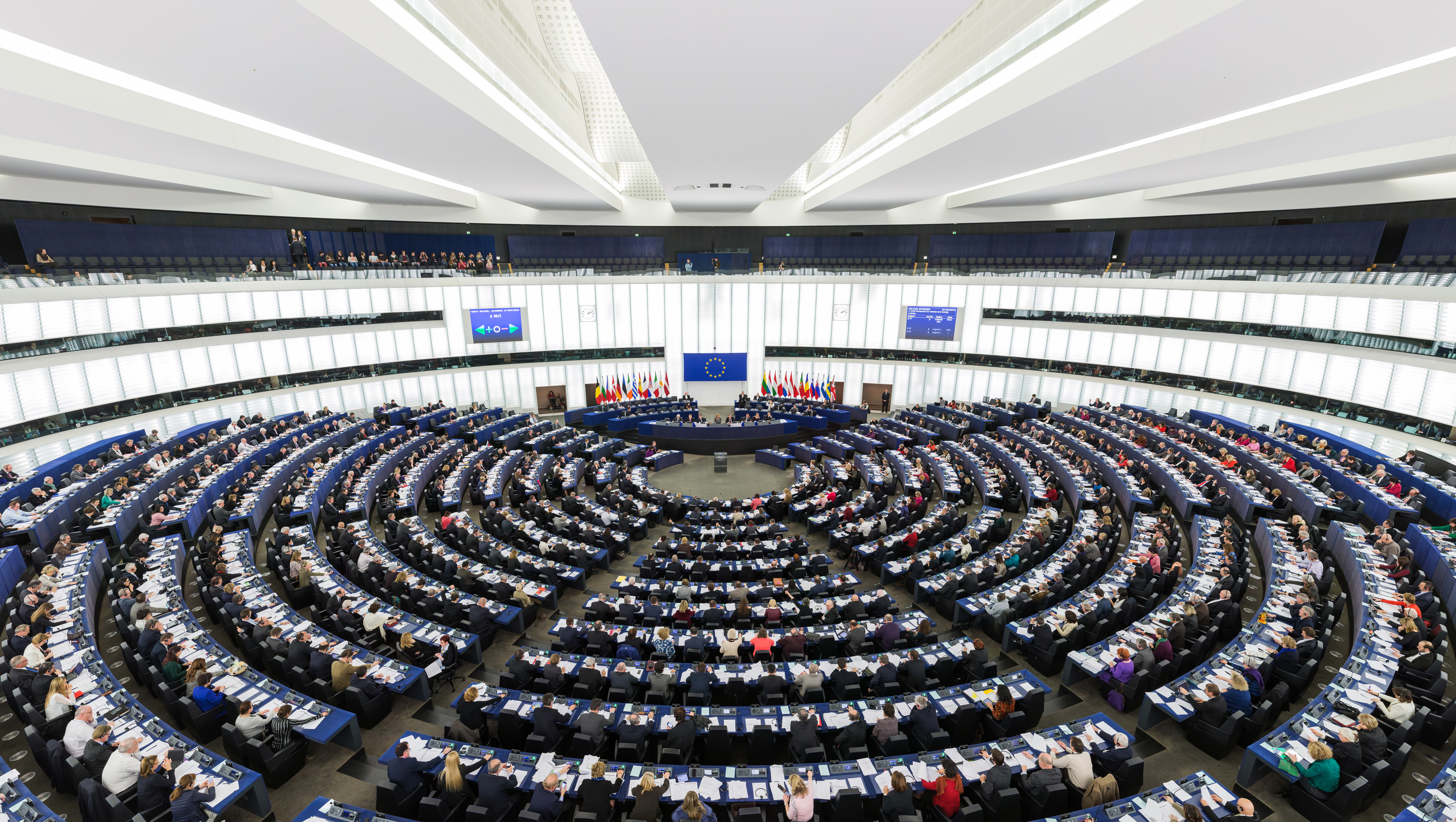
The Strasbourg seat of the European Parliament, which MEPs attend alongside the Brussels seats, has been criticised for its expense. The French President has previously refused to let it be shut down.

To make new legislation, TFEU article 294 defines the "ordinary legislative procedure" that applies for most EU acts. The essence is there are three readings, starting with a Commission proposal, where the Parliament must vote by a majority of all MEPs (not just those present) to block or suggest changes, and the Council must vote by qualified majority to approve changes, but by unanimity to block Commission amendment. Where the different institutions cannot agree at any stage, a "Conciliation Committee" is convened, representing MEPs, ministers and the commission to try to get agreement on a joint text: if this works, it will be sent back to the Parliament and Council to approve by absolute and qualified majority. This means, legislation can be blocked by a majority in Parliament, a minority in the council, and a majority in the commission: it is harder to change EU law than for it to stay the same. A different procedure exists for budgets. For "enhanced cooperation" among a sub-set of at least member states, authorisation must be given by the council. Member state governments should be informed by the Commission at the outset before any proposals start the legislative procedure. The EU as a whole can only act within its power set out in the Treaties. TEU articles 4 and 5 state that powers remain with the member states unless they have been conferred, although there is a debate about the Kompetenz-Kompetenz question: who ultimately has the "competence" to define the EU's "competence". Many member state courts believe they decide, other member state Parliaments believe they decide, while within the EU, the Court of Justice believes it has the final say.

=== Judiciary ===
The judiciary of the EU has played an important role in the development of EU law. It interprets the treaties, and has accelerated economic and political integration. Today the Court of Justice of the European Union (CJEU) is the main judicial body, within which there is a higher Court of Justice that deals with cases that contain more public importance, and a General Court that deals with issues of detail but without general importance, and then a separate Court of Auditors. Under the Treaty on European Union article 19(2) there is one judge from each member state in the Court of Justice and General Court (27 on each at present). Judges should "possess the qualifications required for appointment to the highest judicial offices" (or for the General Court, the "ability required for appointment to high judicial office"). A president is elected by the judges for three years. While TEU article 19(3) says the Court of Justice is the ultimate court to interpret questions of EU law, in practice, most EU law is applied by member state courts (e.g. the German Bundesgerichtshof, the Belgian Cour du travail, and formerly the English Court of Appeal). Member state courts can refer questions to the CJEU for a preliminary ruling. The CJEU's duty is to "ensure that in the interpretation and application of the Treaties the law is observed", although realistically it has the ability to expand and develop the law according to the principles it develops consistently with democratic values. Examples of landmark, and frequently controversial judgments, include Van Gend en Loos (holding EU law to created a new legal order, and citizens could sue for treaty rights), Mangold v Helm (establishing equality as a general principle of EU law), and Kadi v Commission (confirming international law had to conform with basic principles of EU law). Until 2016, there was the European Union Civil Service Tribunal, which dealt with EU institutions' staff issues.

The Court of Justice of the EU in Luxembourg

The Statute of the Court and TFEU require judges are appointed only if they have no political occupation, with independence "beyond doubt". They are selected for renewable six-year terms by "common accord" of governments, with the advice of seven EU or member state judges that the Council and Parliament selects. The Rules of Procedure of the Court of Justice, article 11, says the court is usually organised into chambers of 3 or 5 judges each. A "grand chamber" of 15 more senior judges sit on questions of "difficulty or importance", or those requested by member states. The court's president and vice-president are elected by other judges for renewable 3-year terms by secret ballot. Judges can only be dismissed if all other judges and Advocates General unanimously agree. Advocates General are appointed by the court to give reasoned submissions on cases, especially involving new points of law. Unlike judges on the Court, they write opinions as themselves, rather than collectively, and often with a command of prose and reason, and while not binding are often followed in practice.

In addition, each judge has secretaries or referendaires who research and write. Unlike the UK where judges always write their own opinions, referendaires often assist drafting the judgments in the Court of Justice. The Court's Translation Directorate will translate every final judgment into the 24 official languages of the European Union. The three main kinds of judgments the Court of Justice gives following (1) preliminary rulings, requested by the courts of member states, (2) enforcement actions, brought by the commission or Member States, against the EU, a member state, or any other party that is alleged to violate EU law, and (3) other direct actions, where the EU or member state is involved as a party to the dispute, and gives final rulings. The Rules of Procedure of the Court of Justice, modelled on the International Court of Justice, begin with submission of written cases to the court, followed by a short oral hearing. In each case a judge is designated to actively manage the hearing (called a rapporteur) and draft the judgment (probably with help from referendaires). The court always deliberates and votes before the final opinion is written and published. Cases in the General Court can be appealed to the Court of Justice on points of law. While there is no formal appeal procedure from the Court of Justice, in practice its actions are subject to scrutiny by both the supreme courts of member states and the European Court of Human Rights, even if the final balance of power is unresolved.

=== Conflict of laws ===
Since its founding, the EU has operated among an increasing plurality of member state and globalising legal systems. This has meant both the European Court of Justice and the supreme courts of the states have had to develop principles to resolve conflicts of laws between different systems. Within the EU itself, the Court of Justice's view is that if Union law conflicts with a provision of State law, then Union law has primacy. In the first major case in 1964, Costa v ENEL, a Milanese lawyer, and former shareholder of an energy company, named Mr Costa refused to pay his electricity bill to Enel, as a protest against the Nationalization of the Italian energy corporations. He claimed the Italian nationalisation law conflicted with the Treaty of Rome, (Note: This included TEEC arts 102 (on consulting with the Commission on distortions to the common market), art 93 (on state aids), art 53 (right of establishment), and art 37 (national monopolies of a commercial character should treat all EC nationals equally). See now TFEU.) and requested a reference be made to both the Italian Constitutional Court and the Court of Justice under TFEU article 267. The Italian Constitutional Court gave an opinion that because the nationalisation law was from 1962, and the treaty was in force from 1958, Costa had no claim. By contrast, the Court of Justice held that ultimately the Treaty of Rome in no way prevented energy nationalisation, and in any case under the Treaty provisions only the commission could have brought a claim, not Mr Costa. However, in principle, Mr Costa was entitled to plead that the Treaty conflicted with national law, and the court would have a duty to consider his claim to make a reference if there would be no appeal against its decision. The Court of Justice, repeating its view in Van Gend en Loos, said member states "have limited their sovereign rights, albeit within limited fields, and have thus created a body of law which binds both their nationals and themselves" on the "basis of reciprocity". EU law would not "be overridden by domestic legal provisions, however framed... without the legal basis of the community itself being called into question". This meant any "subsequent unilateral act" of the member state inapplicable. Similarly, in Amministrazione delle Finanze dello Stato v Simmenthal SpA, a company, Simmenthal SpA, claimed that a public health inspection fee under an Italian law of 1970 for importing beef from France to Italy was contrary to two Regulations from 1964 and 1968. In "accordance with the principle of the precedence of Community law", said the Court of Justice, the "directly applicable measures of the institutions" (such as the Regulations in the case) "render automatically inapplicable any conflicting provision of current national law". This was necessary to prevent a "corresponding denial" of Treaty "obligations undertaken unconditionally and irrevocably by member states", that could "imperil the very foundations of the" EU. But despite the views of the Court of Justice, the national courts of member states have not accepted the same analysis.

Generally speaking, while all member states recognise that EU law takes primacy over national law where this agreed in the Treaties, they do not accept that the Court of Justice has the final say on foundational constitutional questions affecting democracy and human rights. The view of the German Constitutional Court from the Solange I and Solange II decisions is that if the EU does not comply with its basic constitutional rights and principles (particularly democracy, the rule of law and the social state principles) then it cannot override German law. However, as the nicknames of the judgments go, "so long as" the EU works towards the democratisation of its institutions, and has a framework that protects fundamental human rights, it would not review EU legislation for compatibility with German constitutional principles. Most other member states have expressed similar reservations. This suggests the EU's legitimacy rests on the ultimate authority of member states, its factual commitment to human rights, and the democratic will of the people.

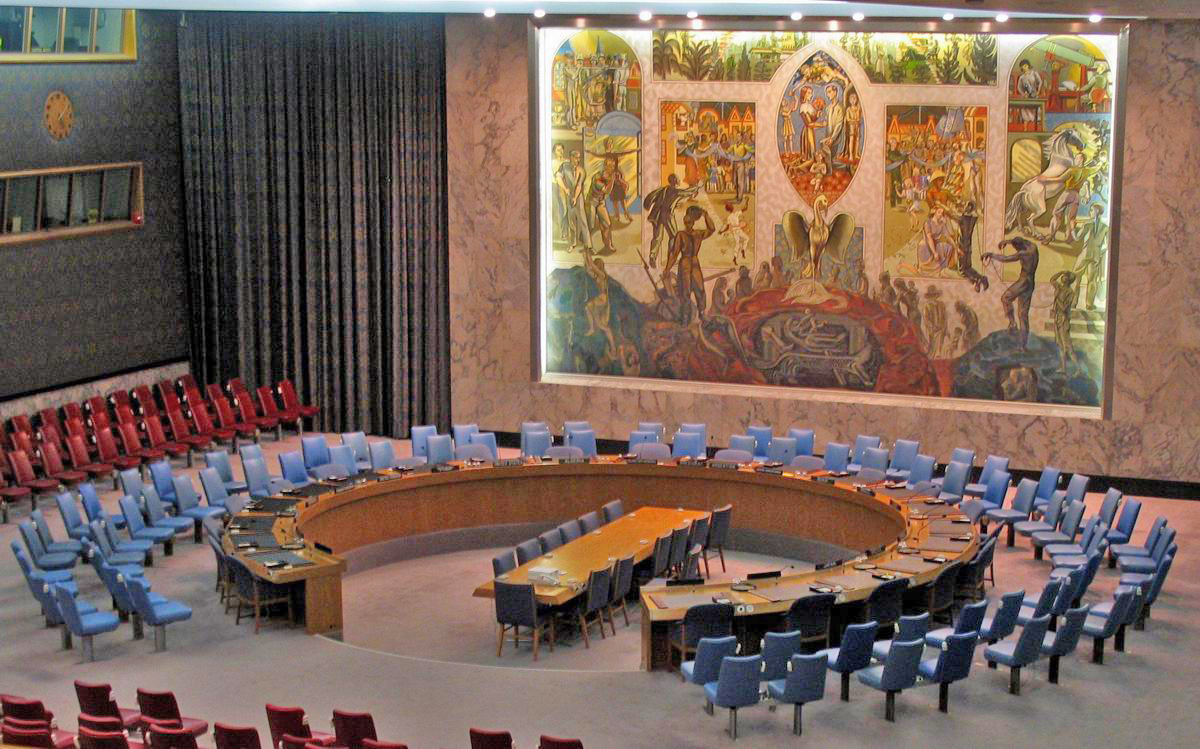
The EU complies with international law and the European Convention on Human Rights, so long as international law institutions, like the United Nations themselves comply with basic human rights.

As opposed to the member states, the relation of EU law and international law is debated, particularly relating to the European Convention on Human Rights and the United Nations. All individual EU member states are party to both organisations through international treaties. The Treaty on European Union article 6(2) required the EU to accede to the ECHR, but would "not affect the Union's competences as defined in the Treaties". This was thought necessary before the Treaty of Lisbon to ensure that the EU gave adequate protection to human rights, overseen by the external European Court of Human Rights in Strasbourg. However, in Opinion 2/13, after a request by the commission to review their plan to accede, the Court of Justice (in Luxembourg) produced five main reasons why it felt that the accession agreement as it stood was incompatible with the treaties. In summary, these were it (1) undermined the CJEU's autonomy (2) allowed for a parallel dispute resolution mechanism among member states, when the treaties said the CJEU should be the sole arbiter (3) the "co-respondent" system, allowing the EU and member states to be sued together, allowed the ECtHR to illegitimately interpret EU law and allocate responsibility between the EU and member states, (4) did not allow the Court of Justice to decide if an issue of law was already dealt with, before the ECHR heard a case, and (5) the ECtHR was illegitimately being given power of judicial review over Common Foreign and Security Policy. The reasoning was regarded by a majority of commentators as thinly veiled attempt of the Court of Justice to clutch onto its own power, but it has meant the commission is redrafting a new accession agreement. Under TEU articles 3(5), 21, 34 and 42, the EU must also respect the principles of the United Nations Charter. After the September 11 attacks on the World Trade Center in New York City, the UN Security Council adopted a resolution to freeze the assets of suspected terrorists, linked to Osama bin Laden. This included a Saudi national, Mr Kadi. Sweden froze his assets pursuant to an EU Regulation, which gave effect to the UN Security Council resolution. In Kadi v Commission, Mr Kadi claimed there was no evidence that he was connected to terrorism, and he had not had a fair trial: a fundamental human right. The opinion of AG Maduro recalled Aharon Barak, of the Supreme Court of Israel, that it "is when the cannons roar that we especially need the laws". The Court of Justice held that even UN member cannot contravene "the principles that form part of the very community legal order". In effect the EU has developed a rule that within the boundaries of certain jus cogens principles, other courts may take primacy. The content of those core principles remains open to ongoing judicial dialogue among the senior courts in the Union.

== Administrative law ==
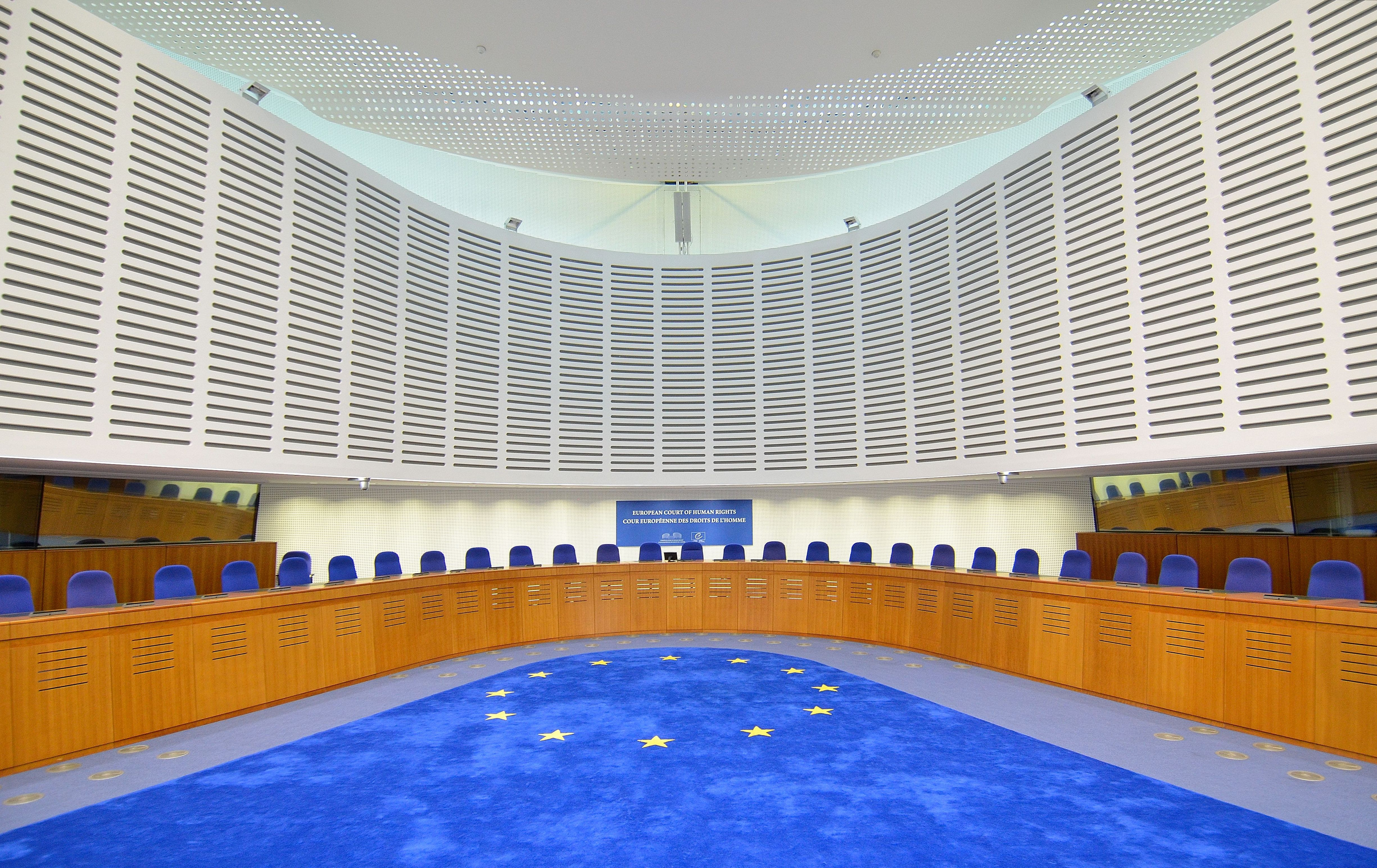
The European Court of Human Rights in Strasbourg, Europe's highest human rights authority, uses the Flag of Europe but is not part of the EU. All EU member states are in the European Convention, and the EU treaties require it to join, but the Court of Justice has delayed.

While constitutional law concerns the European Union's governance structure, administrative law binds EU institutions and member state governments to follow the law. Both member states and the Commission have a general legal right or "standing" (locus standi) to bring claims against EU institutions and other member states for breach of the treaties. From the EU's foundation, the Court of Justice also held that the Treaties allowed citizens or corporations to bring claims against EU and member state institutions for violation of the Treaties and Regulations, if they were properly interpreted as creating rights and obligations. However, under Directives, citizens or corporations were said in 1986 to not be allowed to bring claims against other non-state parties. This meant courts of member states were not bound to apply a Union law where a State law conflicted, even though the member state government could be sued, if it would impose an obligation on another citizen or corporation. These rules on "direct effect" limit the extent to which member state courts are bound to administer EU law. All actions by EU institutions can be subject to judicial review, and judged by standards of proportionality, particularly where general principles of law, or fundamental rights are engaged. The remedy for a claimant where there has been a breach of the law is often monetary damages, but courts can also require specific performance or will grant an injunction, in order to ensure the law is effective as possible.

=== Direct effect ===
Although it is generally accepted that EU law has primacy, not all EU laws give citizens standing to bring claims: that is, not all EU laws have "direct effect". In Van Gend en Loos v Nederlandse Administratie der Belastingen it was held that the provisions of the Treaties (and EU Regulations) are directly effective, if they are (1) clear and unambiguous (2) unconditional, and (3) did not require EU or national authorities to take further action to implement them. Van Gend en Loos, a postal company, claimed that what is now TFEU article 30 prevented the Dutch Customs Authorities charging tariffs, when it imported urea-formaldehyde plastics from Germany to the Netherlands. After a Dutch court made a reference, the Court of Justice held that even though the Treaties did not "expressly" confer a right on citizens or companies to bring claims, they could do so. Historically, international treaties had only allowed states to have legal claims for their enforcement, but the Court of Justice proclaimed "the Community constitutes a new legal order of international law". Because article 30 clearly, unconditionally and immediately stated that no quantitative restrictions could be placed on trade, without a good justification, Van Gend en Loos could recover the money it paid for the tariff. EU Regulations are the same as Treaty provisions in this sense, because as TFEU article 288 states, they are 'directly applicable in all Member States'. Member states come under a duty not to replicate Regulations in their own law, in order to prevent confusion. For instance, in Commission v Italy the Court of Justice held that Italy had breached a duty under the Treaties, both by failing to operate a scheme to pay farmers a premium to slaughter cows (to reduce dairy overproduction), and by reproducing the rules in a decree with various additions. "Regulations", held the Court of Justice, "come into force solely by virtue of their publication" and implementation could have the effect of "jeopardising their simultaneous and uniform application in the whole of the Union". On the other hand, some Regulations may themselves expressly require implementing measures, in which case those specific rules should be followed.

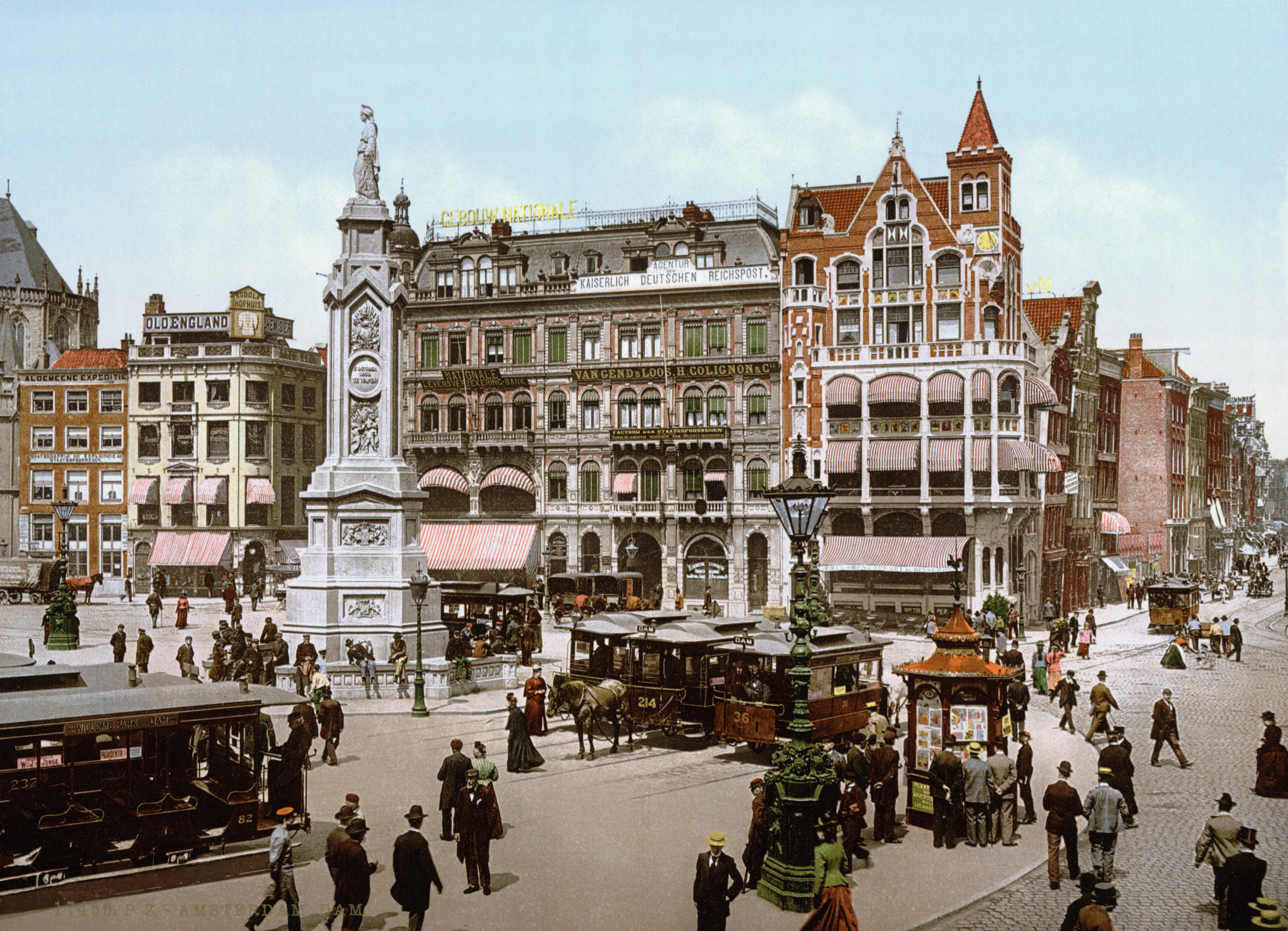
The Van Gend en Loos case first allowed EU citizens to claim rights based on EU law. Despite the influential opinions of three Advocate Generals, and major exceptions, Directives are still thought not to create direct rights among private parties.

While the Treaties and Regulations will have direct effect (if clear, unconditional and immediate), Directives do not generally give citizens (as opposed to the member state) standing to sue other citizens. In theory, this is because TFEU article 288 says Directives are addressed to the member states and usually "leave to the national authorities the choice of form and methods" to implement. In part this reflects that directives often create minimum standards, leaving member states to apply higher standards. For example, the Working Time Directive requires that every worker has at least 4 weeks paid holidays each year, but most member states require more than 28 days in national law. However, on the current position adopted by the Court of Justice, citizens have standing to make claims based on national laws that implement Directives, but not from Directives themselves. Directives do not have so called "horizontal" direct effect (i.e. between non-state parties). This view was instantly controversial, and in the early 1990s three Advocate Generals persuasively argued that Directives should create rights and duties for all citizens. The Court of Justice refused, but there are five large exceptions.

First, if a Directive's deadline for implementation is not met, the member state cannot enforce conflicting laws, and a citizen may rely on the Directive in such an action (so called "vertical" direct effect). So, in Pubblico Ministero v Ratti because the Italian government had failed to implement a Directive 73/173/EEC on packaging and labelling solvents by the deadline, it was estopped from enforcing a conflicting national law from 1963 against Mr Ratti's solvent and varnish business. A member state could "not rely, as against individuals, on its own failure to perform the obligations which the Directive entails". Second, a citizen or company can also invoke a Directive as a defence in a dispute with another citizen or company (not just a public authority) which is attempting to enforce a national law that conflicts with a Directive. So, in CIA Security v Signalson and Securitel the Court of Justice held that a business called CIA Security could defend itself from allegations by competitors that it had not complied with a Belgian decree from 1991 about alarm systems, on the basis that it had not been notified to the commission as a Directive required. Third, if a Directive gives expression to a "general principle" of EU law, it can be invoked between private non-state parties before its deadline for implementation. This follows from Kücükdeveci v Swedex GmbH & Co KG where the German Civil Code §622 stated that the years people worked under the age of 25 would not count towards the increasing statutory notice before dismissal. Ms Kücükdeveci worked for 10 years, from age 18 to 28, for Swedex GmbH & Co KG before her dismissal. She claimed that the law not counting her years under age 25 was unlawful age discrimination under the Employment Equality Framework Directive. The Court of Justice held that the Directive could be relied on by her because equality was also a general principle of EU law. Fourth, if the defendant is an emanation of the state, even if not central government, it can still be bound by Directives. In Foster v British Gas plc the Court of Justice held that Mrs Foster was entitled to bring a sex discrimination claim against her employer, British Gas plc, which made women retire at age 60 and men at 65, if (1) pursuant to a state measure, (2) it provided a public service, and (3) had special powers. This could also be true if the enterprise is privatised, as it was held with a water company that was responsible for basic water provision.

Fifth, national courts have a duty to interpret domestic law "as far as possible in the light of the wording and purpose of the directive". Textbooks (though not the Court itself) often called this "indirect effect". In Marleasing SA v La Comercial SA the Court of Justice held that a Spanish Court had to interpret its general Civil Code provisions, on contracts lacking cause or defrauding creditors, to conform with the First Company Law Directive article 11, that required incorporations would only be nullified for a fixed list of reasons. The Court of Justice quickly acknowledged that the duty of interpretation cannot contradict plain words in a national statute. But, if a member state has failed to implement a Directive, a citizen may not be able to bring claims against other non-state parties. It must instead sue the member state itself for failure to implement the law. In sum, the Court of Justice's position on direct effect means that governments and taxpayers must bear the cost of private parties, mostly corporations, for refusing to follow the law.

=== References and remedies ===
Litigation often begins and is resolved by member state courts. They interpret and apply EU law, and award remedies of compensation and restitution (remedying loss or stripping gains), injunctions and specific performance (making somebody stop or do something). If, however, the position in EU law appears unclear, member state courts can refer questions to the Court of Justice for a "preliminary ruling" on EU law's proper interpretation. TFEU article 267 says court "may" refer "if it considers" this "is necessary to enable it to give judgment", and "shall bring the matter before the Court" if there is no possibility for further appeal and remedy. Any "court or tribunal of a Member State" can refer. This is widely interpreted. It obviously (until Brexit) included bodies like the UK Supreme Court, a High Court, or an Employment Tribunal. In Vaassen v Beambtenfonds Mijnbedrijf the Court of Justice also held that a mining worker pension arbitration tribunal could make a reference. By contrast, and oddly, in Miles v European Schools the Court of Justice held that a Complaints Board of European Schools, set up under the international agreement, the European Schools Convention, could not refer because though it was a court, it was not "of a member state" (even though all member states had signed that Convention).

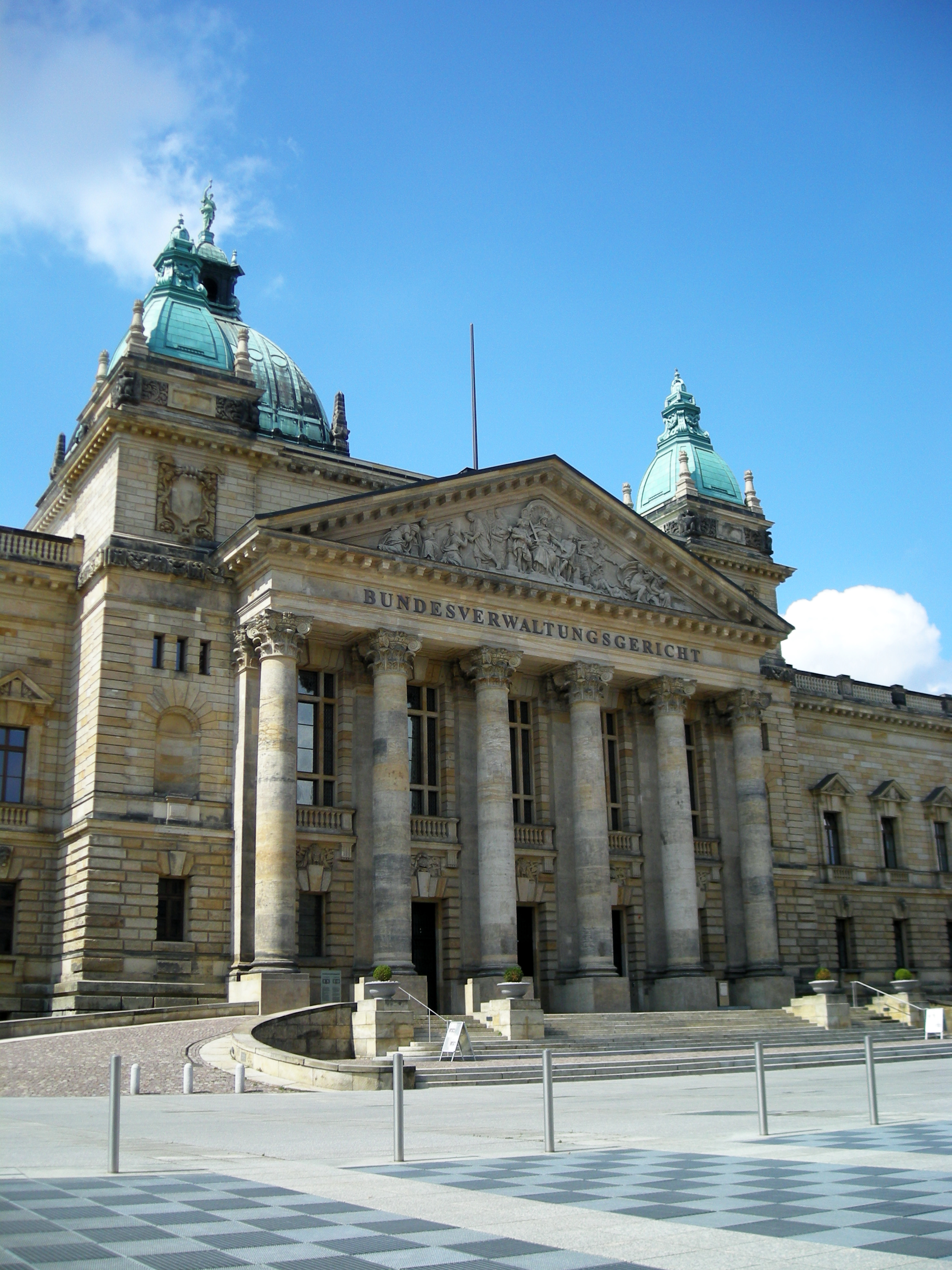
Courts around the EU, like the Federal Administrative Court of Germany, may refer questions of interpretation to the Court of Justice at any time. Some member states are more active than others in doing so.

On the other side, courts and tribunals are theoretically under a duty to refer questions. In the UK, for example, Lord Denning MR considered it appropriate to refer if the outcome of a case depended on a correct answer, and the Civil Procedure Rules entitled the High Court to refer at any stage of proceedings. The view of the Court of Justice in the leading case, CILFIT v Ministry of Health is that a national court has no duty to refer if the law is an acte clair (a clear rule), or "so obvious as to leave no scope for any reasonable doubt as to the manner in which the question raised is to be resolved". In Kenny Roland Lyckeskog the Court of Justice held that the duty to refer existed for the Swedish Court of Appeal, the hovrätt, since Sweden's Supreme Court (Högsta domstol) had to give permission for appeals to continue. The practical difficulty is that judges differ on their views of whether or not the law is clear. In a significant case, Three Rivers DC v Governor of the Bank of England the UK House of Lords felt confident that it was clear under the First Banking Directive that depositors did not have direct rights to sue the Bank of England for alleged failure to carry out adequate prudential regulation. Their Lordships highlighted that while some uncertainty might exist, the costs of delay in making a reference outweighed the benefits from total certainty. By contrast, in ParkingEye Ltd v Beavis, a majority of the Supreme Court apparently felt able to declare that the law under Unfair Terms in Consumer Contracts Directive was acte clair, and decline to make a reference, even though a senior Law Lord delivered a powerfully reasoned dissent. However, in addition to a reluctance to make references, a general scepticism has grown among senior member state judiciaries of the mode of reasoning used by the Court of Justice. The UK Supreme Court in R (HS2 Action Alliance Ltd) v Secretary of State for Transport devoted large parts of its judgment to criticism, in its view, an unpredictable 'teleological' mode of reasoning which, could decrease confidence in maintaining a dialogue within a plural and transnational judicial system. It added that it might not interpret the European Communities Act 1972 to abridge basic principles and understanding of constitutional functioning – in effect implying that it might decline to follow unreasonable Court of Justice judgments on important issues. Similarly, the German Constitutional Court in the Outright Monetary Transactions case referred a question for preliminary ruling on whether the European Central Bank's plan to buy Greek and other government bonds on secondary markets, despite the Treaty prohibition on buying them directly, was unlawful. In a highly unusual move, the two most senior judges dissented that the ECB's plan could be lawful, while the majority closely guided the Court of Justice on the appropriate mode of reasoning.

If references are made, the Court of Justice will give a preliminary ruling, in order for the member state court to conclude the case and award a remedy. The right to an effective remedy is a general principle of EU law, enshrined in the Charter of Fundamental Rights article 47. Most of the time Regulations and Directives will set out the relevant remedies to be awarded, or they will be construed from the legislation according to the practices of the member state. It could also be that the government is responsible for failure to properly implement a Directive or Regulation, and must therefore pay damages. In Francovich v Italy, the Italian government had failed to set up an insurance fund for employees to claim unpaid wages if their employers had gone insolvent, as the Insolvency Protection Directive required. Francovich, the former employee of a bankrupt Venetian firm, was therefore allowed to claim 6 million Lira from the Italian government in damages for his loss. The Court of Justice held that if a Directive would confer identifiable rights on individuals, and there is a causal link between a member state's violation of EU and a claimant's loss, damages must be paid. The fact that the incompatible law is an Act of Parliament is no defence. So, in Factortame it was irrelevant that Parliament had legislated to require a quota of British ownership of fishing vessels in primary legislation. Similarly, in was Brasserie du Pêcheur v Germany the German government was liable to a French beer company for damages from prohibiting its imports, which did not comply with the fabled beer purity law. It was not decisive that the German Parliament had not acted willfully or negligently. It was merely necessary that there was (1) a rule intended to confer rights, (2) that a breach was sufficiently serious, and (3) there was a causal link between the breach and damage. The Court of Justice advised a breach is to be regarded as 'sufficiently serious' by weighing a range of factors, such as whether it was voluntary, or persistent. In Köbler v Republik Österreich the Court of Justice added that member state liability could also flow from judges failing to adequately implement the law. On the other hand, it is also clear that EU institutions, such as the commission, may be liable according to the same principles for failure to follow the law. The only institution whose decisions appear incapable of generating a damages claim is the Court of Justice itself.

=== Judicial review ===
As well as preliminary rulings on the proper interpretation of EU law, an essential function of the Court of Justice is judicial review of the acts of the EU itself. Under Treaty on the Functioning of the European Union (TFEU) article 263(1) the Court can review the legality of any EU legislative of other "act" against the Treaties or general principles, such as those in the Charter of Fundamental Rights of the European Union. This includes legislation, and most other acts that have legal consequences for people. For example, in Société anonyme Cimenteries CBR Cementsbedrijven NV v Commission the commission made a decision to withdraw an assurance to a Dutch cement company that it would be immune from competition law fines, for vertical agreements. The cement company challenged the decision, and the Commission argued this was not really an "act", and so could not be challenged. The Court of Justice held a challenge could be made, and it was an act, because it "deprived [the cement company] of the advantages of a legal situation... and exposed them to a grave financial risk". Similarly in Deutsche Post v Commission the Commission demanded information on state aid given by Germany to Deutsche Post within 20 days. When both challenged this, the Commission argued that the demand for information could not be an act as there was no sanction. The Court of Justice disagreed, and held judicial review could proceed because the request produced "binding legal effects" since the information supplied or not could be relied upon as evidence in a final decision. By contrast, in IBM v Commission the Court of Justice held that a letter from the commission to IBM that it would sue IBM for abusing a dominant position contrary to competition was not a reviewable act, but just a preliminary statement of intent to act. In any case, if a reviewable act of an EU institution is not found compatible with the law, under article 264, it will be declared void.

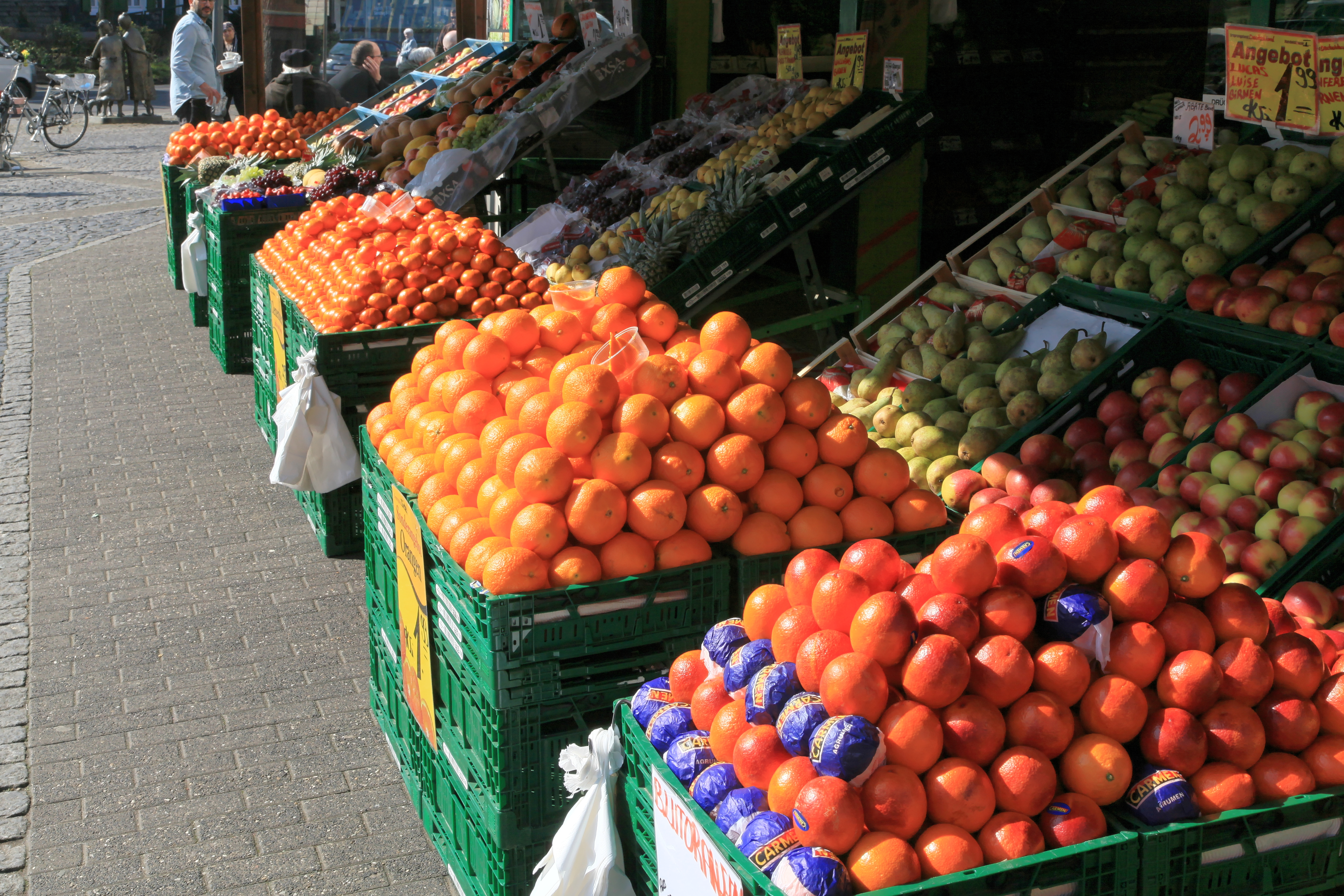
Plaumann & Co v Commission required that claimants must be individually and directly concerned by an EU law to request judicial review. Being adversely affected by rising clementine duties was not enough.

However, only a limited number of people can bring claims for judicial review. Under TFEU article 263(2), a member state, the Parliament, Council or Commission have automatic rights to seek judicial review. But under article 263(4) a "natural or legal person" must have a "direct and individual concern" about the regulatory act. "Direct" concern means that someone is affected by an EU act without "the interposition of an autonomous will between the decision and its effect", for instance by a national government body. In Piraiki-Patraiki v Commission, a group of Greek textile businesses, who exported cotton products to France, challenged a Commission decision allow France to limit exports. The Commission argued that the exporters were not directly concerned, because France might decide not to limit exports, but the Court of Justice held this possibility was "entirely theoretical". A challenge could be brought. By contrast in Municipality of Differdange v Commission a municipality wanted to challenge the Commissions decision to aid steel firms which reduced production: this would probably reduce its tax collections. But the Court of Justice held that because Luxembourg had discretion, and its decision to reduce capacity was not inevitable, the municipality had no "direct" concern (its complaint was with the Luxembourg government instead). "Individual" concern requires that someone is affected specifically, not as a member of a group. In Plaumann & Co v Commission the Court of Justice held that a clementine importer was not individually concerned when the Commission refused permission to Germany to stop import custom duties. This kept it more expensive for Mr Plaumann to import clementines, but it was equally expensive for everyone else. This decision heavily restricted the number of people who could claim for judicial review. In Unión de Pequeños Agricultores, Advocate General Jacobs propose a broader test of allowing anyone to claim if there was a "substantial adverse effect" on the claimant's interests. Here, a group of Spanish olive oil producers challenged Council Regulation No 1638/98, which withdrew subsidies. Because Regulations are not implemented in national law, but have direct effect, they argued the requirement for individual concern would deny them effective judicial protection. The Court of Justice held that direct actions were still not allowed: if this was unsatisfactory the member states would have to change the treaties. Individual concern is not needed, however under article 263(4), if an act is not legislation, but just a "regulatory act". In Inuit Tapiriit Kanatami v Parliament and Council the Court of Justice affirmed that a Regulation does not count as a "regulatory act" within the Treaty's meaning: it is only meant for acts of lesser importance. Here, a Canadian group representing the Inuit wished to challenge a Regulation on seal products, but were not allowed. They would have to show both direct and individual concern as normal. Thus, without a treaty change, EU administrative law remains one of the most restrictive in Europe.

=== Human rights and principles ===
Although access to judicial review is restricted for ordinary questions of law, the Court of Justice has gradually developed a more open approach to standing for human rights. Human rights have also become essential in the proper interpretation and construction of all EU law. If there are two or more plausible interpretations of a rule, the one which is most consistent with human rights should be chosen. The Treaty of Lisbon 2007 made rights underpin the Court of Justice's competence, and required the EU's accession to the European Convention on Human Rights, overseen by the external Strasbourg Court. Initially, reflecting its primitive economic nature, the treaties made no reference to rights. However, in 1969 particularly after concern from Germany, the Court of Justice declared in Stauder v City of Ulm that 'fundamental human rights' were 'enshrined in the general principles of Community law'. This meant that Mr Stauder, who received subsidised butter under an EU welfare scheme only by showing a coupon with his name and address, was entitled to claim that this violated his dignity: he was entitled not to have to go through the humiliation of proving his identity to get food. While those 'general principles' were not written down in EU law, and simply declared to exist by the court, it accords with a majority philosophical view that 'black letter' rules, or positive law, necessarily exist for reasons that the society which made them wants: these give rise to principles, which inform the law's purpose. Moreover, the Court of Justice has clarified that its recognition of rights was 'inspired' by member states' own 'constitutional traditions', and international treaties. These include rights found in member state constitutions, bills of rights, foundational Acts of Parliament, landmark court cases, the European Convention on Human Rights, the European Social Charter 1961, the Universal Declaration of Human Rights 1948, or the International Labour Organization's Conventions. The EU itself must accede to the ECHR, although in Opinion 2/13 the Court of Justice delayed, because of perceived difficulties in retaining an appropriate balance of competences.

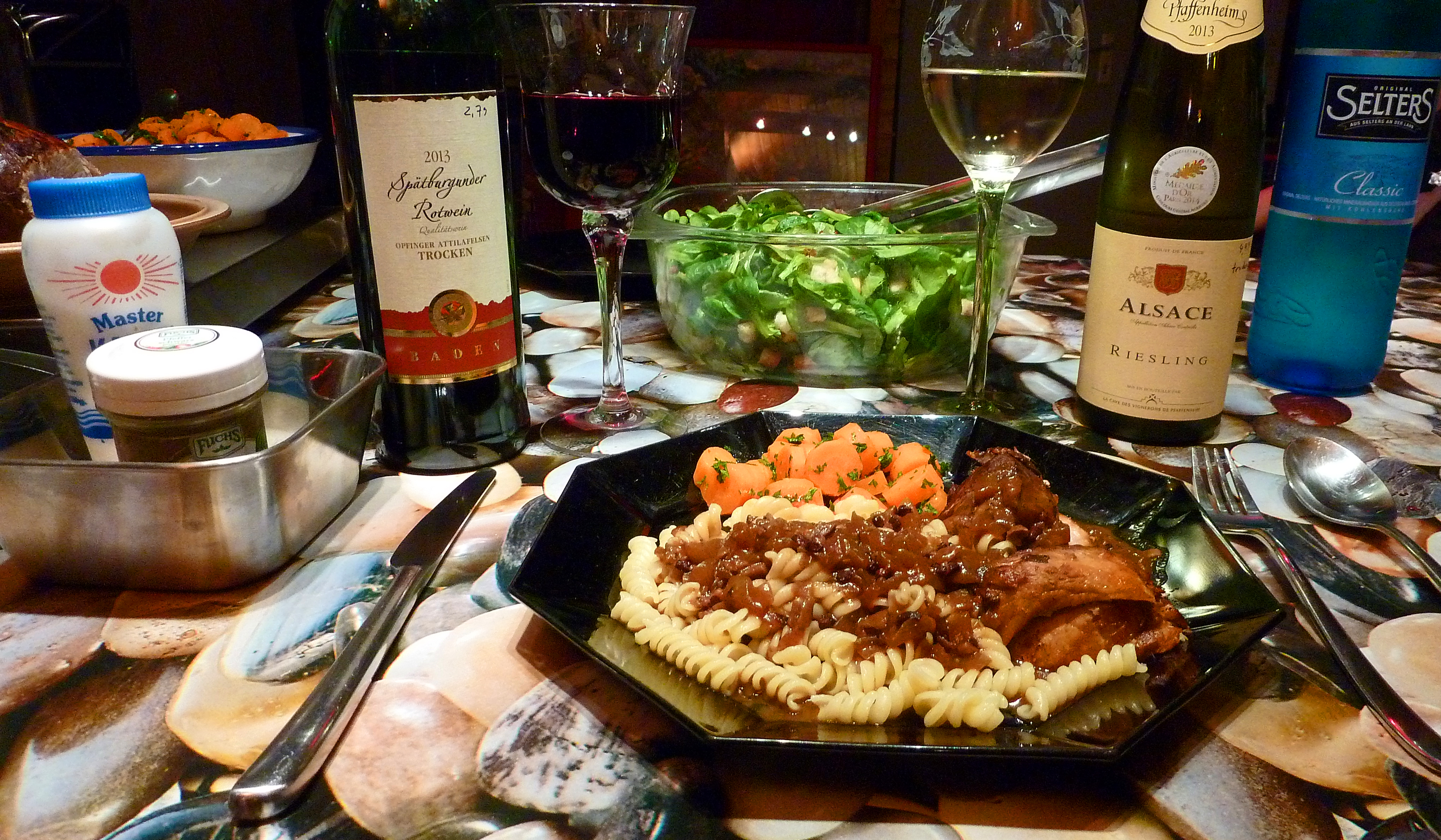
In Deutsches Weintor eG, wine growers wanted to market their wine as "easily digestible", but the food regulators thought this would mislead consumers. The Court of Justice applied the right to health in the Charter, in support of good consumer information.

Many of the most important rights were codified in the Charter of Fundamental Rights of the European Union in 2000. While the UK has opted out of direct application of the Charter, this has little practical relevance since the Charter merely reflected pre-existing principles and the Court of Justice uses the Charter to interpret all EU law. For example, in Test-Achats ASBL v Conseil des ministres, the Court of Justice held that Equal Treatment in Goods and Services Directive 2004 article 5(2), which purported to allow a derogation from equal treatment, so that men and women could be charged different car insurance rates, was unlawful. It contravened the principle of equality in CFREU 2000 articles 21 and 23, and had to be regarded as ineffective after a transition period. By contrast, in Deutsches Weintor eG v Land Rheinland-Pfalz wine producers claimed that a direction to stop marketing their brands as 'easily digestible' (bekömmlich) by the state food regulator (acting under EU law) contravened their right to occupational and business freedom under CFREU 2000 articles 15 and 16. The Court of Justice held that in fact, the right to health for consumers in article 35 has also to be taken into account, and was to be given greater weight, particularly given the health effects of alcohol. Some rights in the Charter, however, are not expressed with sufficient clarity to be regarded as directly binding. In AMS v Union locale des syndicats CGT a French trade union claimed that the French Labour Code should not exclude casual workers from counting toward the right to set up a work council that an employing entity must inform and consult. They said this contravened the Information and Consultation of Employees Directive and also CFREU article 27. The Court of Justice agreed that the French Labour Code was incompatible with the Directive, but held that article 27 was expressed too generally to create direct rights. On this view, legislation was necessary to make abstract human rights principles concrete, and legally enforceable.

Beyond human rights, the Court of Justice has recognised at least five further 'general principles' of EU law. The categories of general principles are not closed, and may develop according to the social expectations of people living in Europe.

1. Legal certainty requires that judgments should be prospective, open and clear.
2. Decision-making must be "proportionate" toward a legitimate aim when reviewing any discretionary act of a government or powerful body, for example, if a government wishes to change an employment law in a neutral way, yet this could have disproportionate negative impact on women rather than men, the government must show a legitimate aim, and that its measures are (1) appropriate or suitable for achieving it, (2) do no more than necessary, and (3) reasonable in balancing the conflicting rights of different parties.
3. Equality is regarded as a fundamental principle: this matters particularly for labour rights, political rights, and access to public or private services.
4. Right to a fair hearing.
5. Professional privilege between lawyers and clients.

== Free movement and trade ==
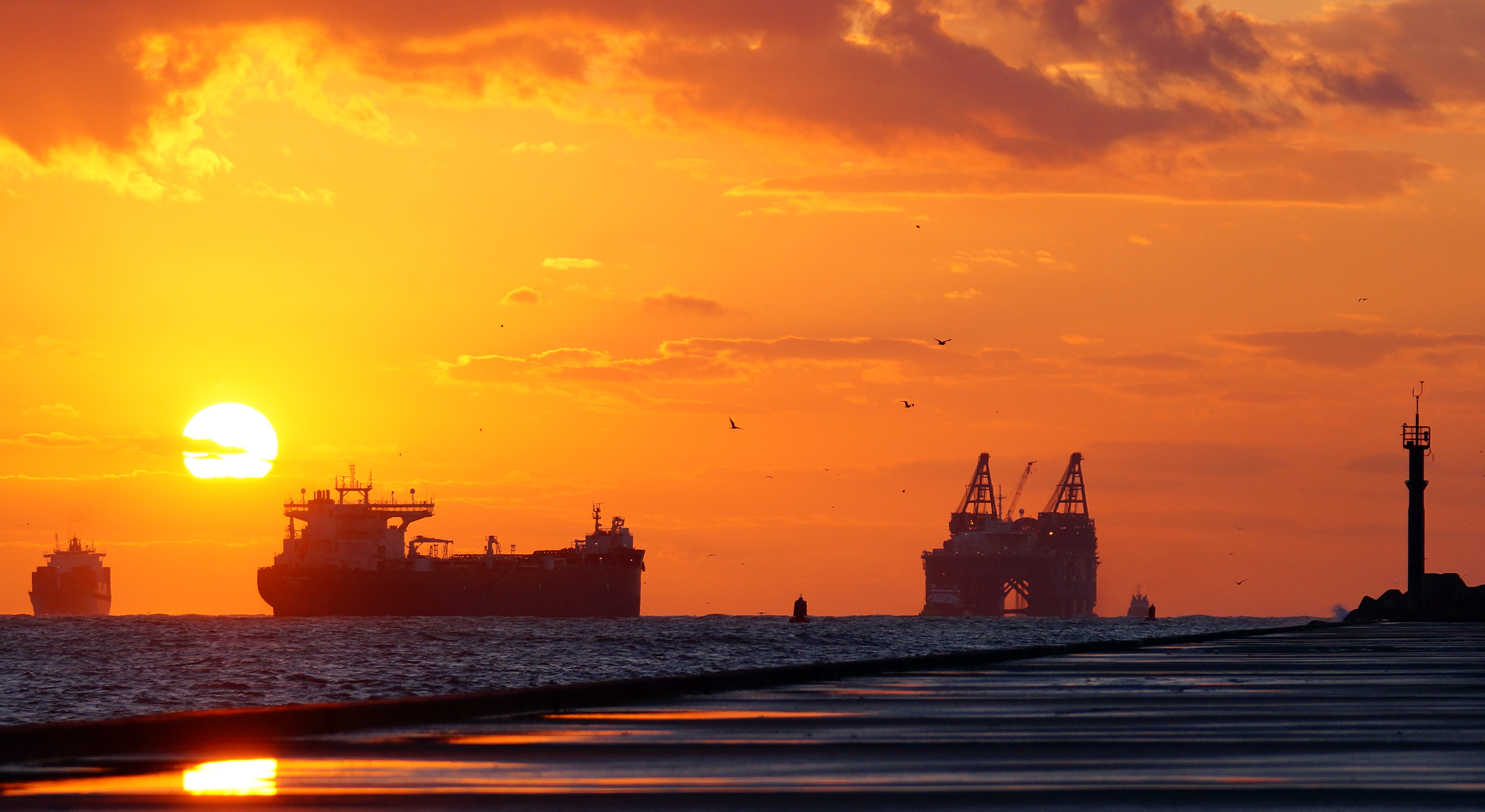
The EU's internal market for trade exports, like those passing through its largest Port of Rotterdam, totals over €2840 billion.

While the "social market economy" concept was only put into EU law by the 2007 Treaty of Lisbon, free movement and trade were central to European development since the Treaty of Rome in 1957. The standard theory of comparative advantage says two countries can both benefit from trade even if one of them has a less productive economy in all respects. Like the North American Free Trade Association, or the World Trade Organization, EU law breaks down barriers to trade, by creating rights to free movement of goods, services, labour and capital. This is meant to reduce consumer prices and raise living standards. Early theorists argued a free trade area would give way to a customs union, which led to a common market, then monetary union, then union of monetary and fiscal policy, and eventually a full union characteristic of a federal state. But in Europe those stages were mixed, and it is unclear whether the "endgame" should be the same as a state. Free trade, without rights to ensure fair trade, can benefit some groups within countries (particularly big business) more than others, and disadvantages people who lack bargaining power in an expanding market, particularly workers, consumers, small business, developing industries, and communities. For this reason, the European has become "not merely an economic union", but creates binding social rights for people to "ensure social progress and seek the constant improvement of the living and working conditions of their peoples". The Treaty on the Functioning of the European Union articles 28 to 37 establish the principle of free movement of goods in the EU, while articles 45 to 66 require free movement of persons, services and capital. These "four freedoms" were thought to be inhibited by physical barriers (e.g. customs), technical barriers (e.g. differing laws on safety, consumer or environmental standards) and fiscal barriers (e.g. different Value Added Tax rates). Free movement and trade is not meant to be a licence for unrestricted commercial profit. Increasingly, the Treaties and the Court of Justice aim to ensure free trade serves higher values such as public health, consumer protection, labour rights, fair competition, and environmental improvement.

=== Goods ===
Free movement of goods within the European Union is achieved by a customs union, and the principle of non-discrimination. The EU manages imports from non-member states, duties between member states are prohibited, and imports circulate freely. In addition under the Treaty on the Functioning of the European Union article 34, 'Quantitative restrictions on imports and all measures having equivalent effect shall be prohibited between Member States'. In Procureur du Roi v Dassonville the Court of Justice held that this rule meant all "trading rules" that are "enacted by Member States" which could hinder trade "directly or indirectly, actually or potentially" would be caught by article 34. This meant that a Belgian law requiring Scotch whisky imports to have a certificate of origin was unlikely to be lawful. It discriminated against parallel importers like Mr Dassonville, who could not get certificates from authorities in France, where they bought the Scotch. This "wide test", to determine what could potentially be an unlawful restriction on trade, applies equally to actions by quasi-government bodies, such as the former "Buy Irish" company that had government appointees. It also means states can be responsible for private actors. For instance, in Commission v France French farmer vigilantes were continually sabotaging shipments of Spanish strawberries, and even Belgian tomato imports. France was liable for these hindrances to trade because the authorities 'manifestly and persistently abstained' from preventing the sabotage.

Generally speaking, if a member state has laws or practices that directly discriminate against imports (or exports under TFEU article 35) then it must be justified under article 36. The justifications include public morality, policy or security, "protection of health and life of humans, animals or plants", "national treasures" of "artistic, historic or archaeological value" and "industrial and commercial property". In addition, although not clearly listed, environmental protection can justify restrictions on trade as an overriding requirement derived from TFEU article 11. More generally, it has been increasingly acknowledged that fundamental human rights should take priority over all trade rules. So, in Schmidberger v Austria the Court of Justice held that Austria did not infringe article 34 by failing to ban a protest that blocked heavy traffic passing over the A13, Brenner Autobahn, en route to Italy. Although many companies, including Mr Schmidberger's German undertaking, were prevented from trading, the Court of Justice reasoned that freedom of association is one of the 'fundamental pillars of a democratic society', against which the free movement of goods had to be balanced, and was probably subordinate. If a member state does appeal to the article 36 justification, the measures it takes have to be applied proportionately. This means the rule must be pursue a legitimate aim and (1) be suitable to achieve the aim, (2) be necessary, so that a less restrictive measure could not achieve the same result, and (3) be reasonable in balancing the interests of free trade with interests in article 36.

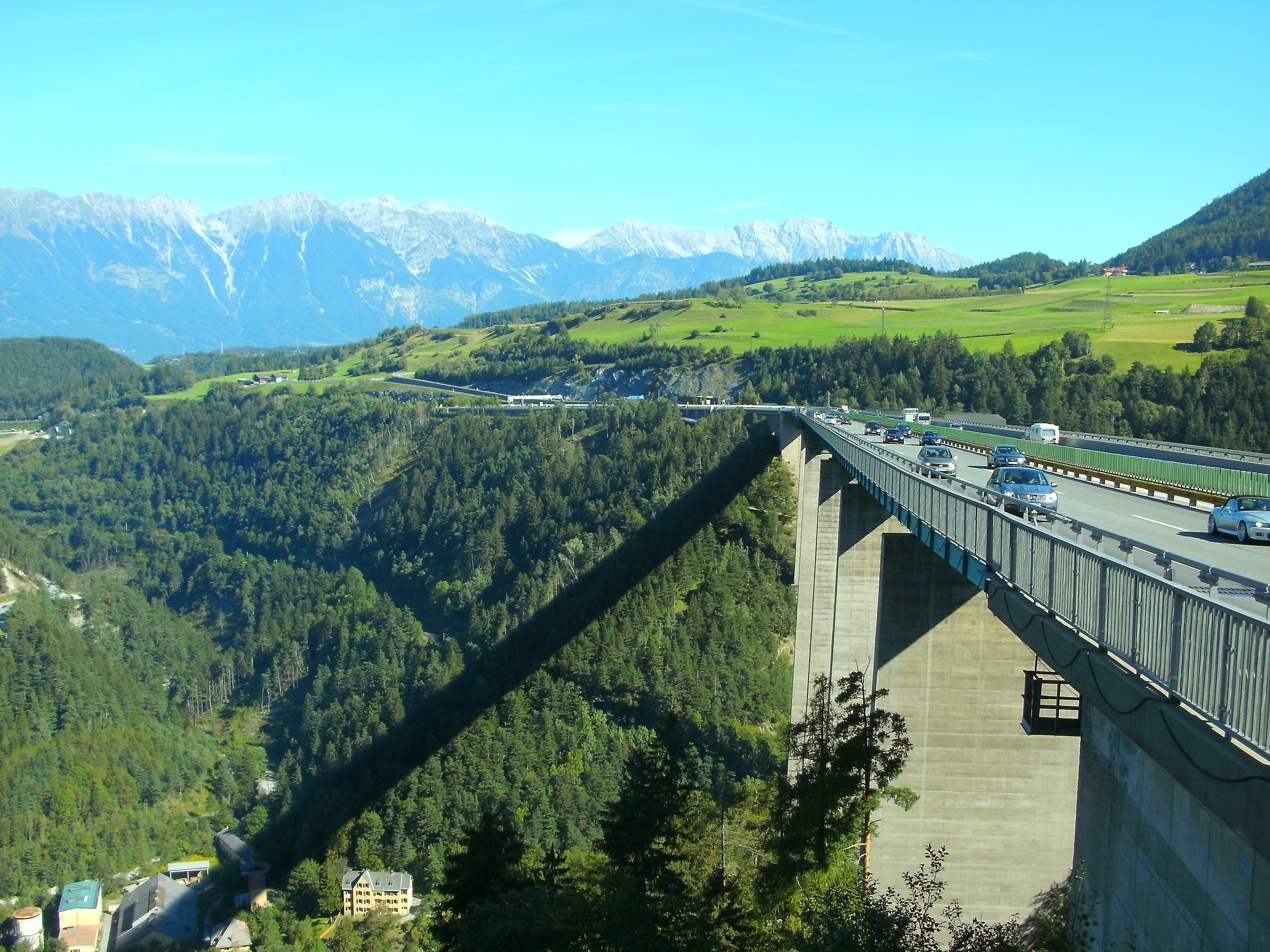
In Schmidberger v Austria, protests blocked trucks for goods through the Austrian Alps on the Brenner Autobahn. The Court of Justice recognised fundamental rights take priority over free trade.

Often rules apply to all goods neutrally, but may have a greater practical effect on imports than domestic products. For such "indirect" discriminatory (or "indistinctly applicable") measures the Court of Justice has developed more justifications: either those in article 36, or additional "mandatory" or "overriding" requirements such as consumer protection, improving labour standards, protecting the environment, press diversity, fairness in commerce, and more: the categories are not closed. In the noted case Rewe-Zentral AG v Bundesmonopol für Branntwein, the Court of Justice found that a German law requiring all spirits and liqueurs (not just imported ones) to have a minimum alcohol content of 25 per cent was contrary to TFEU article 34, because it had a greater negative effect on imports. German liqueurs were over 25 per cent alcohol, but Cassis de Dijon, which Rewe-Zentrale AG wished to import from France, only had 15 to 20 per cent alcohol. The Court of Justice rejected the German government's arguments that the measure proportionately protected public health under TFEU article 36, because stronger beverages were available and adequate labelling would be enough for consumers to understand what they bought. This rule primarily applies to requirements about a product's content or packaging. In Walter Rau Lebensmittelwerke v De Smedt PVBA the Court of Justice found that a Belgian law requiring all margarine to be in cube shaped packages infringed article 34, and was not justified by the pursuit of consumer protection. The argument that Belgians would believe it was butter if it was not cube shaped was disproportionate: it would "considerably exceed the requirements of the object in view" and labelling would protect consumers "just as effectively".

In a 2003 case, Commission v Italy Italian law required that cocoa products that included other vegetable fats could not be labelled as "chocolate". It had to be "chocolate substitute". All Italian chocolate was made from cocoa butter alone, but British, Danish and Irish manufacturers used other vegetable fats. They claimed the law infringed article 34. The Court of Justice held that a low content of vegetable fat did not justify a "chocolate substitute" label. This was derogatory in the consumers' eyes. A 'neutral and objective statement' was enough to protect consumers. If member states place considerable obstacles on the use of a product, this can also infringe article 34. So, in a 2009 case, Commission v Italy, the Court of Justice held that an Italian law prohibiting motorcycles or mopeds pulling trailers infringed article 34. Again, the law applied neutrally to everyone, but disproportionately affected importers, because Italian companies did not make trailers. This was not a product requirement, but the Court reasoned that the prohibition would deter people from buying it: it would have "a considerable influence on the behaviour of consumers" that "affects the access of that product to the market". It would require justification under article 36, or as a mandatory requirement.

In 2002, Rem Koolhaas' proposed "barcode" Flag of Europe, caused uproar as it symbolised the EU becoming no more than a market economy for endless competitive consumption, devoid of social values and rights. It was not adopted.

In contrast to product requirements or other laws that hinder market access, the Court of Justice developed a presumption that "selling arrangements" would be presumed to not fall into TFEU article 34, if they applied equally to all sellers, and affected them in the same manner in fact. In Keck and Mithouard two importers claimed that their prosecution under a French competition law, which prevented them selling Picon beer under wholesale price, was unlawful. The aim of the law was to prevent cut throat competition, not to hinder trade. The Court of Justice held, as "in law and in fact" it was an equally applicable "selling arrangement" (not something that alters a product's content) it was outside the scope of article 34, and so did not need to be justified. Selling arrangements can be held to have an unequal effect "in fact" particularly where traders from another member state are seeking to break into the market, but there are restrictions on advertising and marketing. In Konsumentombudsmannen v De Agostini the Court of Justice reviewed Swedish bans on advertising to children under age 12, and misleading commercials for skin care products. While the bans have remained (justifiable under article 36 or as a mandatory requirement) the Court emphasised that complete marketing bans could be disproportionate if advertising were "the only effective form of promotion enabling [a trader] to penetrate" the market. In Konsumentombudsmannen v Gourmet AB the Court suggested that a total ban for advertising alcohol on the radio, TV and in magazines could fall within article 34 where advertising was the only way for sellers to overcome consumers' "traditional social practices and to local habits and customs" to buy their products, but again the national courts would decide whether it was justified under article 36 to protect public health. Under the Unfair Commercial Practices Directive, the EU harmonised restrictions on restrictions on marketing and advertising, to forbid conduct that distorts average consumer behaviour, is misleading or aggressive, and sets out a list of examples that count as unfair. Increasingly, states have to give mutual recognition to each other's standards of regulation, while the EU has attempted to harmonise minimum ideals of best practice. The attempt to raise standards is hoped to avoid a regulatory "race to the bottom", while allowing consumers access to goods from around the continent.

=== Workers ===
Since its foundation, the Treaties sought to enable people to pursue their life goals in any country through free movement. Reflecting the economic nature of the project, the European Community originally focused upon free movement of workers: as a "factor of production". However, from the 1970s, this focus shifted towards developing a more "social" Europe. Free movement was increasingly based on "citizenship", so that people had rights to empower them to become economically and socially active, rather than economic activity being a precondition for rights. This means the basic "worker" rights in TFEU article 45 function as a specific expression of the general rights of citizens in TFEU articles 18 to 21. According to the Court of Justice, a "worker" is anybody who is economically active, which includes everyone in an employment relationship, "under the direction of another person" for "remuneration". A job, however, need not be paid in money for someone to be protected as a worker. For example, in Steymann v Staatssecretaris van Justitie, a German man claimed the right to residence in the Netherlands, while he volunteered plumbing and household duties in the Bhagwan community, which provided for everyone's material needs irrespective of their contributions. The Court of Justice held that Mr Steymann was entitled to stay, so long as there was at least an "indirect quid pro quo" for the work he did. Having "worker" status means protection against all forms of discrimination by governments, and employers, in access to employment, tax, and social security rights. By contrast a citizen, who is "any person having the nationality of a Member State" (TFEU article 20(1)), has rights to seek work, vote in local and European elections, but more restricted rights to claim social security. In practice, free movement has become politically contentious as nationalist political parties have manipulated fears about immigrants taking away people's jobs and benefits (paradoxically at the same time). Nevertheless, practically "all available research finds little impact" of "labour mobility on wages and employment of local workers".

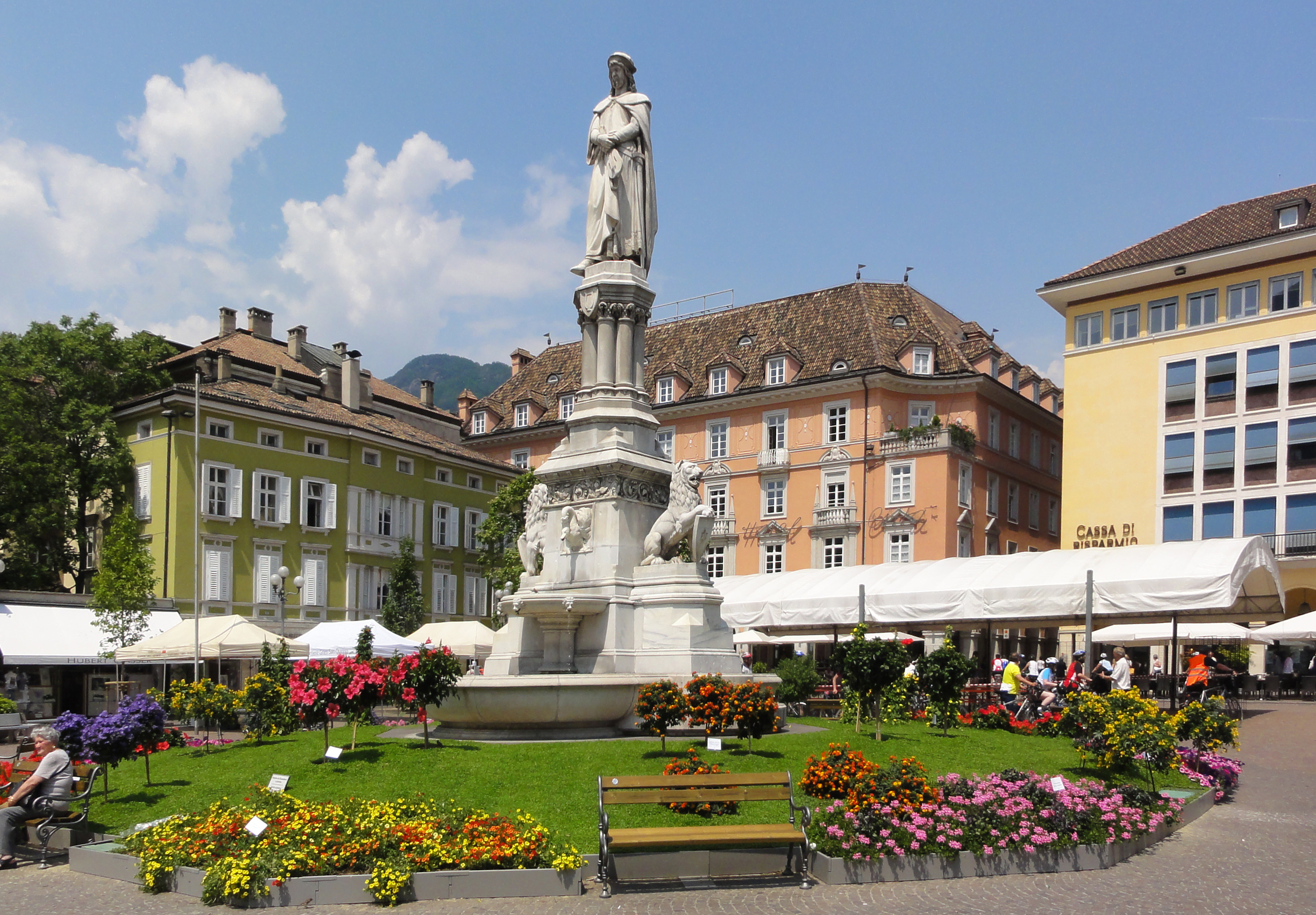
In Angonese the Court of Justice gave "horizontal direct effect" to free movement, so a bank could not refuse employment to a worker who lacked a Bolzano language certificate.

The Free Movement of Workers Regulation articles 1 to 7 set out the main provisions on equal treatment of workers. First, articles 1 to 4 generally require that workers can take up employment, conclude contracts, and not suffer discrimination compared to nationals of the member state. In a famous case, the Belgian Football Association v Bosman, a Belgian footballer named Jean-Marc Bosman claimed that he should be able to transfer from R.F.C. de Liège to USL Dunkerque when his contract finished, regardless of whether Dunkerque could afford to pay Liège the habitual transfer fees. The Court of Justice held "the transfer rules constitute[d] an obstacle to free movement" and were unlawful unless they could be justified in the public interest, but this was unlikely. In Groener v Minister for Education the Court of Justice accepted that a requirement to speak Gaelic to teach in a Dublin design college could be justified as part of the public policy of promoting the Irish language, but only if the measure was not disproportionate. By contrast in Angonese v Cassa di Risparmio di Bolzano SpA a bank in Bolzano, Italy, was not allowed to require Mr Angonese to have a bilingual certificate that could only be obtained in Bolzano. The Court of Justice, giving "horizontal" direct effect to TFEU article 45, reasoned that people from other countries would have little chance of acquiring the certificate, and because it was "impossible to submit proof of the required linguistic knowledge by any other means", the measure was disproportionate. Second, article 7(2) requires equal treatment in respect of tax. In Finanzamt Köln Altstadt v Schumacker the Court of Justice held that it contravened TFEU art 45 to deny tax benefits (e.g. for married couples, and social insurance expense deductions) to a man who worked in Germany, but was resident in Belgium when other German residents got the benefits. By contrast in Weigel v Finanzlandesdirektion für Vorarlberg the Court of Justice rejected Mr Weigel's claim that a re-registration charge upon bringing his car to Austria violated his right to free movement. Although the tax was "likely to have a negative bearing on the decision of migrant workers to exercise their right to freedom of movement", because the charge applied equally to Austrians, in absence of EU legislation on the matter it had to be regarded as justified. Third, people must receive equal treatment regarding "social advantages", although the Court has approved residential qualifying periods. In Hendrix v Employee Insurance Institute the Court of Justice held that a Dutch national was not entitled to continue receiving incapacity benefits when he moved to Belgium, because the benefit was "closely linked to the socio-economic situation" of the Netherlands. Conversely, in Geven v Land Nordrhein-Westfalen the Court of Justice held that a Dutch woman living in the Netherlands, but working between 3 and 14 hours a week in Germany, did not have a right to receive German child benefits, even though the wife of a man who worked full-time in Germany but was resident in Austria could. The general justifications for limiting free movement in TFEU article 45(3) are "public policy, public security or public health", and there is also a general exception in article 45(4) for "employment in the public service".

=== Citizens ===
Beyond the right of free movement to work, the EU has increasingly sought to guarantee rights of citizens, and rights simply be being a human being. But although the Court of Justice stated that 'Citizenship is destined to be the fundamental status of nationals of the Member States', political debate remains on who should have access to public services and welfare systems funded by taxation. As of now, Union citizenship is criticised for being not inclusive enough and having failed to establish a truly borderless space of social solidarity. In 2008, just 8 million people from 500 million EU citizens (1.7 per cent) had in fact exercised rights of free movement, the vast majority workers. According to TFEU article 20, citizenship of the EU derives from nationality of a member state. Article 21 confers general rights to free movement in the EU and to reside freely within limits set by legislation. This applies for citizens and their immediate family members. This triggers four main groups of rights: (1) to enter, depart and return, without undue restrictions, (2) to reside, without becoming an unreasonable burden on social assistance, (3) to vote in local and European elections, and (4) the right to equal treatment with nationals of the host state, but for social assistance only after 3 months of residence.

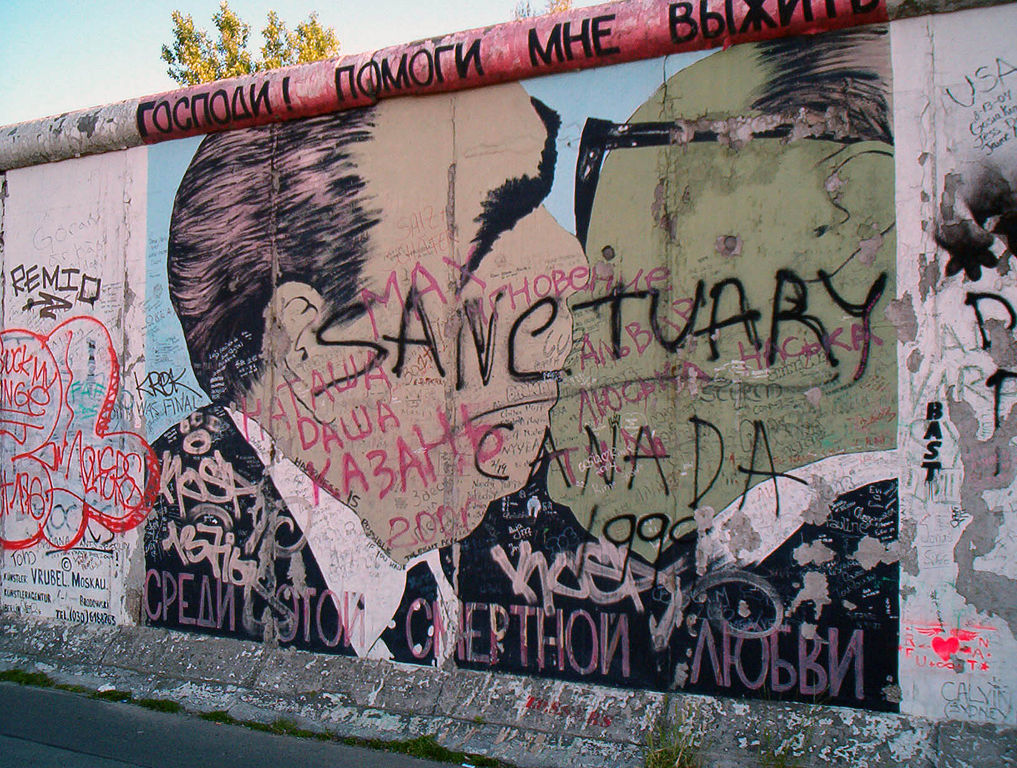
The Berlin Wall (1961–1989) symbolised a bordered globe, where citizens of the Soviet Union had no right to leave, and few could enter. The EU has progressively dismantled barriers to free movement, consistent with economic development.

First, the Citizens Rights Directive 2004 article 4 says every citizen has the right to depart a member state with a valid passport. This has historical importance for central and eastern Europe, when the Soviet Union and the Berlin Wall denied its citizens the freedom to leave. Article 5 gives every citizen a right of entry, subject to national border controls. Schengen Area countries (not the UK and Ireland) abolished the need to show documents, and police searches at borders, altogether. These reflect the general principle of free movement in TFEU article 21. Second, article 6 allows every citizen to stay three months in another member state, whether economically active or not. Article 7 allows stays over three months with evidence of "sufficient resources... not to become a burden on the social assistance system". Articles 16 and 17 give a right to permanent residence after 5 years without conditions. Third, TEU article 10(3) requires the right to vote in the local constituencies for the European Parliament wherever a citizen lives.

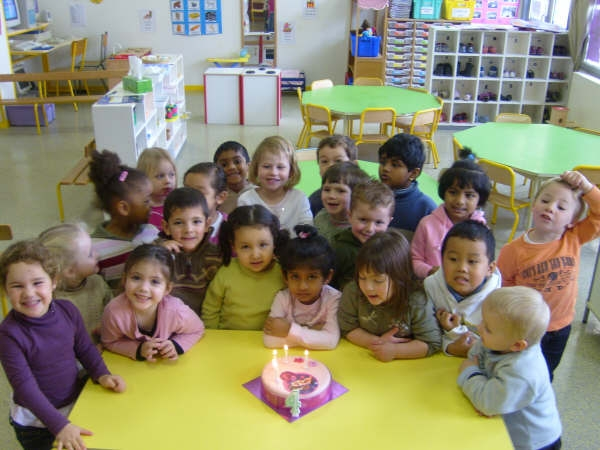
All EU citizens have the right to child support, education, social security and other assistance in EU member states. To ensure people contribute fairly to the communities they live in, there can be qualifying periods of residence and work up to five years.

Fourth, and more debated, article 24 requires that the longer an EU citizen stays in a host state, the more rights they have to access public and welfare services, on the basis of equal treatment. This reflects general principles of equal treatment and citizenship in TFEU articles 18 and 20. In a simple case, in Sala v Freistaat Bayern the Court of Justice held that a Spanish lady who had lived in Germany for 25 years and had a baby was entitled to child support, without the need for a residence permit, because Germans did not need one. In Trojani v Centre public d'aide sociale de Bruxelles, a French man who lived in Belgium for two years was entitled to the "minimex" allowance from the state for a minimum living wage. In Grzelczyk v Centre Public d'Aide Sociale d'Ottignes-Louvain-la-Neuve a French student, who had lived in Belgium for three years, was entitled to receive the "minimex" income support for his fourth year of study. Similarly, in R (Bidar) v London Borough of Ealing the Court of Justice held that it was lawful to require a French UCL economics student lived in the UK for three years before receiving a student loan, but not that he had to have additional "settled status". Similarly, in Commission v Austria, Austria was not entitled to restrict its university places to Austrian students to avoid "structural, staffing and financial problems" if (mainly German) foreign students applied, unless it proved there was an actual problem. However, in Dano v Jobcenter Leipzig, the Court of Justice held that the German government was entitled to deny child support to a Romanian mother who had lived in Germany for three years, but had never worked. Because she lived in Germany for over 3 months, but under five years, she had to show evidence of "sufficient resources", since the Court reasoned the right to equal treatment in article 24 within that time depended on lawful residence under article 7.

=== Establishment and services ===
As well as creating rights for "workers" who generally lack bargaining power in the market, the Treaty on the Functioning of the European Union also protects the "freedom of establishment" in article 49, and "freedom to provide services" in article 56. In Gebhard v Consiglio dell'Ordine degli Avvocati e Procuratori di Milano the Court of Justice held that to be "established" means to participate in economic life "on a stable and continuous basis", while providing "services" meant pursuing activity more "on a temporary basis". This meant that a lawyer from Stuttgart, who had set up chambers in Milan and was censured by the Milan Bar Council for not having registered, should claim for breach of establishment freedom, rather than service freedom. However, the requirements to be registered in Milan before being able to practice would be allowed if they were non-discriminatory, "justified by imperative requirements in the general interest" and proportionately applied. All people or entities that engage in economic activity, particularly the self-employed, or "undertakings" such as companies or firms, have a right to set up an enterprise without unjustified restrictions. The Court of Justice has held that both a member state government and a private party can hinder freedom of establishment, so article 49 has both "vertical" and "horizontal" direct effect. In Reyners v Belgium the Court of Justice held that a refusal to admit a lawyer to the Belgian bar because he lacked Belgian nationality was unjustified. TFEU article 49 says states are exempt from infringing others' freedom of establishment when they exercise "official authority". But regulation of an advocate's work (as opposed to a court's) was not official. By contrast in Commission v Italy the Court of Justice held that a requirement for lawyers in Italy to comply with maximum tariffs unless there was an agreement with a client was not a restriction. The Grand Chamber of the Court of Justice held the commission had not proven that this had any object or effect of limiting practitioners from entering the market. Therefore, there was no prima facie infringement freedom of establishment that needed to be justified.

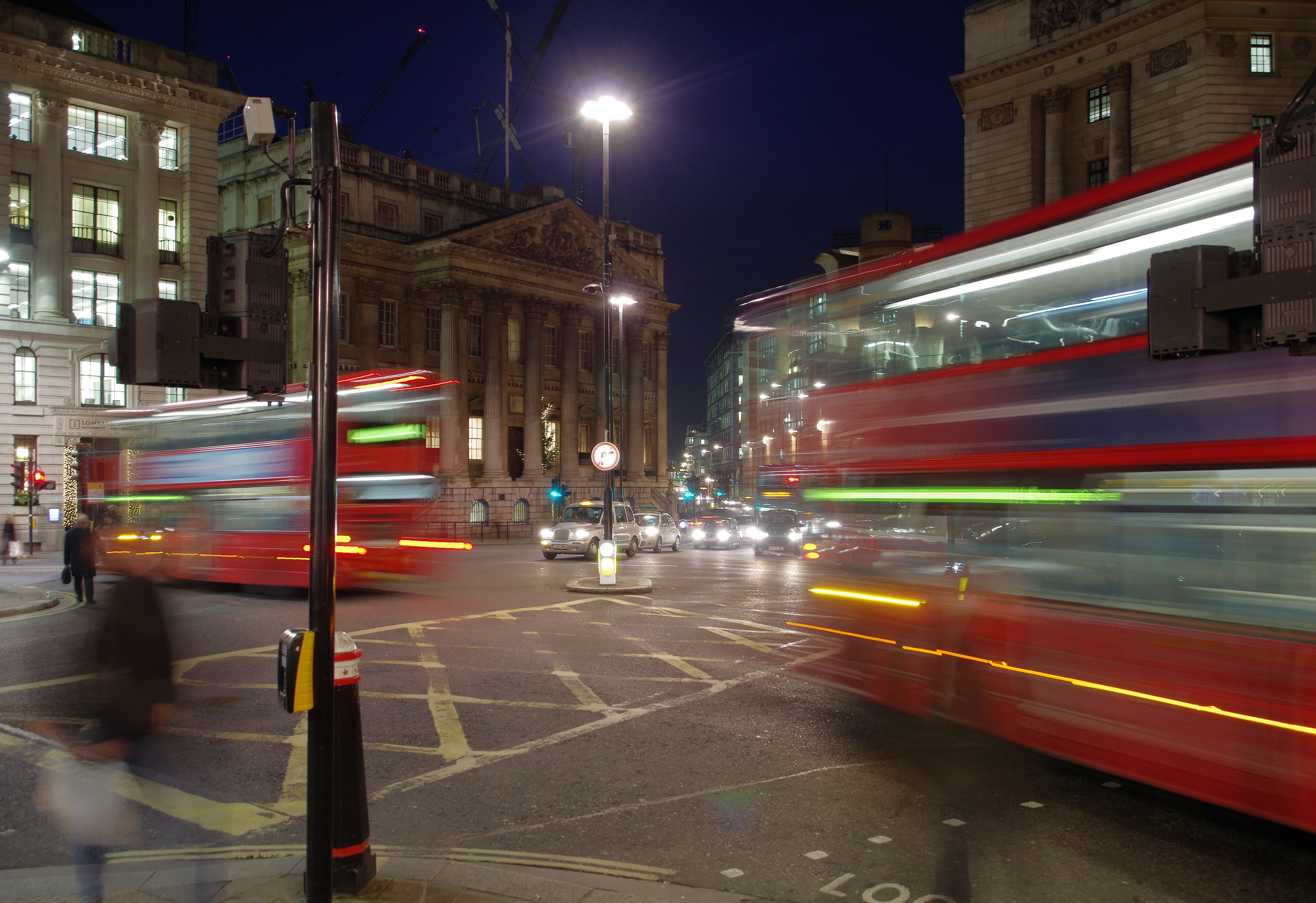
The Court of Justice in Centros Ltd held that people can establish a UK company or any other, to do business EU-wide, but must comply with proportionate requirements in the public interest, such as the basic labour right to a voice at work.

In regard to companies, the Court of Justice held in R (Daily Mail and General Trust plc) v HM Treasury that member states could restrict a company moving its seat of business, without infringing TFEU article 49. This meant the Daily Mail newspaper's parent company could not evade tax by shifting its residence to the Netherlands without first settling its tax bills in the UK. The UK did not need to justify its action, as rules on company seats were not yet harmonised. By contrast, in Centros Ltd v Erhversus-og Selkabssyrelsen the Court of Justice found that a UK limited company operating in Denmark could not be required to comply with Denmark's minimum share capital rules. UK law only required £1 of capital to start a company, while Denmark's legislature took the view companies should only be started up if they had 200,000 Danish krone (around €27,000) to protect creditors if the company failed and went insolvent. The Court of Justice held that Denmark's minimum capital law infringed Centros Ltd's freedom of establishment and could not be justified, because a company in the UK could admittedly provide services in Denmark without being established there, and there were less restrictive means of achieving the aim of creditor protection. This approach was criticised as potentially opening the EU to unjustified regulatory competition, and a race to the bottom in legal standards, like the US state of Delaware, which is argued to attract companies with the worst standards of accountability, and unreasonably low corporate tax. Appearing to meet the concern, in Überseering BV v Nordic Construction GmbH the Court of Justice held that a German court could not deny a Dutch building company the right to enforce a contract in Germany, simply because it was not validly incorporated in Germany. Restrictions on freedom of establishment could be justified by creditor protection, labour rights to participate in work, or the public interest in collecting taxes. But in this case denial of capacity went too far: it was an "outright negation" of the right of establishment. Setting a further limit, in Cartesio Oktató és Szolgáltató bt the Court of Justice held that because corporations are created by law, they must be subject to any rules for formation that a state of incorporation wishes to impose. This meant the Hungarian authorities could prevent a company from shifting its central administration to Italy, while it still operated and was incorporated in Hungary. Thus, the court draws a distinction between the right of establishment for foreign companies (where restrictions must be justified), and the right of the state to determine conditions for companies incorporated in its territory, although it is not entirely clear why.

The "freedom to provide services" under TFEU article 56 applies to people who give services "for remuneration", especially commercial or professional activity. For example, in Van Binsbergen v Bestuur van de Bedrijfsvereniging voor de Metaalnijverheid a Dutch lawyer moved to Belgium while advising a client in a social security case, and was told he could not continue because Dutch law said only people established in the Netherlands could give legal advice. The Court of Justice held that the freedom to provide services applied, it was directly effective, and the rule was probably unjustified: having an address in the member state would be enough to pursue the legitimate aim of good administration of justice. The Court of Justice has held that secondary education falls outside the scope of article 56 because usually the state funds it, but higher education does not. Health care generally counts as a service. In Geraets-Smits v Stichting Ziekenfonds Mrs Geraets-Smits claimed she should be reimbursed by Dutch social insurance for costs of receiving treatment in Germany. The Dutch health authorities regarded the treatment unnecessary, so she argued this restricted the freedom (of the German health clinic) to provide services. Several governments submitted that hospital services should not be regarded as economic, and should not fall within article 56. But the Court of Justice held health was a "service" even though the government (rather than the service recipient) paid for the service. National authorities could be justified in refusing to reimburse patients for medical services abroad if the health care received at home was without undue delay, and it followed "international medical science" on which treatments counted as normal and necessary. The Court requires that the individual circumstances of a patient justify waiting lists, and this is also true in the context of the UK's National Health Service. Aside from public services, another sensitive field of services are those classified as illegal. Josemans v Burgemeester van Maastricht held that the Netherlands' regulation of cannabis consumption, including the prohibitions by some municipalities on tourists (but not Dutch nationals) going to coffee shops, fell outside article 56 altogether. The Court of Justice reasoned that narcotic drugs were controlled in all member states, and so this differed from other cases where prostitution or other quasi-legal activity was subject to restriction.

If an activity does fall within article 56, a restriction can be justified under article 52, or by overriding requirements developed by the Court of Justice. In Alpine Investments BV v Minister van Financiën a business that sold commodities futures (with Merrill Lynch and another banking firms) attempted to challenge a Dutch law that prohibiting cold calling customers. The Court of Justice held the Dutch prohibition pursued a legitimate aim to prevent "undesirable developments in securities trading" including protecting the consumer from aggressive sales tactics, thus maintaining confidence in the Dutch markets. In Omega Spielhallen GmbH v Bonn a "laserdrome" business was banned by the Bonn council. It bought fake laser gun services from a UK firm called Pulsar Ltd, but residents had protested against "playing at killing" entertainment. The Court of Justice held that the German constitutional value of human dignity, which underpinned the ban, did count as a justified restriction on freedom to provide services. In Liga Portuguesa de Futebol v Santa Casa da Misericórdia de Lisboa the Court of Justice also held that the state monopoly on gambling, and a penalty for a Gibraltar firm that had sold internet gambling services, was justified to prevent fraud and gambling where people's views were highly divergent. The ban was proportionate as this was an appropriate and necessary way to tackle the serious problems of fraud that arise over the internet. In the Services Directive a group of justifications were codified in article 16, which the case law has developed.

=== Capital ===
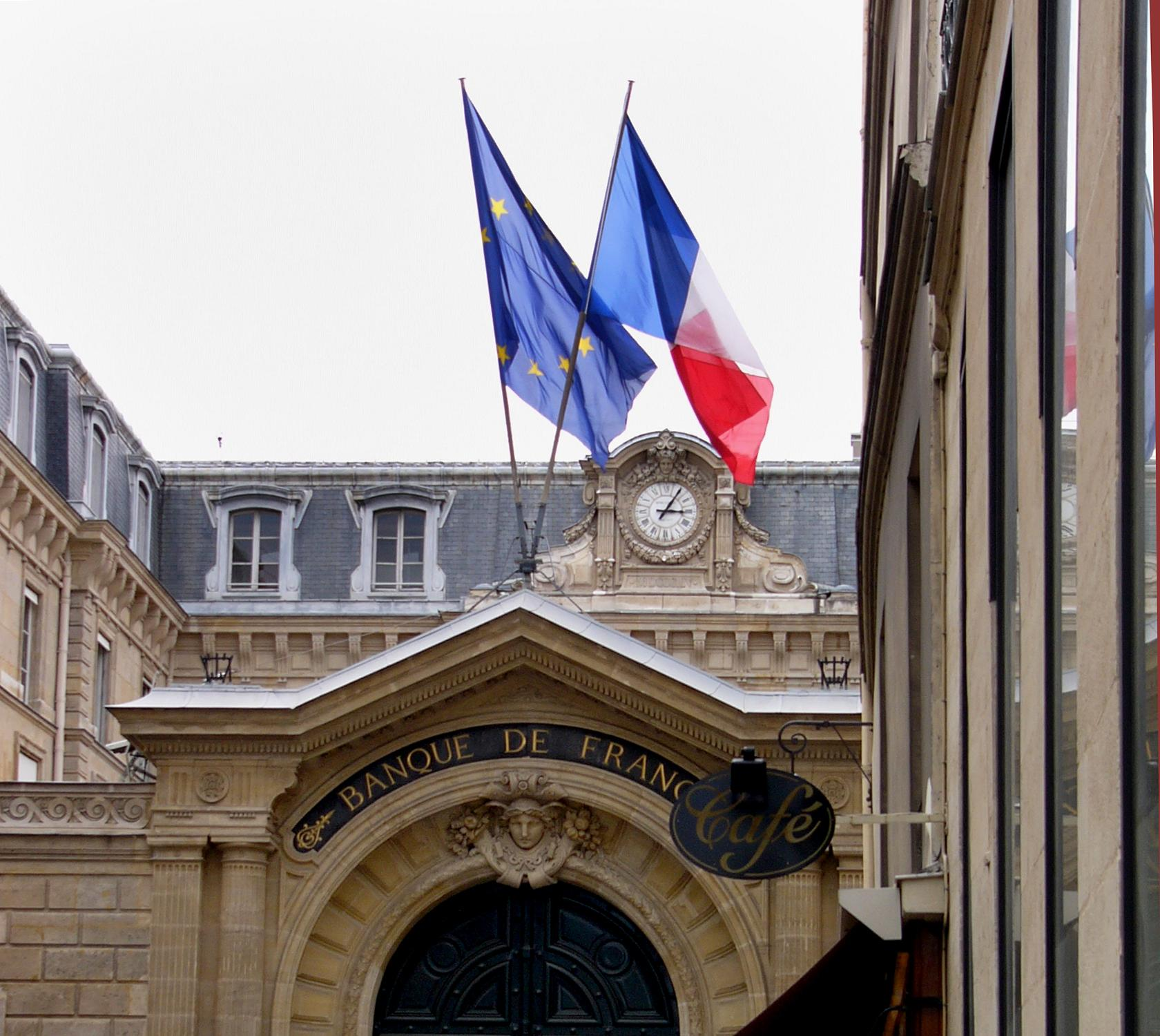
The European System of Central Banks, including the ECB and member state banks like the Banque de France, has been criticised for failing to fulfil its mandate. It interpreted the requirement for price stability as requiring wage suppression and growing inequality in its dealings on the European debt crisis.

Free movement of capital was traditionally seen as the fourth freedom, after goods, workers and persons, services and establishment. The original Treaty of Rome required that restrictions on free capital flows only be removed to the extent necessary for the common market. From the Treaty of Maastricht, now in TFEU article 63, "all restrictions on the movement of capital between Member States and between Member States and third countries shall be prohibited". This means capital controls of various kinds are prohibited, including limits on buying currency, limits on buying company shares or financial assets, or government approval requirements for foreign investment. By contrast, taxation of capital, including corporate tax, capital gains tax and Financial transaction tax are not affected so long as they do not discriminate by nationality. According to the Capital Movement Directive 1988, Annex I, 13 categories of capital which must move free are covered. In Baars v Inspecteur der Belastingen Particulieren the Court of Justice held that for investments in companies, the capital rules, rather than freedom of establishment rules, were engaged if an investment did not enable a "definite influence" through shareholder voting or other rights by the investor. That case held a Dutch Wealth Tax Act 1964 unjustifiably exempted Dutch investments, but not Mr Baars' investments in an Irish company, from the tax: the wealth tax, or exemptions, had to be applied equally. On the other hand, TFEU article 65(1) does not prevent taxes that distinguish taxpayers based on their residence or the location of an investment (as taxes commonly focus on a person's actual source of profit) or any measures to prevent tax evasion. Apart from tax cases, largely following from cases originating in the UK, a series of cases held that government owned golden shares were unlawful. In Commission v Germany the Commission claimed the 1960 German Volkswagen Act violated article 63, in that §2(1) restricted any party having voting rights exceeding 20% of the company, and §4(3) allowed a minority of 20% of shares held by the Lower Saxony government to block any decisions. Although this was not an impediment to actual purchase of shares, or receipt of dividends by any shareholder, the Court of Justice's Grand Chamber agreed that it was disproportionate for the government's stated aim of protecting workers or minority shareholders. Similarly, in Commission v Portugal the Court of Justice held that Portugal infringed free movement of capital by retaining golden shares in Portugal Telecom that enabled disproportionate voting rights, by creating a "deterrent effect on portfolio investments" and reducing "the attractiveness of an investment". This suggested the Court's preference that a government, if it sought public ownership or control, should nationalise in full the desired proportion of a company in line with TFEU article 345.

The final stage of completely free movement of capital was thought to require a single currency and monetary policy, eliminating the transaction costs and fluctuations of currency exchange between member states but not between member states and third countries (TFEU article 63). Following a Report of the Delors Commission in 1988, the Treaty of Maastricht made economic and monetary union an objective, first by completing the internal market, second by creating a European System of Central Banks to coordinate common monetary policy, and third by locking exchange rates and introducing a single currency, the euro. Today, 19 member states have adopted the euro, while 9 member states have either determined to opt-out or their accession has been delayed, particularly since the European debt crisis. According to TFEU articles 119 and 127, the objective of the European Central Bank and other central banks ought to be price stability. This has been criticised for apparently being superior to the objective of full employment in the Treaty on European Union article 3.

== Social and market regulations ==
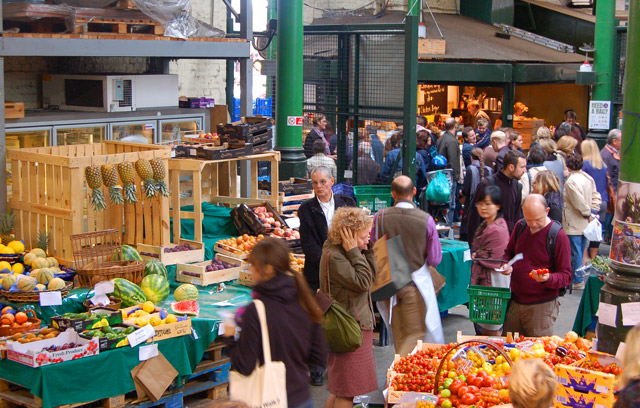
All enterprises and markets are governed through legal rights for consumers, employees, investors or the public, in laws of property, contract, competition, environmental law and other social and economic rights. EU law harmonises a minimum floor of rights so that stakeholders can fully participate in social progress.

While the European Economic Community originally focused on free movement, and dismantling barriers to trade, more EU law today concerns regulation of the "social market economy". In 1976 the Court of Justice said in Defrenne v Sabena the goal was "not merely an economic union", but to "ensure social progress and seek the constant improvement of the living and working conditions of their peoples". On this view, stakeholders in each member state might not have the capacity to take advantage of expanding trade in a globalising economy. Groups with greater bargaining power can exploit weaker legal rights in other member states. For example, a corporation could shift production to member states with a lower minimum wage, to increase shareholder profit, even if production costs more and workers are paid less. This would mean an aggregate loss of social wealth, and a "race to the bottom" in human development. To make globalisation fair, the EU establishes a minimum floor of rights for the stakeholders in enterprise: for consumers, workers, investors, shareholders, creditors, and the public. Each field of law is vast, so EU law is designed to be subsidiary to comprehensive rules in each member state. Member states may go beyond the harmonised minimum, acting as "laboratories of democracy".

EU law makes basic standards of "exit" (where markets operate), rights (enforceable in court), and "voice" (especially through votes) in enterprise. Rules of competition law balance the interests of different groups, generally to favour consumers, for the larger purpose in the Treaty on European Union article 3(3) of a "highly competitive social market economy". The EU is bound by the Treaty on the Functioning of the European Union article 345 to "in no way prejudice the rules in Member States governing the system of property ownership". This means the EU is bound to be neutral to member state's choice to take enterprises into public ownership, or to privatise them. While there have been academic proposals for a European Civil Code, and projects to frame non-binding principles of contract and tort, harmonisation has only occurred for conflict of laws and intellectual property.

=== Consumer protection ===
Protection of European consumers has been a central part of developing the EU internal market. The Treaty on the Functioning of the European Union article 169 enables the EU to follow the ordinary legislative procedure to protect consumers "health, safety and economic interests" and promote rights to "information, education and to organise themselves in order to safeguard their interests". All member states may grant higher protection, and a "high level of consumer protection" is regarded as a fundamental right. Beyond these general principles, and outside specific sectors, there are four main Directives: the Product Liability Directive 1985, Unfair Terms in Consumer Contracts Directive 1993, Unfair Commercial Practices Directive 2005 and the Consumer Rights Directive 2011, requiring information and cancellation rights for consumers. As a whole, the law is designed to ensure that consumers in the EU are entitled to the same minimum rights wherever they shop, and largely follows inspiration from theories of consumer protection developed in California and the Consumer Bill of Rights proclaimed by John F. Kennedy in 1962. The Court of Justice has continually affirmed that the need for more consumer rights (than in commercial contracts) both because consumers tend to lack information, and they have less bargaining power.

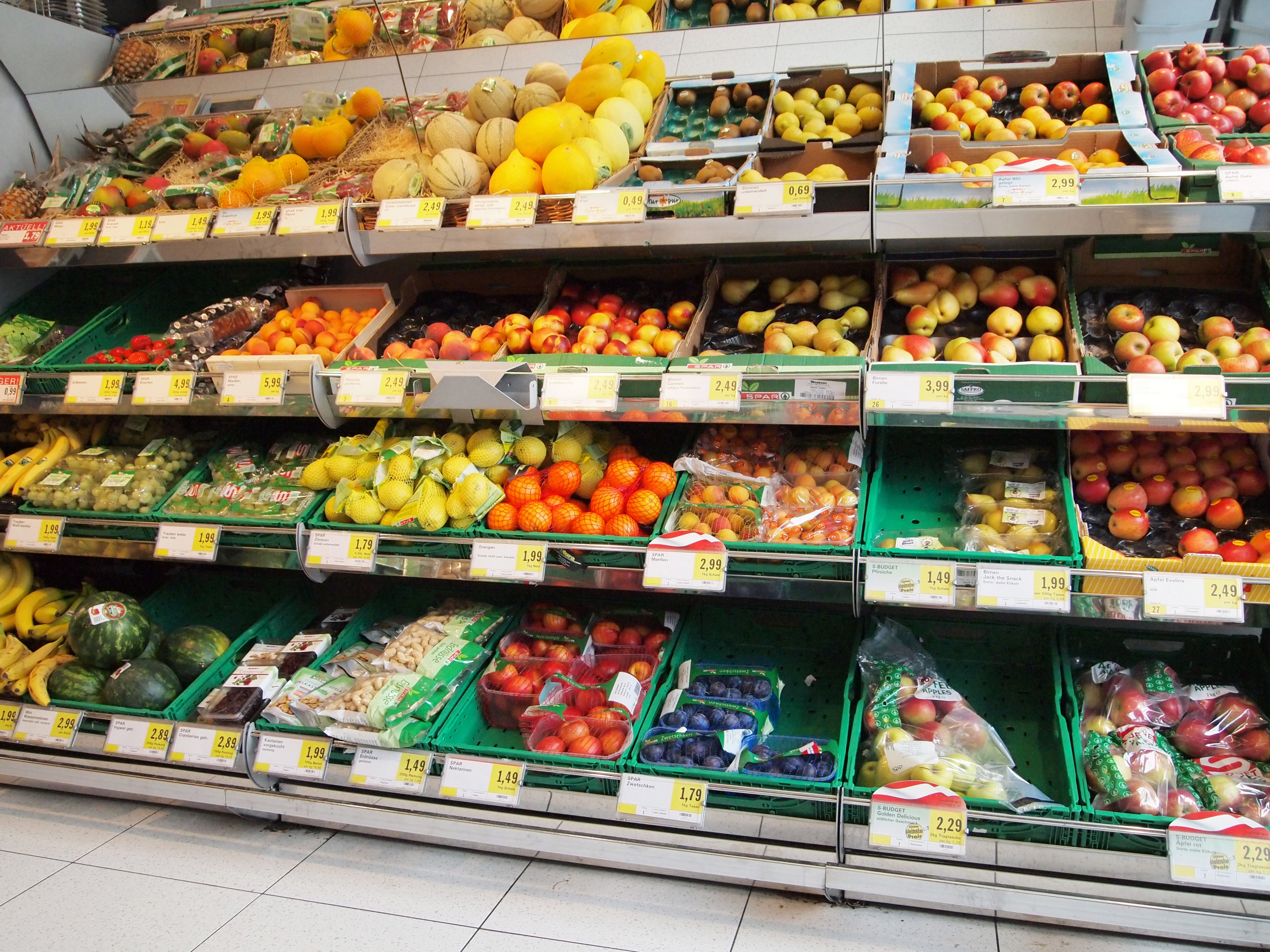
Due to their unequal bargaining power, consumers are entitled to a legislative "charter of rights" to safe and healthy products, fair terms, proper information free from misleading advertising and marketing, and rights of cancellation.

The Product Liability Directive 1985 was the first consumer protection measure. It creates strict enterprise liability for all producers and retailers for any harm to consumers from products, as a way to promote basic standards of health and safety. Any producer, or supplier if the ultimate producer is insolvent, of a product is strictly liable to compensate a consumer for any damage caused by a defective product. A "defect" is anything which falls below what a consumer is entitled to expect, and this essentially means that products should be safe for their purpose. A narrow defensive is available if a producer can show that a defect could not be known by any scientific method, thought this has never been successfully invoked, because it is generally thought a profit making enterprise should not be able to externalise the risks of its activities.

The Unfair Terms in Consumer Contracts Directive 1993 was the second main measure. Under article 3(1) a term is unfair, and not binding, if it is not "individually negotiated| and "if, contrary to the requirement of good faith, it causes a significant imbalance in the parties' rights and obligations arising under the contract, to the detriment of the consumer". The Court of Justice has continually affirmed that the Directive, as recital 16 states, "is based on the idea that the consumer is in a weak position vis-à-vis the seller or supplier, as regards both his bargaining power and his level of knowledge". Terms which are very skewed, are to be conclusively regarded as contrary to "good faith" and therefore unfair. For example, in RWE AG v Verbraucherzentrale NRW eV clauses in gas supply contracts enabling corporation, RWE, to unilaterally vary prices were advised by the Court of Justice to be not sufficiently transparent, and therefore unfair. In Brusse v Jahani BV the Court of Justice advised that clauses in a tenancy contract requiring tenants pay €25 per day were likely unfair, and would have to be entirely void without replacement, if they were not substituted with more precise mandatory terms in national legislation. In Aziz v Caixa d'Estalvis de Catalunya, following the 2008 financial crisis, the European Court of Justice advised that even terms regarding repossession of homes in Spain had to be assessed for fairness by national courts. In Kušionová v SMART Capital a.s., the Court of Justice held that consumer law was to be interpreted in the light of fundamental rights, including the right to housing, if a home could be repossessed. Because consumer law operates through Directives, national courts have the final say on applying the general principles set out by the Court of Justice's case law.

- Unfair Commercial Practices Directive 2005/29/EC
- Consumer Rights Directive 2011/83/EU
- Payment Services Directive 2007/64/EC
- Late Payments Directive 2011/7/EU

=== Labour rights ===
While free movement of workers was central to the first European Economic Community agreement, the development of European labour law has been a gradual process. Originally, the Ohlin Report of 1956 recommended that labour standards did not need to be harmonised, although a general principle of anti-discrimination between men and women was included in the early Treaties. Increasingly, the absence of labour rights was seen as inadequate given the capacity for a "race to the bottom" in international trade if corporations can shift jobs and production to countries with low wages. Today, the EU is required under TFEU article 147 to contribute to a "high level of employment by encouraging cooperation between Member States". This has not resulted in legislation, which usually requires taxation and fiscal stimulus for significant change, while the European Central Bank's monetary policy has been acutely controversial during the European debt crisis. Under article 153(1), the EU is able to use the ordinary legislation procedure on a list of labour law fields. This notably excludes wage regulation and collective bargaining. Generally, four main fields of EU regulation of labour rights touch (1) individual labour rights, (2) anti-discrimination regulations, (3) rights to information, consultation, and participation at work, and (4) rights to job security. In virtually all cases, the EU follows the principle that member states can always create rights more beneficial to workers. This is because the fundamental principle of labour law is that employees' unequal bargaining power justifies substitution of rules in property and contract with positive social rights so that people may earn a living to fully participate in a democratic society. The EU's competences generally follow principles codified in the Community Charter of the Fundamental Social Rights of Workers 1989, introduced in the "social chapter" of the Treaty of Maastricht. Initially the UK had opted-out, because of opposition by the Conservative Party, but was acceded to when the Labour Party won the 1997 general election in the Treaty of Amsterdam.

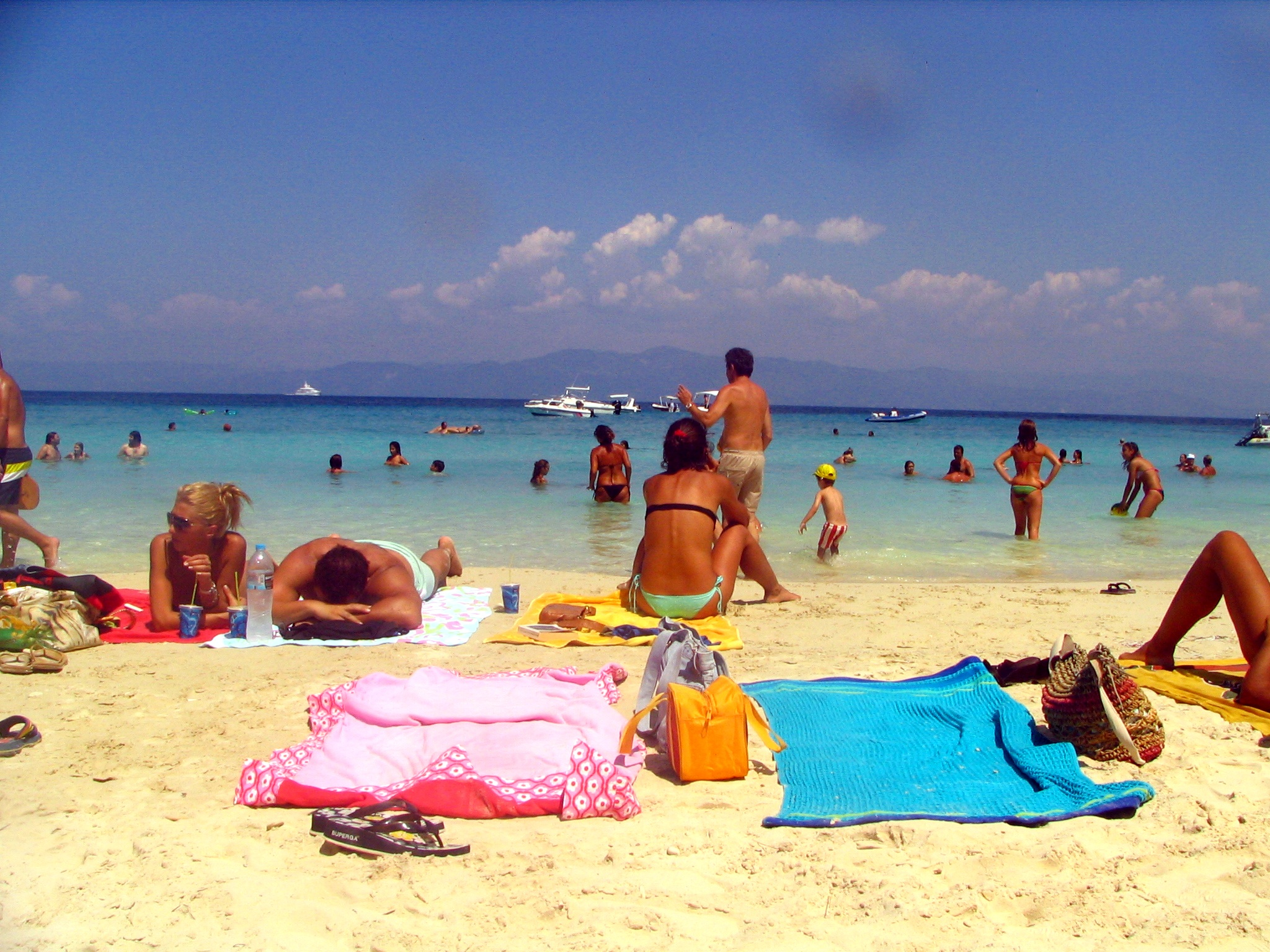
The European Social Charter 1961 art 2(1) requires "the working week to be progressively reduced" with "increase of productivity". The Working Time Directive 2003 requires 28 paid holidays a year. With two-day weekends, most people in the EU work two-thirds of the year or less.

The first group of Directives create a range of individual rights in EU employment relationships. The Employment Information Directive 1991 requires that every employee (however defined by member state law) has the right to a written statement of their employment contract. While there is no wage regulation, the Institutions for Occupational Retirement Provision Directive 2003 requires that pension benefits are protected through a national insurance fund, that information is provided to beneficiaries, and minimum standards of governance are observed. Most member states go far beyond these requirements, particularly by requiring a vote for employees in who manages their money. Reflecting basic standards in the Universal Declaration of Human Rights and ILO Conventions, the Working Time Directive 2003 requires a minimum of 4 weeks (totalling 28 days) paid holidays each year, a minimum of 20-minute paid rest breaks for 6-hour work shifts, limits on night work or time spent on dangerous work, and a maximum 48-hour working week unless a worker individually consents. The Parental Leave Directive 2010 creates a bare minimum of 4 months of unpaid leave for parents (mothers, fathers, or legal guardians) to care for children before they turn 8 years old, and the Pregnant Workers Directive 1992 creates a right for mothers to a minimum of 14 weeks' paid leave to care for children. Finally, the Safety and Health at Work Directive 1989 requires basic requirements to prevent and insure against workplace risks, with employee consultation and participation, and this is complemented by specialised Directives, ranging from work equipment to dangerous industries. In almost all cases, all member states go significantly beyond this minimum. The objective of transnational regulation is therefore to progressively raise the minimum floor in line with economic development. Second, equality was affirmed by the Court of Justice in Kücükdeveci v Swedex GmbH & Co KG to be a general principle of EU law. Further to this, the Part-time Work Directive 1997, Fixed-term Work Directive 1999 and Temporary Agency Work Directive 2008 generally require that people who do not have ordinary full-time, permanent contracts are treated no less favourably than their colleagues. However, the scope of the protected worker is left to member state law, and the TAWD 2008 only applies to "basic working conditions" (mostly pay, working hours and participation rights) and enabled member states to have a qualifying period. The Race Equality Directive 2000, Equality Framework Directive 2000 and Equal Treatment Directive 2006 prohibit discrimination based on sexual orientation, disability, religion or belief, age, race and gender. As well as "direct discrimination", there is a prohibition on "indirect discrimination" where employers apply a neutral rule to everybody, but this has a disproportionate impact on the protected group. The rules are not consolidated, and on gender pay potentially limited in not enabling a hypothetical comparator, or comparators in outsourced business. Equality rules do not yet apply to child care rights, which only give women substantial time off, and consequently hinder equality in men and women caring for children after birth, and pursuing their careers.

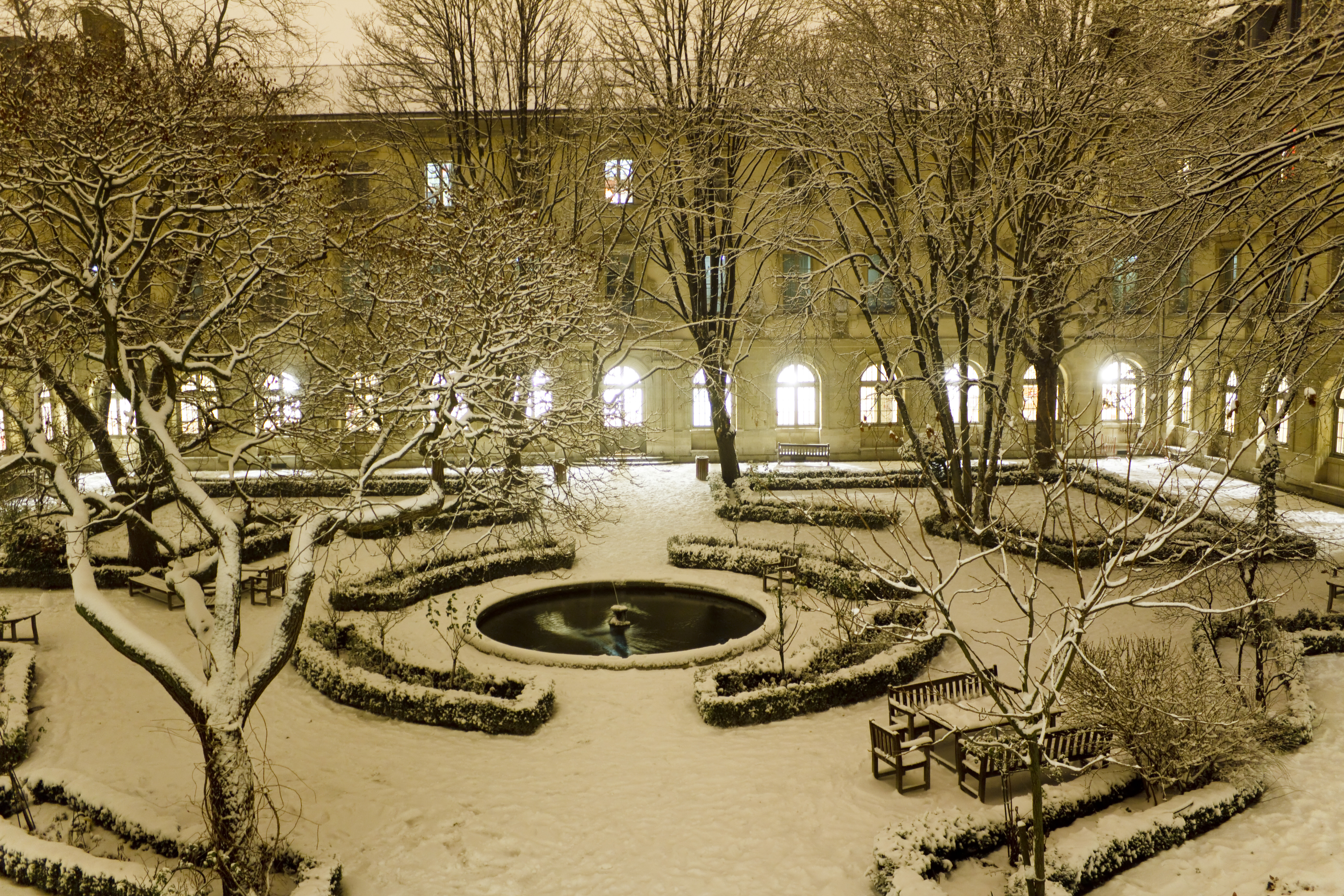
A majority of EU countries have legislation, such the Codetermination Act 1976 or the statute for the École normale supérieure in Paris, which protect employees' right to vote for a corporation's management. This is reflected in the Employee Involvement Directive 2001 for European Companies.

Third, the EU is formally not enabled to legislate on collective bargaining, although the EU, with all member states, is bound by the jurisprudence of the European Court of Human Rights on freedom of association. In Wilson and Palmer v United Kingdom the Court held that any detriment for membership of a trade union was incompatible with article 11, and in Demir and Baykara v Turkey the Court held "the right to bargain collectively with the employer has, in principle, become one of the essential elements" of article 11. This approach, which includes affirmation of the fundamental right to strike in all democratic member states, has been seen as lying in tension with some of the Court of Justice's previous case law, notably ITWF v Viking Line ABP and Laval Un Partneri Ltd v Svenska Byggnadsarbetareforbundet. These controversial decisions, quickly disapproved by legislative measures, suggested the fundamental right of workers to take collective action was subordinate to business freedom to establish and provide services. More positively, the Information and Consultation Directive 2002 requires that workplaces with over 20 or 50 staff have the right to set up elected work councils with a range of binding rights, the European Works Council Directive 2009 enables work councils transnationally, and the Employee Involvement Directive 2001 requires representation of workers on company boards in some European Companies. If a company transforms from a member state corporation to incorporate under the European Company Regulation 2001, employees are entitled to no less favourable representation than under the member state's existing board participation laws. This is practically important as a majority of EU member states require employee representation on company boards. Fourth, minimum job security rights are provided by three Directives. The Collective Redundancies Directive 1998 specifies that minimum periods of notice and consultation occur if more than a set number of jobs in a workplace are at risk. The Transfers of Undertakings Directive 2001 require that staff retain all contractual rights, unless there is an independent economic, technical or organisational reason, if their workplace is sold from one company to another. Last, the Insolvency Protection Directive 2008 requires that employees' wage claims are protected in case their employer falls insolvent. This last Directive gave rise to Francovich v Italy, where the Court of Justice affirmed that member states which fail to implement the minimum standards in EU Directives are liable to pay compensation to employees who should have rights under them.

=== Companies and investment ===
Like labour regulation, European company law is not a complete system and there is no such thing as a self-standing European corporation. Instead, a series of Directives require minimum standards, usually protecting investors, to be implemented in national corporate laws. The largest in Europe remain member state incorporations, such as the UK "plc", the German "AG" or the French "SA". There is however, a "European Company" (or Societas Europaea, abbreviated to "SE") created by the Statute for a European Company Regulation 2001. This sets out basic provisions on the method of registration (e.g. by merger or reincorporation of an existing company) but then states that wherever the SE has its registered office, the law of that member state supplements the rules of the Statute. The Employee Involvement Directive 2001 also adds that, when an SE is incorporated, employees have the default right to retain all existing representation on the board of directors that they have, unless the negotiate by collective agreement a different or better plan than is provided for in existing member state law. Other than this, most important standards in a typical company law are left to member state law, so long as they comply with further minimum requirements in the company law directives. Duties owed by the board of directors to the company and its stakeholders, or the right to bring derivative claims to vindicate constitutional rights, are not generally regulated by EU law. Nor are rights of pre-emption to buy shares, nor rights of any party regarding claims by tort, contract or piercing the corporate veil to hold directors and shareholders accountable. However, Directives do require minimum rights on company formation, capital maintenance, accounting and audit, market regulation, board neutrality in a takeover bid, rules on mergers, and management of cross-border insolvency. The omission of minimum standards is important since the Court of Justice held in Centros that freedom of establishment requires companies operate in any member state they choose. This has been argued to risk a "race to the bottom" in standards, although the Court of Justice soon affirmed in Inspire Art that companies must still comply with proportionate requirements that are in the "public interest".

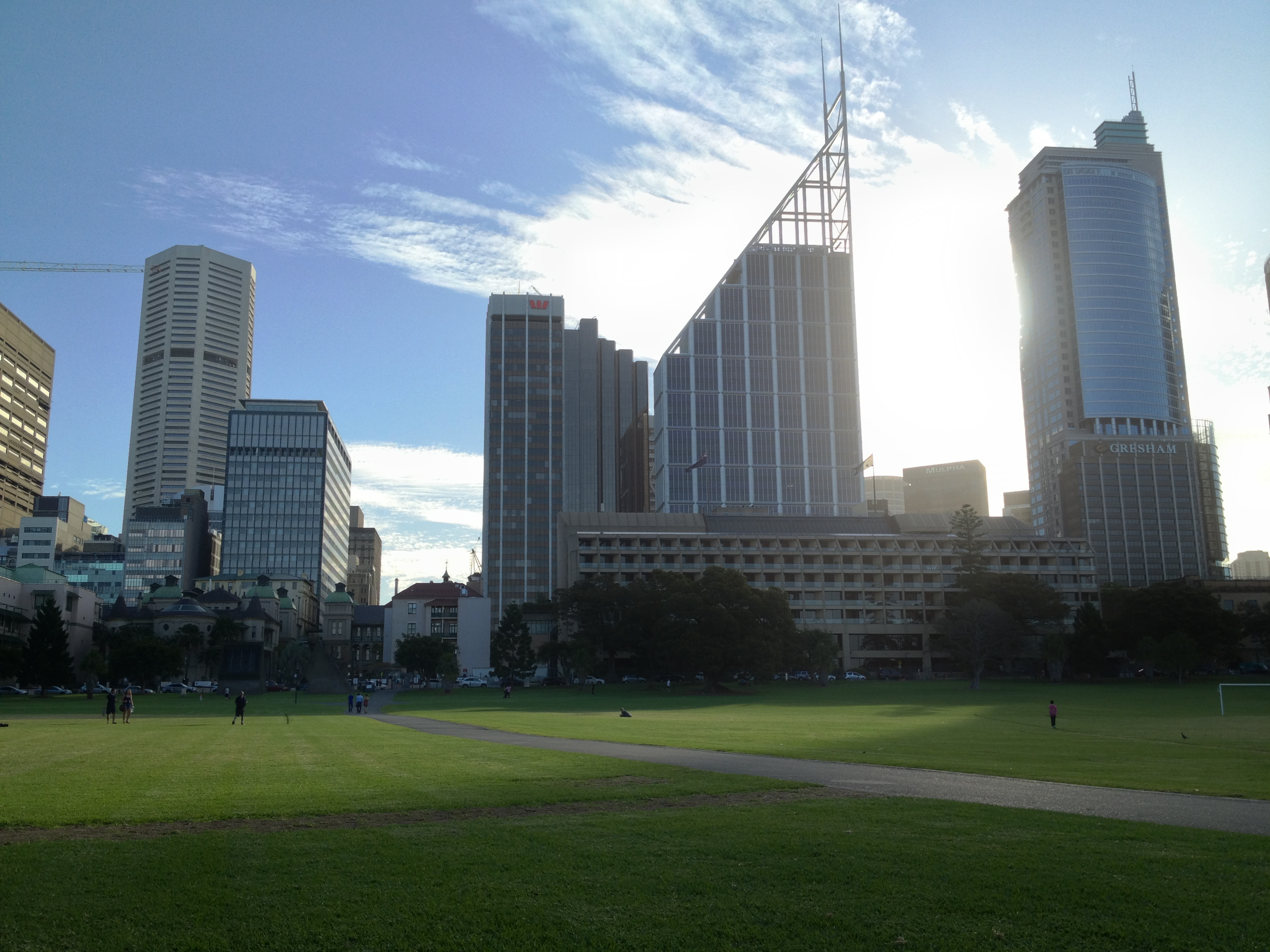
The Shareholder Rights Directive 2007 requires proxy vote instructions are followed. There EU has not yet acted, as have the Swiss, to prevent asset managers or banks like Deutsche Bank casting votes on company shares bought with other people's money, and to empower the ultimate investors.

Among the most important governance standards are rights vote for who is on the board of directors for investors of labour and capital. A Draft Fifth Company Law Directive proposed in 1972, which would have required EU-wide rights for employees to vote for boards stalled mainly because it attempted to require two-tier board structures, although most EU member states have codetermination today with unified boards. The Shareholder Rights Directive 2007 requires shareholders be able to make proposals, ask questions at meetings, vote by proxy and vote through intermediaries. This has become increasingly important as most company shares are held by institutional investors (primarily asset managers or banks, depending on the member state) who are holding "other people's money". A large proportion of this money comes from employees and other people saving for retirement, but who do not have an effective voice. Unlike Switzerland after a 2013 people's initiative, or the U.S. Dodd-Frank Act 2010 in relation to brokers, the EU has not yet prevented intermediaries casting votes without express instructions of beneficiaries. This concentrates power into a small number of financial institutions, and creates the potential for conflicts of interest where financial institutions sell retirement, banking or products to companies in which they cast votes with other people's money. A series of rights for ultimate investors exist in the Institutions for Occupational Retirement Provision Directive 2003. This requires duties of disclosure in how a retirement fund is run, funding and insurance to guard against insolvency, but not yet that voting rights are only cast on the instructions of investors. By contrast, the Undertakings for Collective Investment in Transferable Securities Directive 2009 does suggest that investors in a mutual fund or ("collective investment scheme") should control the voting rights.

The UCITS Directive 2009 is primarily concerned with creating a "passport". If a firm complies with rules on authorisation, and governance of the management and investment companies in an overall fund structure, it can sell its shares in a collective investment scheme across the EU. This forms a broader package of Directives on securities and financial market regulation, much of which has been shaped by experience in the 2008 financial crisis. Additional rules on remuneration practices, separating depositary bodies in firms from management and investment companies, and more penalties for violations were inserted in 2014. These measures are meant to decrease the risk to investors that an investment goes insolvent. The Markets in Financial Instruments Directive 2004 applies to other businesses selling financial instruments. It requires similar authorisation procedures to have a "passport" to sell in any EU country, and transparency of financial contracts through duties to disclose material information about products being sold, including disclosure of potential conflicts of interest with clients. The Alternative Investment Fund Managers Directive 2011 applies to firms with massive quantities of capital, over €100 million, essentially hedge funds and private equity firms. Similarly, it requires authorisation to sell products EU wide, and then basic transparency requirements on products being sold, requirements in remuneration policies for fund managers that are perceived to reduce "risk" or make pay "performance" related. They do not, however, require limits to pay. There are general prohibitions on conflicts of interest, and specialised prohibitions on asset stripping. The Solvency II Directive 2009 is directed particularly at insurance firms, requiring minimum capital and best practices in valuation of assets, again to avoid insolvency. The Capital Requirements Directives contain analogous rules, with a similar goals, for banks. To administer the new rules, the European System of Financial Supervision was established in 2011, and consists of three main branches: the European Securities and Markets Authority in Paris, the European Banking Authority in London and the European Insurance and Occupational Pensions Authority in Frankfurt.

=== Competition law ===
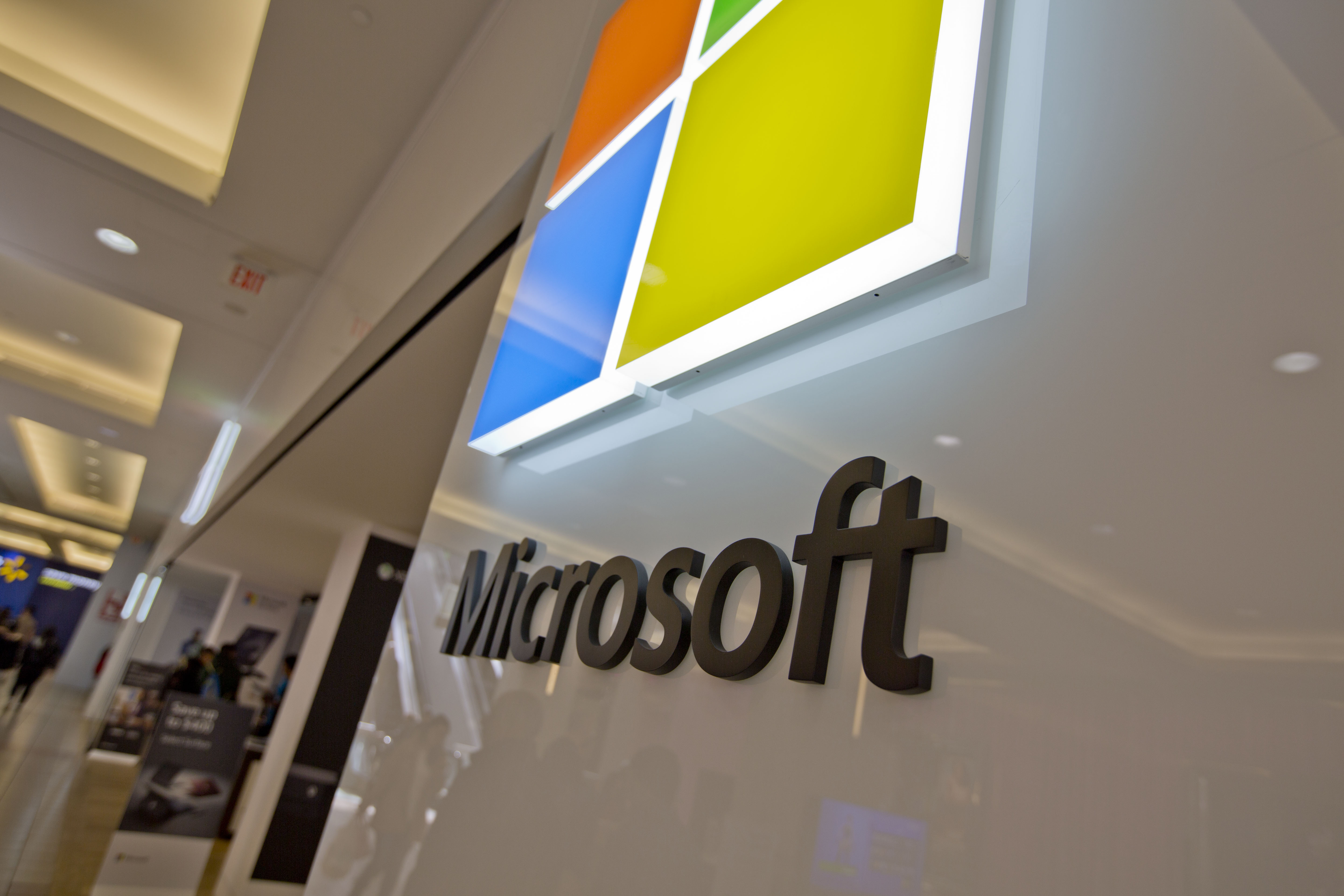
In Microsoft Corp v Commission, Microsoft was fined €497 million for tying sales of its operating system to its media player, to bankrupt competitor media players. Maximum fines can reach 10% of worldwide turnover.

Competition law aims "to prevent competition from being distorted to the detriment of the public interest, individual undertakings and consumers", especially by limiting big business power. It covers all types of enterprise or "undertaking" regardless of legal form, or "every entity engaged in an economic activity", but not non-profit organisations based on the principle of solidarity, or bodies carrying out a regulatory function. Employees and trade unions are not undertakings, and are outside the scope of competition law, and so are solo self-employed workers, because on long-standing consensus in international law labour is not a commodity, and workers have structurally unequal bargaining power compared to business and employers. A legal professional body setting regulatory standards was held to be outside competition law, and so were the rules of the International Olympic Committee and the International Swimming Federation in prohibiting drugs, because although drugs might increase "competition", the "integrity and objectivity of competitive sport" was more important. EU competition law only regulates activities where trade between member states is affected to an "appreciable" degree, but member states may have higher standards that comply with social objectives. The four most important sets of rules relate to monopolies and enterprises with a dominant position, mergers and takeovers, cartels or collusive practices, and state aid.

First, Article 102 of the Treaty on the Functioning of the European Union prohibits "abuse by one or more undertakings of a dominant position". A "dominant position" is presumed to exist with over a 50% market share, and may exist with a 39.7% market share. There may also be dominance through control of data, or by a group of undertakings acting collectively, and a corporate group will be treated as a "single economic unit" for the purpose of calculating market share. The prohibited categories of "abuse" are unlimited, but article 102 explicitly spells out the bans on (a) "unfair purchase or selling prices", (b) "limiting production", (c) "applying dissimilar conditions to equivalent transactions", and (d) imposing unconnected "supplementary obligations" to contracts. In a leading case on (a) unfair prices, United Brands Co v Commission held that, although a banana company had a dominant position in its product and geographic markets (because bananas were not easily substituted with other fruit, and its relevant market share was 40 to 45%), prices 7% higher than rivals were not enough to be an abuse. By contrast prices 25% higher than a company's estimated costs were found to be unfair. Unfair pricing also includes predatory pricing, where a company cuts its own selling prices to bankrupt a competitor: there is a presumption of abuse if a company prices "below average variable costs", namely "those which vary depending on the quantities produced". There is no requirement to show losses might be recouped. A leading case on (b) limiting production is AstraZeneca plc v Commission, where a drug company was fined €60 million for misleading public authorities to secure a longer patent for a medicine it called Losec, so limiting public use. In 2022, in Google LLC v Commission the General Court upheld a €4.125 billion fine against Google for the "obstruction of development and distribution of competing Android operating systems" by paying manufacturers to not install any version other than Google's own. Refusal to supply goods or services may also be abusive, as in Commercial Solvents Corporation v Commission where the subsidiary of CSC stopped selling an ingredient for a drug to combat tuberculosis to a competitor after it itself entered the drug market. Similarly in Microsoft Corp v Commission, Microsoft was fined €497 million for, among other things, refusing to give Sun Microsystems and other competitors information needed to build servers after Microsoft itself entered the server market.

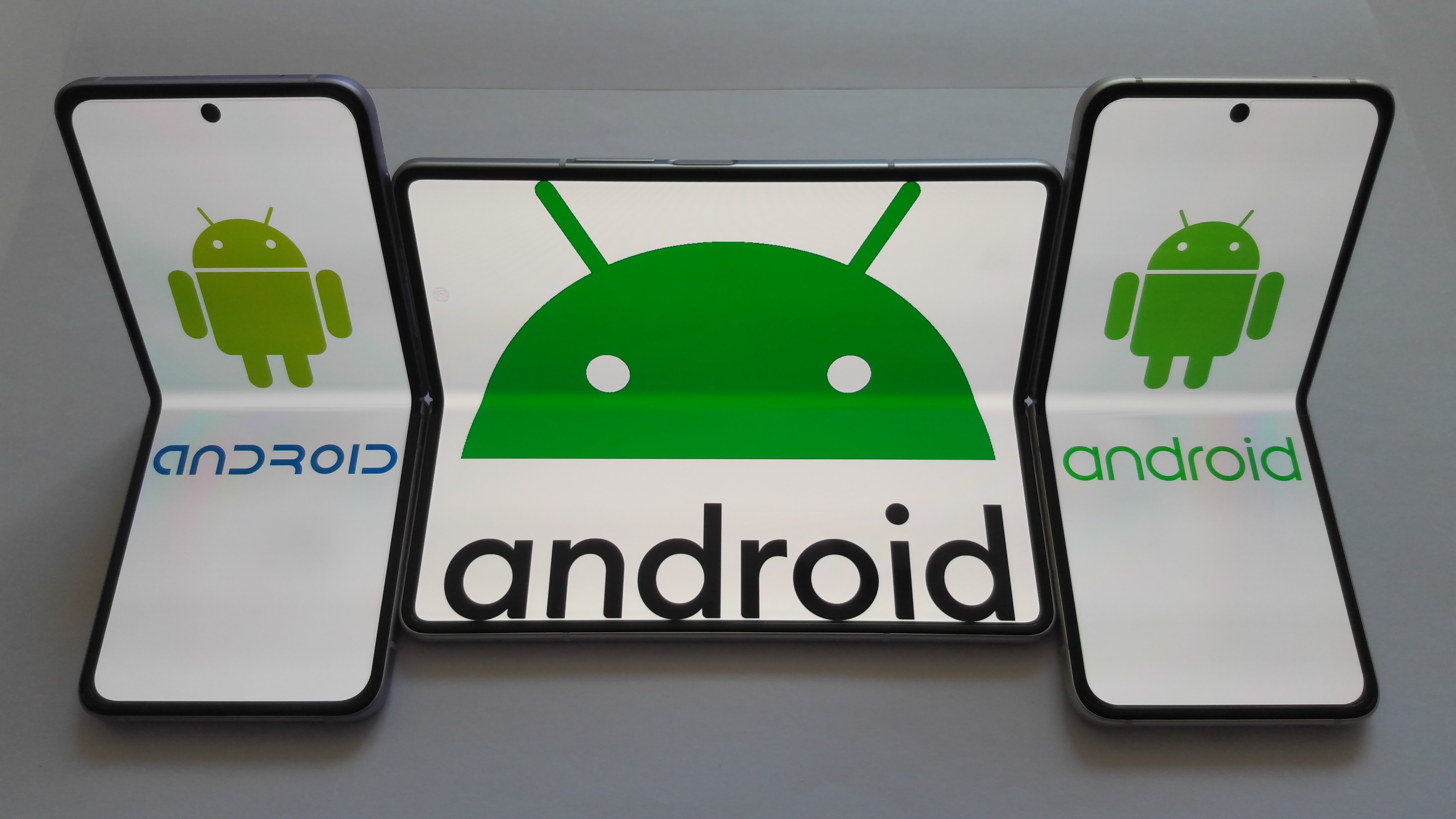
In Google LLC v Commission Google was fined €4.125 billion for bribing phone-makers to pre-install only its Operating System version of Android.

Under the third type of abuse, (c) unlawful discrimination, in British Airways plc v Commission it was held that British Airways abused its dominant position by giving some travel agents extra payment to promote its tickets over others. This made "market entry very difficult" and frustrated the ability of "co-contractors to choose between various sources of supply or commercial partners". Under (d) examples of the abuse of imposing supplementary obligations include the Microsoft Corp v Commission case, where Microsoft bundled a pre-installed media player into Windows OS sales, which had the effect of damaging competitor businesses such as RealPlayer. By contrast, in Intel Corp v Commission, Intel was fined €1.06 billion by the commission for giving rebates on x86 computer processors if manufacturers bought over 80% of their chips only from Intel. This had the effect of "tying customers to the undertaking in a dominant position". However the fine was annulled on the ground that the commission had not adequately proven an anti-competitive effect, so in 2023 the Commission imposed a smaller €376 million fine. Second, the Merger Regulation 2004 applies to "concentrations" (any merger or acquisition), that generally have a value of at least €100 million turnover in the EU if it "would significantly impede effective competition" by creating or strengthening a dominant position. While mergers between direct ("horizontal") competitors are carefully scrutinised upon mandatory notification to the commission, vertical or conglomerate mergers are often allowed where a competitor is not removed. This has led to increasingly large business groups, with ever greater power.

Third, Article 101 of the TFEU prohibits cartels or collusive practices, including competitors engaging in (a) price fixing, (b) limiting production, (c) sharing markets, (d) applying dissimilar conditions to equivalent transactions, and (e) making contracts subject to unconnected obligations. According to Article 101(2) any such agreements between undertakings are automatically void. Article 101(3) establishes exemptions, if the collusion is for distributional or technological innovation, gives consumers a "fair share" of the benefit and does not include unreasonable restraints that risk eliminating competition anywhere. For example, in Parker ITR Srl v Commission eleven corporations that manufactured marine hoses for offshore oil rigs were fined €131 million for rigging bids and sharing markets worldwide – they would designate a "bid champion" in each case to raise prices. Secret cartels are often hard to prove, so the courts allow competition regulators to establish collusion where there is no other plausible explanation for price rises. Some agreements among businesses, however, can be highly beneficial. For instance, in a decision on the Conseil Européen de la Construction d'Appareils Domestiques, the Commission held an agreement among washing machine makers to phase out production of low-efficiency machines was lawful, especially since it would lead to "reduced pollution from electricity generation". Fourth, TFEU article 106(1) requires that the state may not grant special or exclusive rights for undertakings that distort competition, and states that (2) competition law applies to services of general economic interest, unless it obstructs their tasks in law or fact (e.g. in providing public services). Under TFEU art 107(1) no state aid that distorts competition is allowed, but aid is allowed (2) for individual consumers, without discrimination, and (3) for economic development, particularly to tackle underemployment. The Procurement Directive 2014/24/EU, on government procurement in the EU sets standards for open tenders when outsourcing public services to private companies.

=== Commerce and intellectual property ===
While EU law has not yet developed a civil code for contracts, torts, unjust enrichment, real or personal property, or commerce in general, European legal scholars have drafted common principles, including Principles of European Contract Law and Principles of European Tort Law that are common to member states. In absence of harmonisation, there is a comprehensive system of conflicts of laws to settle the jurisdiction of courts, and the applicable law, for most commercial disputes. The Brussels I Regulation 2012 determines the jurisdiction of courts depending upon where a person is domiciled or has operations. The applicable law for consensual obligations is then determined by the Rome I Regulation, where article 3 states the principle that a choice of law can be made expressly in a contract, unless this affects provisions that cannot be derogated from, such as employment, consumer, tenancy or other rights. The Rome II Regulation determines applicable law in the case of non-consensual obligations, such as torts and unjust enrichment. Under article 4 the general rule is that the law applies where "the damage occurred", although under article 7 in the case of "environmental damage or damage sustained by persons or property as a result" there is a choice to bring an action under the law of the tortfeasor.

Unlike other property forms, intellectual property rights are comprehensively regulated by a series of directives on copyrights, patents and trademarks. The Copyright Term Directive 2006 article 1 states the principle that copyrights last for 70 years after the death of the author. The Copyright and Information Society Directive 2001 was passed to regulate copyright over the internet, and the effect of article 5 is that internet service providers are not liable for data they transmit even if it infringes copyright. However under article 6, member states must give "adequate legal protection" for copyrights. The Resale Rights Directive creates a right to royalties for authors where works are resold. The Enforcement Directive requires member states have effective remedies and legal processes. Under the European Patent Convention, which is separate from the EU, the general patent term is 20 years from the date that a patent (of an invention) is filed with an official register, and the development of an EU patent attempts to harmonise standards around these norms. The Trade Marks Directive enables a common system of trade mark registration so that, with exceptions, a registered trade mark applies across all EU member states.

== Public regulation ==
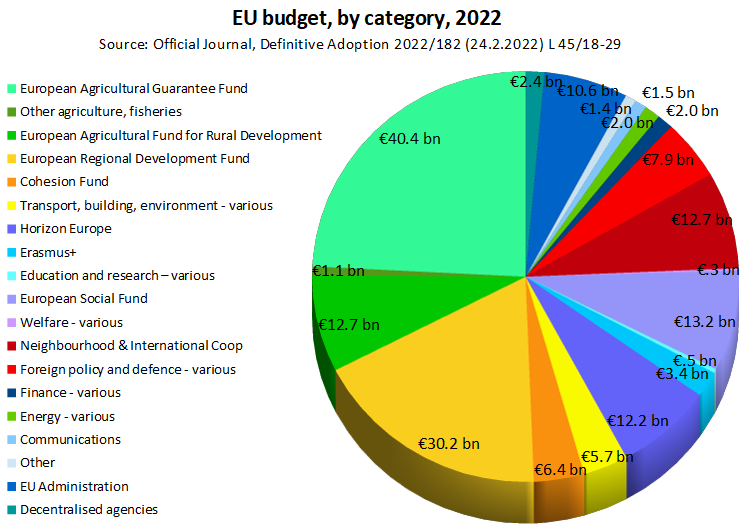
The EU's budget in 2022 was around €170bn. Of this, €54bn subsidised agriculture, €42bn was spent on transport, building and the environment, €16bn on education and research, €13bn on welfare, €20bn on foreign and defence policy, €2bn in finance, €2bn in energy, €1.5bn in communications, and €13bn in administration.

A major part of EU law, and most of the EU's budget, concerns public regulation of enterprise and public services. A basic norm of the Treaty on the Functioning of the EU, in article 345, is that the "Treaties shall in no way prejudice the rules in Member States governing the system of property ownership", meaning the EU remains neutral between private or public ownership, but that it can require common standards. In the cases of education and health, member states generally organise public services and the EU requires free movement. There is a unified European Central Bank that funds private banks, and adopts a common monetary policy for price stability, employment and sustainability. The EU's policies on energy, agriculture and forestry, transport and buildings are crucial to end climate damage and shift completely to clean energy that does not heat the planet. Among these, 33% of the entire EU budget is spent on agricultural subsidies to farm corporations and owners. The EU also has an increasing number of policies to raise standards for communications, the internet, data protection, and online media. It has limited involvement in the military and security, but a Common Foreign and Security Policy.

=== Education and health ===
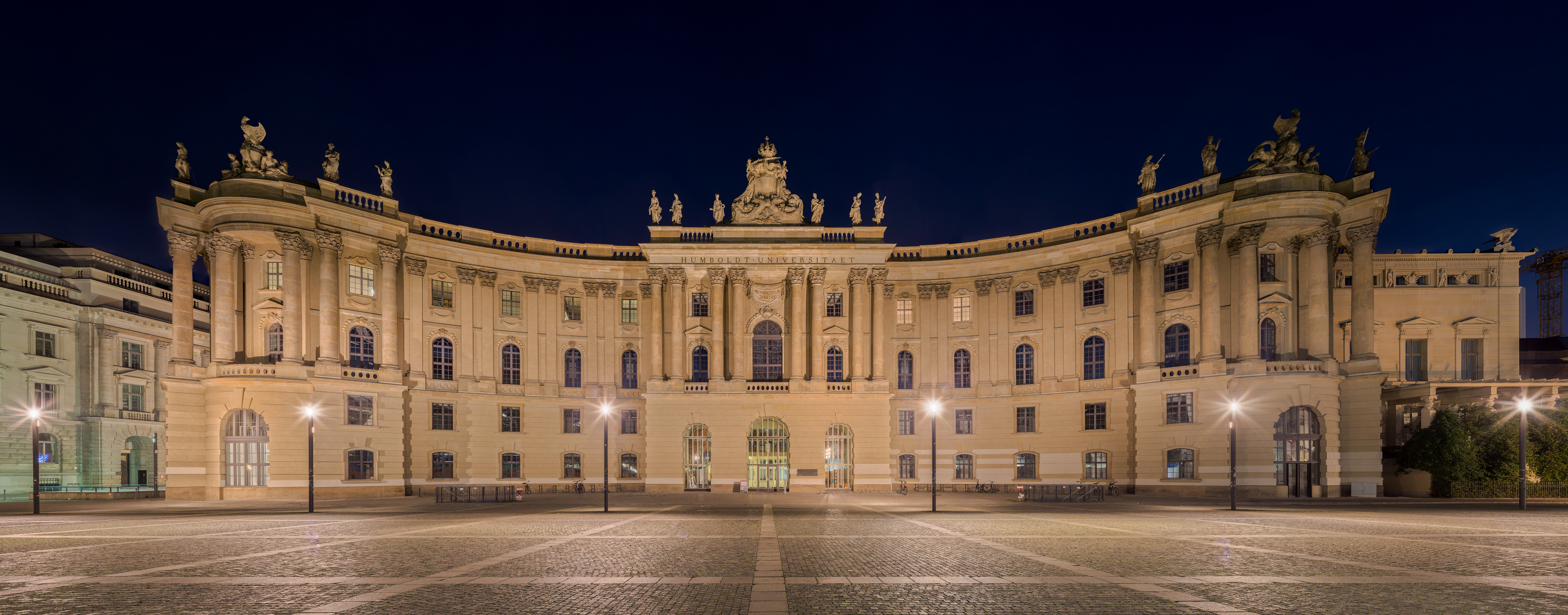
Most European universities, such as the University of Berlin, are tuition free and funded through fair tax, after the European Social Charter and International Bill of Rights, although their governance does not always give sufficient voting power to staff and alumni.

Education and health are provided mainly by member states, but shaped by common minimum standards in EU law. In the case of education, the European Social Charter, like the Universal Declaration, the International Bill of Human Rights, say that "everyone" has the right to education, and that primary, secondary and higher education should be made "free", for instance "by reducing or abolishing any fees or charges" and "granting financial assistance". While the history of education was confined to a wealth elite, today most member states have tuition free university. There are no common rules for university finance or governance, although there is a right to free movement and universities have voluntarily harmonised standards. In 1987, the Erasmus Programme was created to fund students to study in other countries, and with a budget of €30 billion from 2021 to 2027. From 1999, the Bologna Declaration and Process led to the creation of the European Higher Education Area where member state universities adopted a common degree structure (bachelor, master, and doctoral degree) with a goal to have similar expectations in learning outcomes. Member states may not impose different fees on students from other member states or limit their numbers, and this appears to have worked even without a system for countries to reimburse one another if costs differ widely. However, if member states have grants or student loans, R (Bidar) v London Borough of Ealing held there may be a minimum residency requirement, such as three years. Most of the world's best universities enable majority staff, and significant alumni or student voice in university governance. For instance, the French Education Code requires that universities have a board of management with 24 to 36 members, and 8 to 16 elected by professors, 4 to 6 by non-academic staff, 4 to 6 by students, and 8 external members, and have an academic council elected by staff with powers to set important rules, such as on training or examinations. Secondary, primary, and pre-school are generally free from fees. More successful school systems tend to be well-funded and public, and do not have barriers to children based on wealth, such as private fees for school. Most schools enable staff and parents to vote for representatives on their children's school governing bodies.

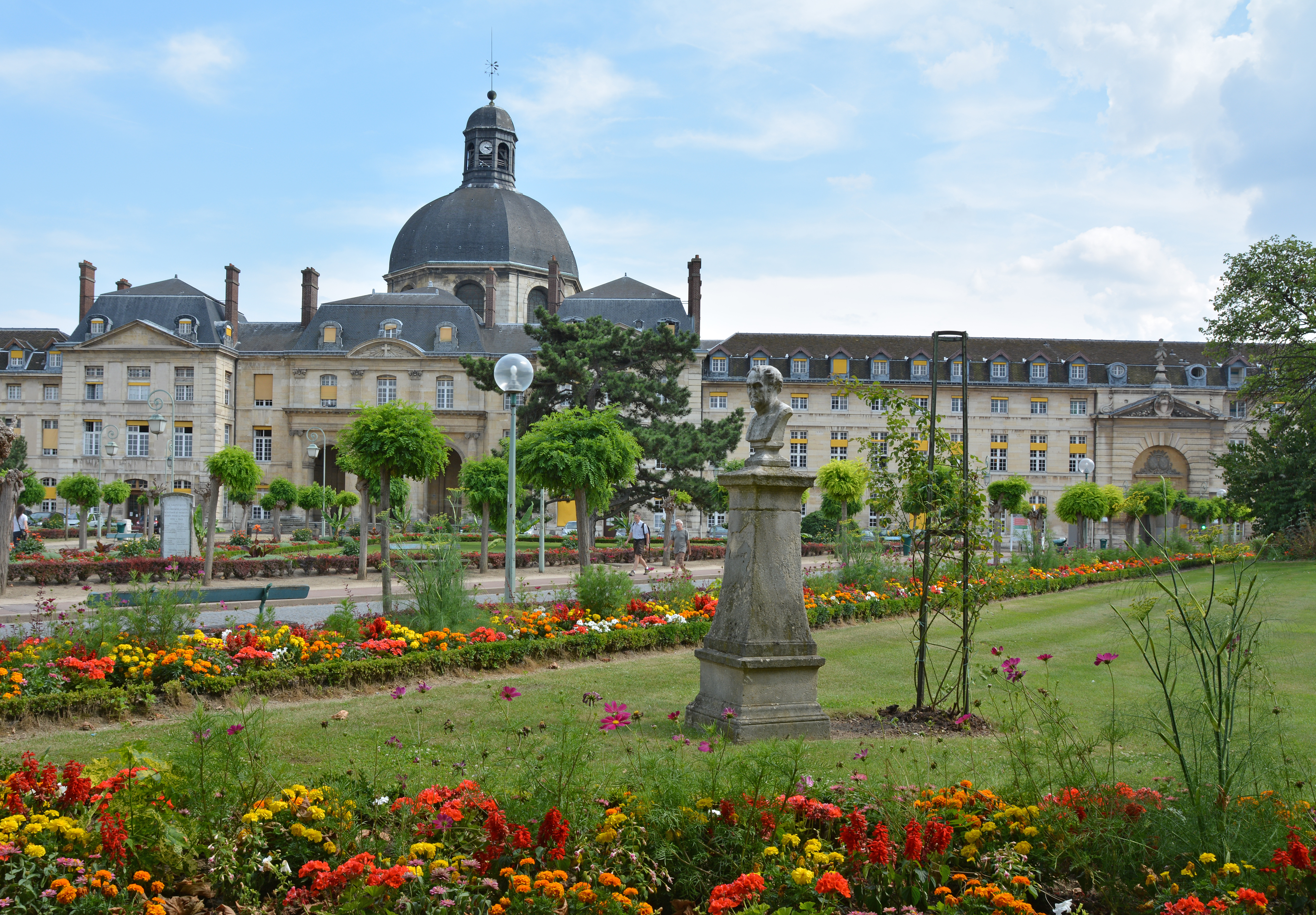
Most EU countries ensure healthcare is a free public service, or provide public insurance with hospitals operating independently such as at Pitié-Salpêtrière Hospital in Paris, while a minority have more costly private provision with worse outcomes.

As in education, there is a universal human right to 'health and well-being' including 'medical care and necessary social services', although human rights law does not say what the best system of health governance is. Among EU member states there are two main traditions of health care provision, based on public service or insurance. First, healthcare may be seen as a public service free at the point of use, with hospitals largely owned by the public health service and doctors publicly funded (the "Beveridge model".) This is the system, for example, in Finland, Sweden, Denmark, Spain, Italy, Portugal, Greece or Ireland. Second, healthcare can be provided through insurance, where hospitals and doctors are separately owned and run from the service provider (the "Bismarck model"). There is a large spectrum between systems based mainly on public insurance and usually creating public option hospitals or requiring no profit (such as France, Belgium, Luxembourg, Slovenia, the Czech Republic or Estonia) and those that allow substantial private and profit-making insurance and hospital or doctor provision (the Netherlands and Germany). In all cases, health is universal, and subsidised or free wherever people cannot afford insurance premiums. The healthcare outcomes vary greatly between different systems, so that while there is generally higher life expectancy with more investment, healthcare tends to have worse outcomes and costs more where there is more private business or profit. Under the Treaty on the Functioning of the European Union article 56 there is the right to receive services, with rules codified into the Patients' Rights Directive 2011. Article 4 requires that people are treated, article 5 requires reimbursement of costs by the person's country of origin, article 6 requires national contact points to connect healthcare providers or insurers and patient organisations, but under article 8 member states may require prior authorisation for people to travel abroad for treatment where the costs are high or planning is needed. A European Health Insurance Card is also available for free to receive health across the EU. This system was developed after R (Watts) v Bedford Primary Care Trust, where in 2003 Mrs Watts travelled from the UK to France, paid £3900 for a hip replacement operation, and claimed she should be reimbursed. The UK's National Health Service waiting lists were 4 to 6 months at the time. The Court of Justice's Grand Chamber held that health care counted as a 'service' under TFEU article 56, and that in principle there was a right to receive those services abroad. However, high demand could justify waiting lists in a national health system, but individual circumstances of the patient had to be assessed. For non-EU nationals, the European Court of Human Rights held in N v United Kingdom that it was not inhuman and degrading treatment contrary to ECHR article 3 to deport someone to a country where there were unlikely to live longer than two years without treatment. There is no duty 'through provision of free and unlimited health care to all aliens without a right to stay within its jurisdiction' to avoid 'too great a burden on the Contracting States.' However, if someone's death would be imminent the European Court of Human Rights has held that a decision to remove would violate ECHR article 3.

=== Banking, monetary and fiscal policy ===
Banking, monetary and fiscal policy is overseen by the European Central Bank, member states, and the EU Commission. This is vital for European society as it affects the human rights to full employment, to fair wages, housing, and to an adequate standard of living. When the Eurozone and common currency of the euro was established, there was no political agreement to develop a full EU fiscal policy (i.e. tax and spending), so that governments would pool money and lend to countries in trouble, because it was thought that wealthier member states should not have to subsidise poorer member states. However, there was planned to be a common central bank, which would aim to have common interest rates. The ECB, based in Frankfurt, controls monetary policy that underpins the euro. Member states also have central banks (such as the Bundesbank, Banque de France, Banco de España), and these 19 Eurozone member state central banks have a duty to act compatibly with ECB policy. The ECB has an executive board with a president, vice president and four other members, all appointed by the European Council by qualified majority, after consulting the European Parliament, and the Governing Council of the ECB. The Governing Council is made up of the ECB executive board and member state central banks using the euro, they have 8 year terms, and can be removed only for gross misconduct.

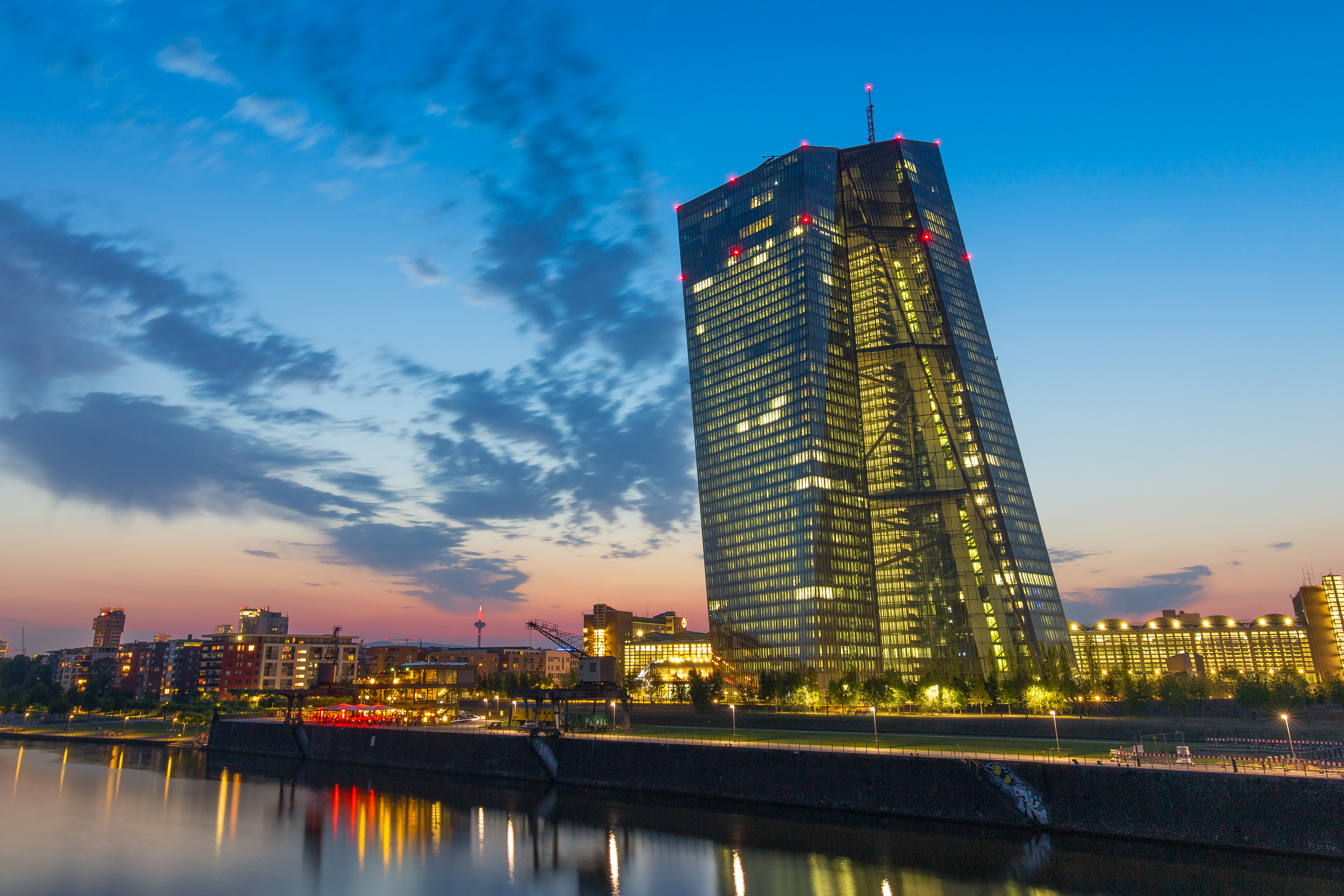
The European Central Bank is meant to maintain "price stability" and full employment, but it has not yet used its monetary policy powers to make banks divest from the fossil fuels that cause inflation, to prevent escalating wage inequality, or escalating housing prices.

The European Central Bank's 'primary objective... shall be to maintain price stability. Without prejudice to that objective, it shall support the general economic policies in the Union', such as 'balanced economic growth and price stability, a highly competitive social market economy, aiming at full employment and social progress, and a high level of protection and improvement of the quality of the environment.' There are three main powers to achieve these goals. First, the ECB can require other banks to hold reserves proportionate to their type of lending. Second, it may lend money to other banks, or conduct 'credit operations'. Third it may 'operate in the financial markets by buying and selling' securities. For example, in Gauweiler v Deutscher Bundestag a German politician claimed that the ECB's purchase of Greek government debt on secondary markets violated TFEU article 123, which prohibits directly lending money to member state governments. The Court of Justice rejected that the ECB had engaged in 'economic policy' (i.e. fiscal transfers) rather than monetary policy decisions, which it was allowed to do. So far the ECB has failed to use these powers to eliminate investment in fossil fuels, despite the inflation that gas, oil and coal cause given their price volality in international markets.

Beyond the central bank, the Credit Institutions Directive 2013 requires authorisation and prudence provisions in other banks in all EU member states. Under the Basel III programme, created by an international banker group, banks must hold more money in reserves based on the risk-profile that it holds, as determined by the member state regulator. More risky assets require more reserves, and the Capital Requirements Regulation 2013 codifies these standards, for instance by mandating that proportionally less in reserves is needed if more government debt is held, but more if mortgage-backed securities are held. To guard against the risk of bank runs, the Deposit Guarantee Directive 2014 creates an EU wide minimum guarantee of €100,000 for bank deposits, so that if anyone's bank goes insolvent, the state will pay the deposit up to this amount. There are not yet rules requiring higher reserving and accounting practices for climate risk and of gas, oil or coal reserves become worthless as Europe replaces fossil fuels with renewable energy.

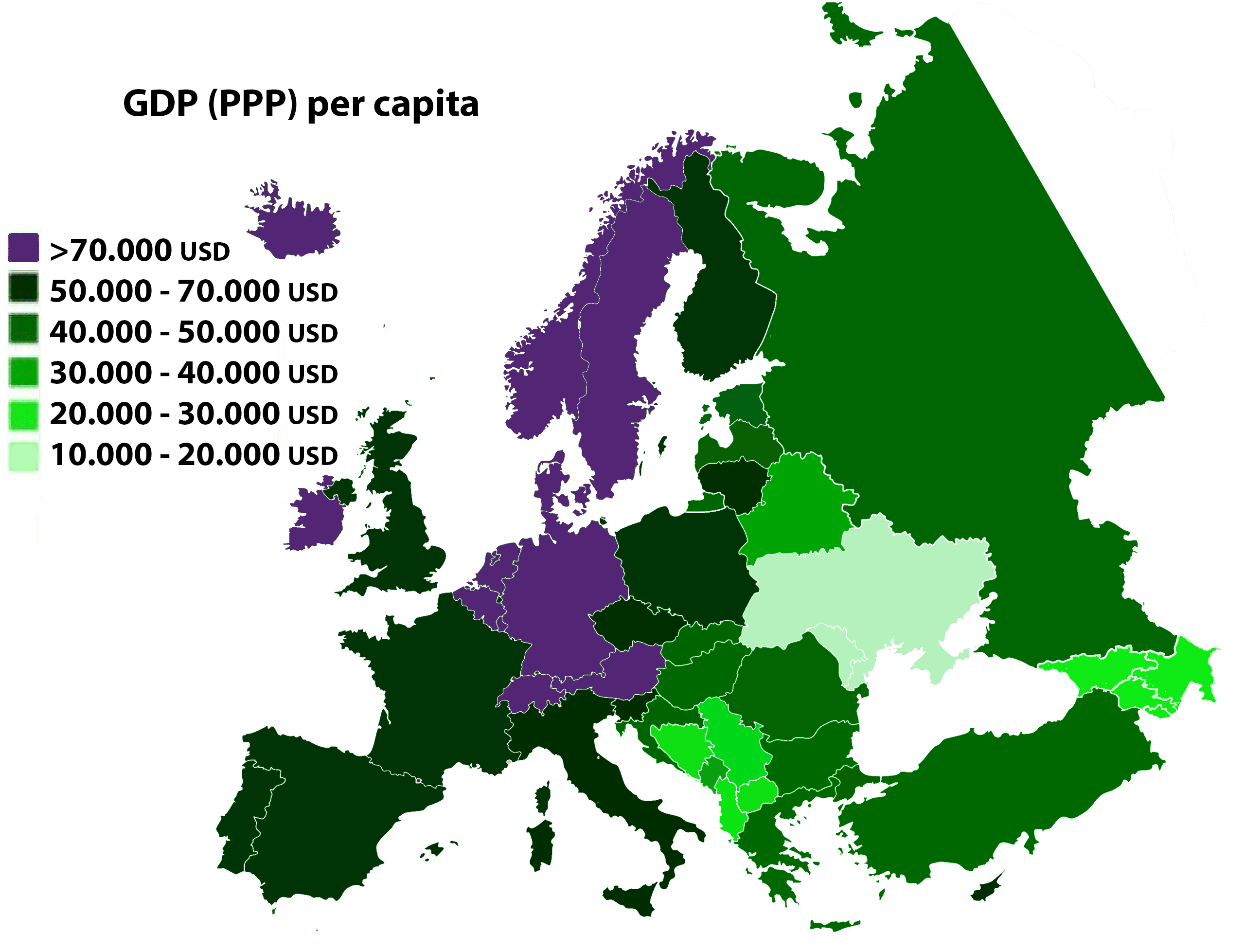
European nations by GDP (PPP) per capita in 2019. The EU has not yet updated its GDP measures to discount for harmful goods and services that create greenhouse gas emissions, pollution or ill health.

The budget of the European Union is set in 7 year cycles, and in 2022 around €170bn was spent, of which nearly one-third was agricultural policy, including regional development. EU member state government expenditures are far higher as a proportion of Gross Domestic Product, but are constrained by the Fiscal Compact, which requires no more than a 3% budget deficit compared to GDP in any given year, and aiming for surpluses or balanced budgets. As a result of the Eurozone crisis, a Treaty establishing the European Stability Mechanism created a fund to assist countries with severe fiscal problems. The results of the "strict conditionality" attached to loans (or so called structural adjustment) that required privatisation, cuts to welfare, and wages in Greece, Spain, Portugal or Ireland was particularly negative. The EU's main metric for economic performance has been GDP, which adds up market exchange values in firm accounts and government expenditures according to the Gross National Income Regulation 2019, even though this fails to discount polluting and harmful economic activities such as energy and industry that damages the climate, the environment and human health. The EU's budget mainly comes from contributions of around 0.7% of GDP per member state, as well as a share of EU value added tax and customs duties. The EU does not yet have a more comprehensive system for preventing tax evasion, or for fair taxation of multinational or financial corporations.

=== Electricity and energy ===
Like the world, the EU's greatest task is to replace fossil fuels with clean energy as fast as technology allows since protection of "life", and "improvement of the quality of the environment" are fundamental rights, and the highest policy goals of the EU. In international law, there is also 'the inherent right of all peoples to enjoy and utilize fully and freely their natural wealth and resources' such as clean air, and the right to 'the benefits of scientific progress', such as clean energy. The EU's overall target is to reduce toxic greenhouse gas emissions by 50–55% by 2030, and be carbon neutral or negative by 2050, and 32% renewable energy by 2030, though a 45% target by 2030 was proposed by the commission and backed by Parliament in 2022. Since the 2022 Russian invasion of Ukraine it aims to eliminate Russian fossil fuel imports as fast as possible. However laws such as the Hydrocarbons Directive 1994 still enable gas and oil extraction. It requires that licences are awarded based on technical and financial capability, methods, price, and previous conduct, that applicants are treated equally by objective and non-discriminatory criteria, and advertisements for tenders must be public. It has not yet required that existing licensees pay for the pollution and climate damage they have caused, nor sought to end extraction of gas and oil.

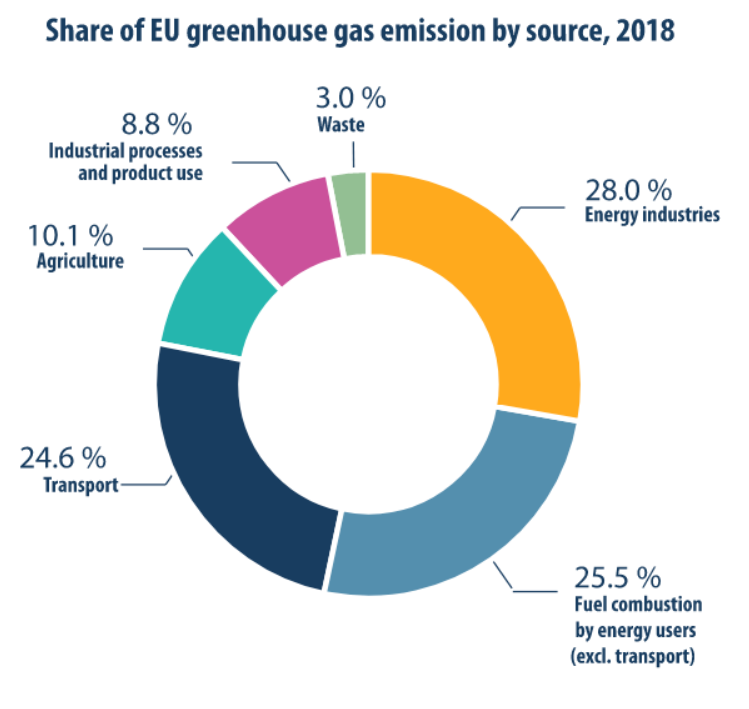
The EU's greenhouse gas emissions are 90% from (1) energy generation from gas, oil and coal, (2) buildings with gas heating, (3) transport using oil, and (4) agriculture. By 2023, clean energy was cheaper from wind, solar or hydro, but EU law has not yet required rapid clean technology adoption.

A growing number of cases seek to enforce liability on gas, oil and coal polluters. In Friends of the Earth v Royal Dutch Shell plc, the Hague District Court held that Shell was bound by the tort provisions of the Dutch Civil Code, Book 6, section 162(2), interpreted in light of the Paris Agreement 2015 article 2(1) and ECHR articles 2 and 8 (rights to life and home), to immediately start cutting all of its emissions by 45% by 2030, whether generated directly by its corporate group (scope 1), indirectly from its purchases (scope 2), or indirectly from its value chain or the purchase and use of its products (scope 3). It emphasised the 'serious and irreversible consequences of dangerous climate change in the Netherlands... pose a threat to the human rights of Dutch residents'. After this loss, Shell dropped "Royal Dutch" from its name, and moved its headquarters to London. In Lliuya v RWE AG Mr Lliuya, who lives in Huaraz, Peru has claimed that RWE AG should pay 0.47% of the costs of flood defences against a melting mountain glacier that increases the size of Lake Palcacocha, because RWE is responsible for 0.47% of historic global greenhouse gas emissions. The Higher Regional Court of Essen gave leave to appeal on whether there is causation of damage, and in 2022 visited the lake. There has also been heightened responsibility on member state governments. In Urgenda v State of Netherlands the Dutch Supreme Court held the Dutch government must reduce greenhouse gas emissions by 25% before 2020, following the IPCC 2007 minimum recommendations, and that failure to do so would violate the right to life and home in ECHR articles 2 and 8. In the Klimaschutz case, the German Constitutional Court held that the German government must speed up its climate protection measures to protect the rights to life, and the environment under the Grundgesetz 1949, articles 2 and 20a. However the EU and member states have so far failed to codify liability to prevent pollution and climate damage by corporations that profit, and the EU Emissions Trading System has failed to adequately price carbon for the damage it causes (prices traded under €98 per metric ton until the end of 2022).

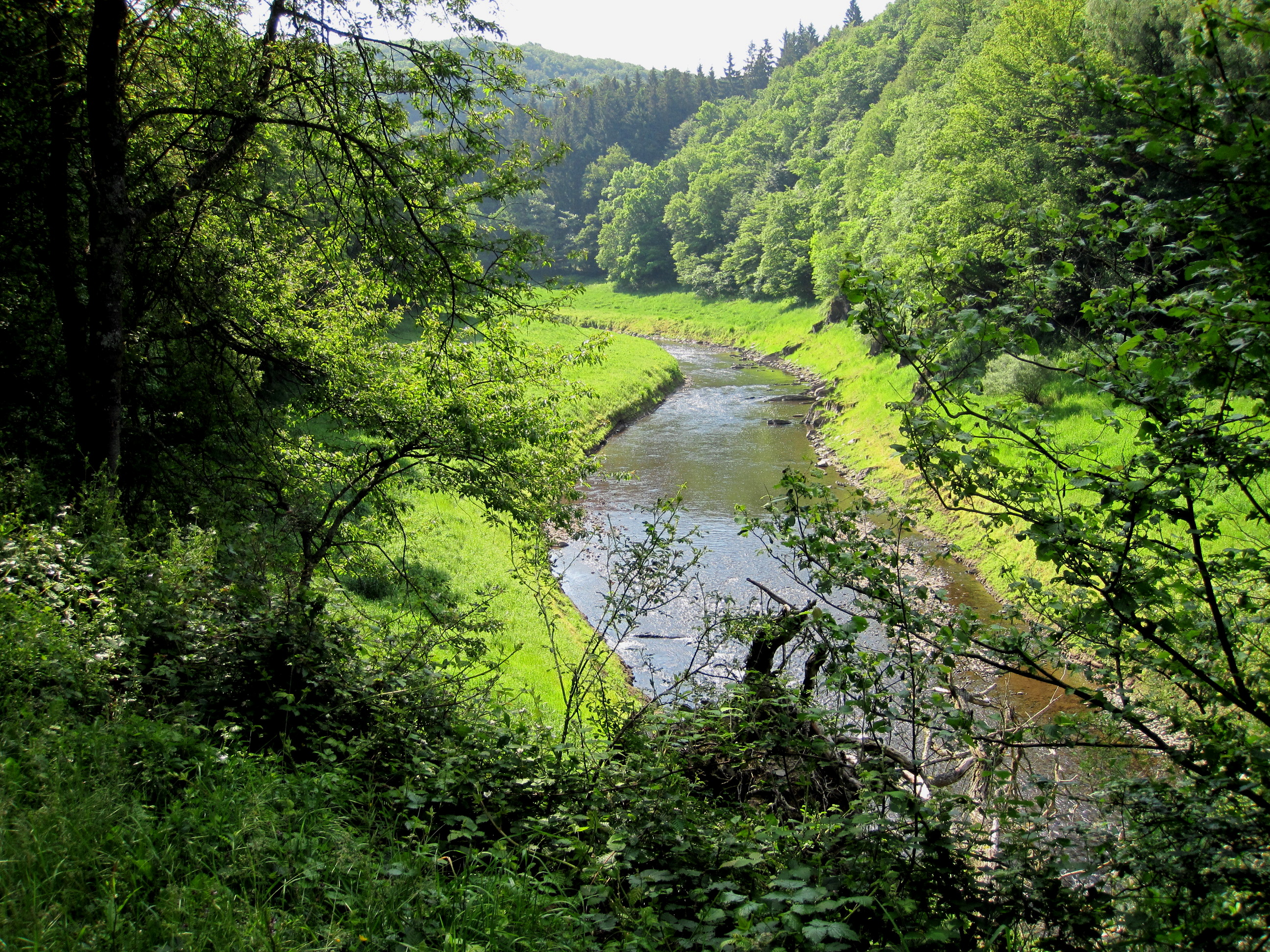
Deforestation in Europe has been driven by "biomass" being classified as "renewable", even though burning wood for power pollutes the air and harms human health more than coal, and drives climate damage.

As clean energy from wind, solar or hydro storage replaces pollution from gas, oil and coal, EU law has standards for generation and distribution networks. First, in generation, the Renewable Energy Directive 2018 still enables biomass and biofuel to count toward "renewable" energy statistics based on the argument that trees or plants absorb greenhouse gases when they grow, even though biomass burning (usually in ex-coal plants) releases more greenhouse gases than coal, biomass transport is not clean, forests take decades to replenish, and smoke damages human health. Second, the EU does not yet have a feed-in tariff system, requiring energy grids and retailers to pay a fair price to households or businesses with solar or wind generation, however in PreussenElektra AG v Schleswag AG the Court of Justice held that member states could fix any price they chose, so that energy companies would have to reimburse producers for the energy they received. A company now owned by E.ON claimed the feed-in tariff was state aid under TFEU article 107, and should have to pass rules for exemption, as a way to hinder renewable energy funding. The Court rejected this, because although the policy might have 'negative repercussions' for big energy companies it 'cannot be regarded' as giving to small producers 'a particular advantage at the expense of the state'.

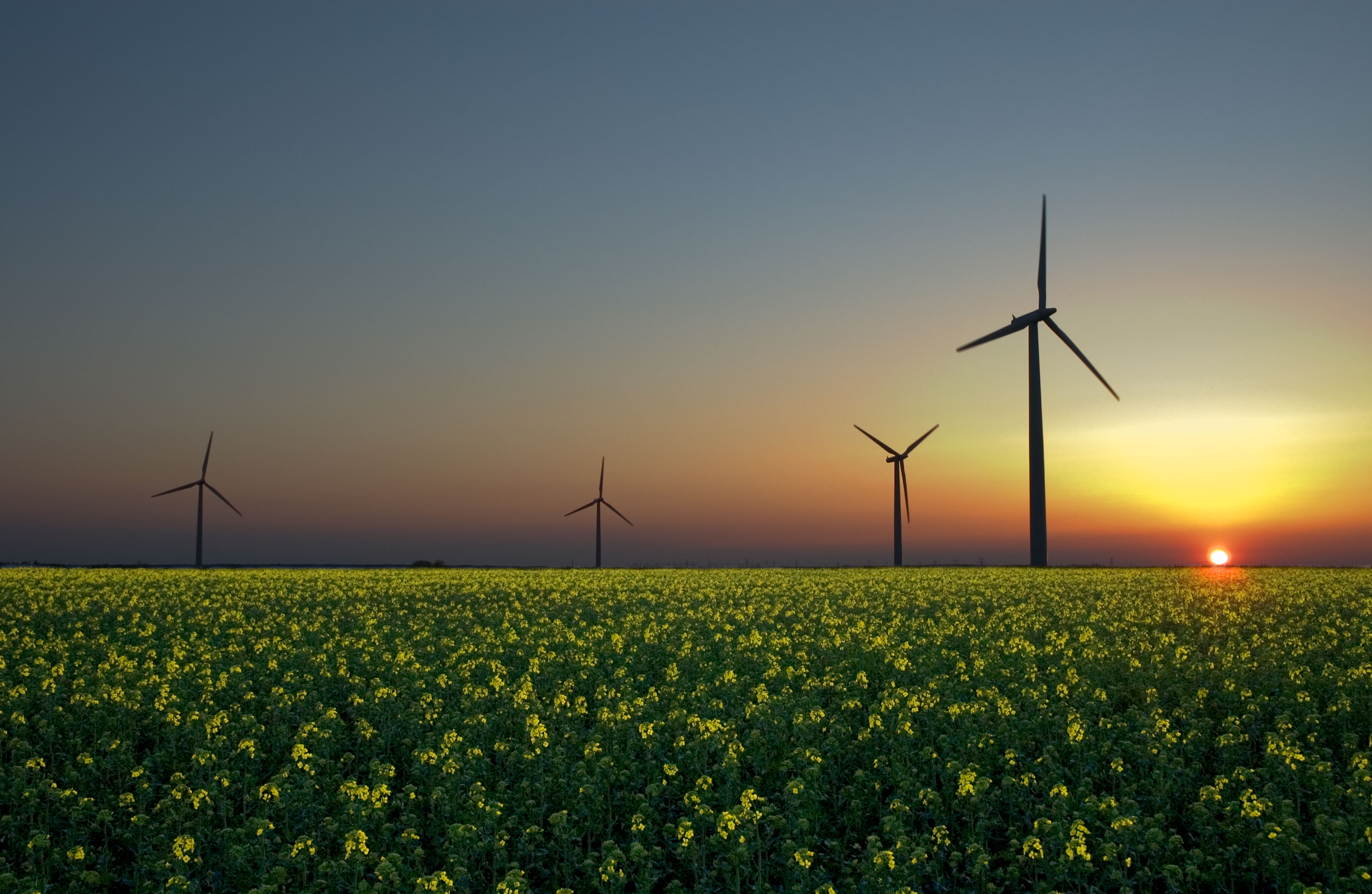
The EU's wind, solar and hydro sectors remain a minority, but growing share of energy. It has not yet given a deadline to shut down all gas, oil and coal, although some member states have required fossil fuel companies to convert, such as Denmark's Ørsted.

The third main set of standards is that the EU requires that electricity or gas enterprises acquire a licence from member state authorities. There must be legal separation into different entities of owners of networks from retailers, although they can be owned by the same enterprise, to ensure transparency of accounting. Then, different enterprises have rights to access infrastructure of network owners on fair and transparent terms, as a way to ensure different member state networks and supplies can become integrated across the EU. Most EU operators are publicly owned, and the Court of Justice in Netherlands v Essent NV emphatically rejected that there was any violation of EU law on free movement of capital by a Dutch Act requiring electricity and gas distributors to be publicly owned, that system operators could not be connected by ownership to generators, and limited the level of debt. The Court of Justice held a public ownership requirement was justified by 'overriding reasons in the public interest', 'to protect consumers' and for the 'security of energy supply'. It further pointed to the foundational case of Costa v ENEL, where the Court held in 1964 that the treaties do 'not prohibit the creation of any state monopolies' so long as they do not operate commercially and discriminate. The approach of EU law is that even where energy companies are privatised, they still are subject to the same rules as the state on direct effect, because it remains that they are 'providing a public service'. The evidence suggests "consumers pay lower electricity net-of-tax prices in countries where there are still incumbents owned by national governments." With the sharp rise in fossil fuel prices that came from the 2022 Russian invasion of Ukraine and the fossil fuel cartel OPEC deciding to restrict supply, the EU Commission proposed a windfall fossil fuel tax. There are not yet common standards on energy enterprise governance, although a number of member states ensure that workers and energy bill payers have the right to vote for directors.

=== Agriculture, forestry and water ===
Everyone has the right to food and water, and under the Charter of Fundamental Rights of the EU "the improvement of the quality of the environment must be integrated into the policies of the Union". The Common Agricultural Policy's origins lay in ensuring that all farm workers had fair wages and everyone had food, since in 1960 a third of employment and a fifth of GDP was in agriculture, and after WW2 Europe had been on the brink of starvation. In 2020, the agricultural workforce was 4.2% of the EU total. The CAP's objectives are still to increase production, "a fair standard of living for the agricultural community", to stabilise markets and supplies, and "reasonable prices" for consumers. In 2021, the CAP was 33.1% of the entire EU budget, at €55.1 billion, however there are no requirements for subsidies to be used so that farm workers (as opposed to owners) have fair pay scales, few requirements for rural development, and minimal standards for environmental improvement.

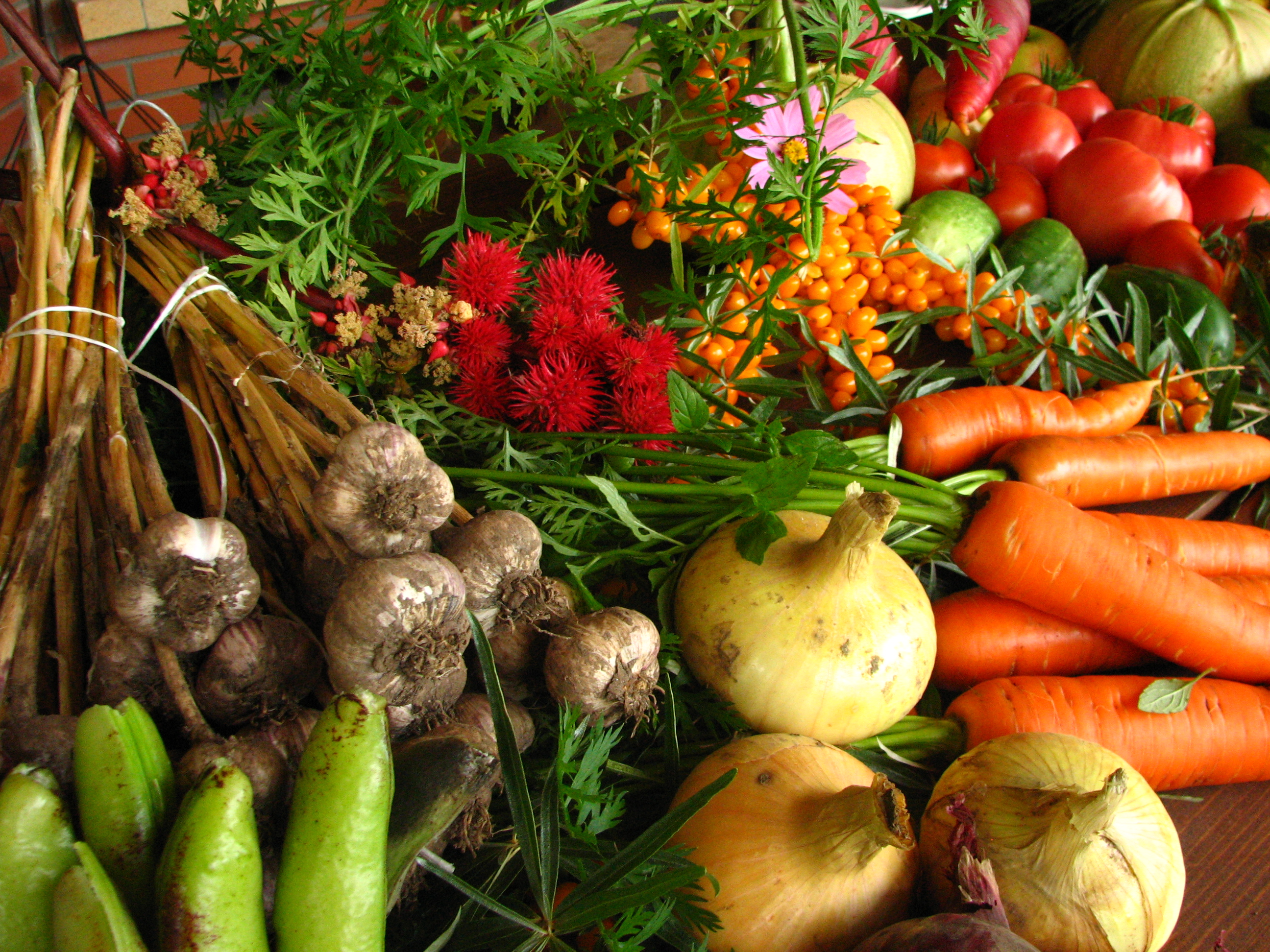
The Common Agricultural Policy is 33% of the EU budget, but does not yet require fair wages for farm workers, that production stops using fossil fuels, or that reforestation and rewilding takes place.

The CAP has three main parts. First, the European Agricultural Guarantee Fund distributes 'direct payments', which are 70.9% of the CAP budget. The Direct Payments Regulation 2013 gives payments to an 'active farmer' that carries out agricultural activity, grazing or cultivation, does not operate airports, rail, waterworks, real estate, sport or recreation grounds, and has the land at their disposal. The farm must have at least 1 hectare and receive €100 for each, though member states can set higher thresholds (e.g. 5 hectares and €200). If payments reach over €150,000 there is a 5% reduction per hectare for each hectare. This favours large farm corporations, and the largest 1% typically receive around 10 to 15% of all subsidies in member states. As conditions of receiving subsidies, farms can be required to keep land in good condition, for public, animal, and plant health, and maintain environment standards. For minimal biodiversity, farmers must have over two crops if they have 10 hectares, not farm at least 5% of lintensively (an 'ecological focus area' over 15 hectares, and have three crops over 30 hectares. Environmentally sensitive grasslands, as designated by the Habitats Directive 1992 and the Wild Birds Directive 2009, should not be more turned into more than 5% agricultural area. The second main part, also carried out by the EAGF, is 'market measures'. Under the Agricultural Products Regulation 2013 certain crops and meat are eligible for purchase by member state authorities, to be 'stored by them until disposed of', with extra aid for storage. The goal of this is to restrict supply and therefore raise prices, particularly in response to unexpected drops in demand, a health scare, or international market volatility. In 2018, this was 4.59% of the CAP budget. The benefits of many of these subsidies go to the parties in the food supply chains with most bargaining power, which is usually supermarkets. The Agricultural Unfair Trading Practices Directive 2019 article 3 prohibits practices such as late payments by buyers of food to suppliers, cancellations at short notice, unilateral alteration of terms, threats of commercial retaliation, and payments by suppliers to the buyers (i.e. from farmers to supermarkets) for stocking, adverts, marketing or staff. These rules limit supermarkets' abuse of a dominant position but do not ensure subsidies reach farm communities. The Food Safety Regulation 2002 article 14 requires that food is not place on the market if it is 'injurious to health' or is 'unfit for human consumption', but there is no requirement that supermarkets or others eliminate harmful packaging such as plastic. The third main part, administered by the European Agricultural Fund for Rural Development, is 'rural development' payments, which are 24.4% of the CAP budget. Following the 'Europe 2020 Strategy by promoting sustainable rural development', payments are made for knowledge transfer, advice, asset investment, and business development aid. Priorities may include improving water and energy use. The courts give the EU a wide discretion to implement policy, so judicial review is possible only if agricultural measures are 'manifestly inappropriate'. EU law does not yet have a systematic plan or subsidies to rewild depleted environments, and to move to complete clean energy infrastructure.

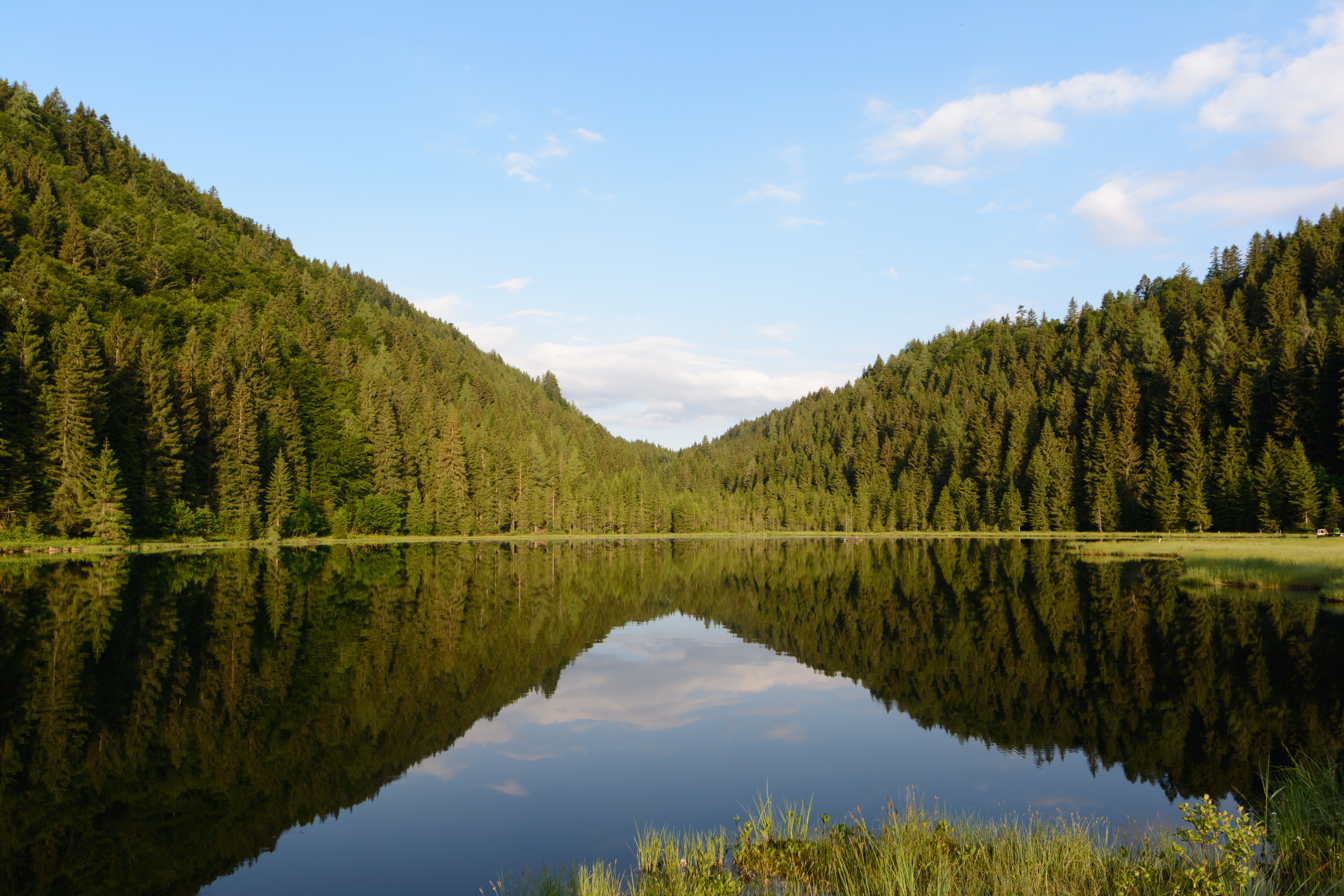
Forests, like the Wörschachwald in Austria, once covered 80% of Europe, but now cover only 43.5% of EU land. There is no plan yet to reforest and rewild the continent in the agriculture budget.

Outside farms, forests cover just 43.52% of the EU's land, compared to 80% forest cover historically across Europe. There is no requirement yet to undertake any reforesting or rewilding of land, while the Land Use and Forestry Directive 2018 merely requires that member states keep accounts of land use and forestry changes based on greenhouse gas emissions, and that emissions do not exceed removals of greenhouse gases. Globally, the Timber Regulation 2010 requires that all timber traders know their supply chains and keep records for 5 years, to ensure that any illegally harvested timber is banned in the EU law, however there is not yet any ban on imports of goods (such as beef or palm oil) from countries that continue to deforest their landscape. For water resources, in nature or for drinking, the Water Framework Directive 2000 sets common standards and provides that member states should oversee water industry standards. The Drinking Water Quality Directive 2020 requires water that is "wholesome and clean", and article 4 defines this as free from micro-organisms and parasites dangerous to health, and compliant with chemical and biological standards in Annex I. The Bathing Waters Directive 2006 sets standards for quality of bathing waters, namely riviers and beaches, to be free from toxic waste or sewage. There must be adequate remedies for breaches, so in Commission v United Kingdom (1992) it was held that the UK's approach of accepting undertakings from water companies to behave better in future, instead of using enforcement orders, was inadequate to comply with EU law. Fines can be and often are significant, ranging into hundreds of thousands or millions of euros for breach.

=== Transport and buildings ===
Clean road, rail, sea and air transport are fundamental goals of the EU, given its commitment to human rights for 'improvement of the quality of the environment', 'services of general economic interest', and the right to 'the benefits of scientific progress'. However, the pace of reform is slow compared to the urgency of reversing global heating. The Renewable Energy Directive 2018 article 25 requires that final energy consumption in transport in each member state is 'at least 14%' renewable by 2030. This is within the 2030 target for 32% "share of energy from renewable sources in the Union's gross final consumption of energy". In 2022, the EU promised to ban sale of new petrol and diesel vehicles only by 2035, enabling manufacturing corporations to profit from toxic emissions for another 13 years, though many member states have higher standards. There is not yet a plan for full rail electrification, or clean shipping or air travel, even where technology exists.

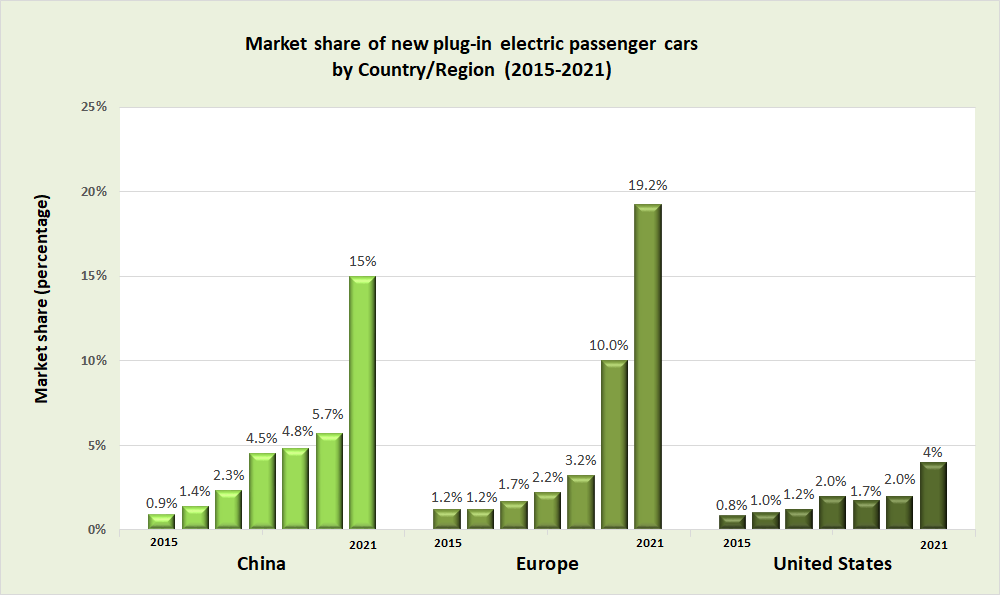
The market share of plug-in electric vehicles in Europe was 19% in 2021. In the Dieselgate scandal, firms such as Volkswagen, Fiat, BMW and Renault engaged in mass fraud to conceal toxic emissions, leading to thousands of deaths.

In road transport, the Emission Performance Regulation 2019 says manufacturers of "new passenger cars" should not allow emissions to exceed 95 grams of CO_{2} per kilometre, and 147 grams of CO_{2} per kilometre for new light commercial vehicles, but this is merely an "EU fleet-wide target" rather than requirements for each vehicle. Manufacturers can agree to pool their production quotas, so as to meet their targets on average, but there is no legal sanction for failure to meet the target. Member states are simply required to record the relevant success or failure, and manufacturers' performance is published. By contrast the Vehicles Emissions Regulation 2007 sets the "Euro 6" standards in maximum emissions that car manufacturers can have. Since the 'Euro 1' standard was introduced in 1992, standards became cleaner each 4 to 5 years, but recently stalled. Article 2 states this applies to vehicles under 2,610 kilograms, while the Heavy Vehicle Emission Regulation 2019 applies to heavier vehicles, with looser CO_{2} limits. Article 4 states manufacturers must 'demonstrate that all new vehicles sold, registered or put into service in the Community are type approved in accordance with this Regulation'. Article 6 requires manufacturers to 'provide unrestricted and standardised access to vehicle repair and maintenance information' should there be any non-compliance. Article 13 requires penalties imposed by member states for breach are 'effective, proportionate and dissuasive', and breaches include any 'false declarations' as well as 'use of defeat devices'. This reference follows the "Dieselgate" scandal where Volkswagen and manufacturers around Europe and the world fraudulently concealed their true emissions. In 2007, Commission v Germany held that the German Volkswagen Act 1959 violated free movement of capital in TFEU article 63 by ensuring that the state of Lower Saxony had a golden share to exercise public control over the company's governance. It limited voting rights of individual shareholder to 20% of the company. The German government's justification that the restrictions were an overriding public interest, for instance, to protect workers was rejected. A justification for environmental protection was not offered. After this, the Porsche family dominated Volkswagen, and in 2007 a new CEO, Martin Winterkorn took up his post and aimed in 'Strategie 2018' to become the world's largest auto-manufacturer, and it began to install cheat devices.

High-speed rail in Europe is coordinated by the commission, and has a patchwork plan to gradually upgrade track for a faster network.

People need to have a driving licence to drive on a road, and there is a common system of recognition around the EU. For delivery vehicle workers, the Road Transport Regulation 2006 limits daily driving time to 9 hours a day, a maximum of 56 hours a week, and requires at least a 45-minute break after 4 1/2 hours. Drivers may also not be paid according to distance travelled if this would endanger road safety. Taxi enterprises are usually regulated separately in each member state, and the attempts of the app-based firm Uber to evade regulation by arguing it was not a "transport service" rather than an "Information Society Service" failed. Most bus networks are publicly owned or procured, but there are common rights. If buses are delayed in journeys over 250 kilometres, the Bus Passenger Rights Regulation 2011 entitles passengers to compensation. Under article 19, a delay over two hours must result in compensation of 50% of the ticket price, as well as rerouting and reimbursement. Article 6 says 'Carriers may offer contract conditions that are more favourable for the passenger', although it is not clear many take up this option. Article 7 says member states cannot set maximum compensation for death or injury lower than €220,000 per passenger or €1200 per item of luggage. There is not yet a requirement for the major bus, delivery, taxi enterprises to electrify their fleets even though this would create the fastest reduction of emissions and would be cheaper for business in total operating costs.

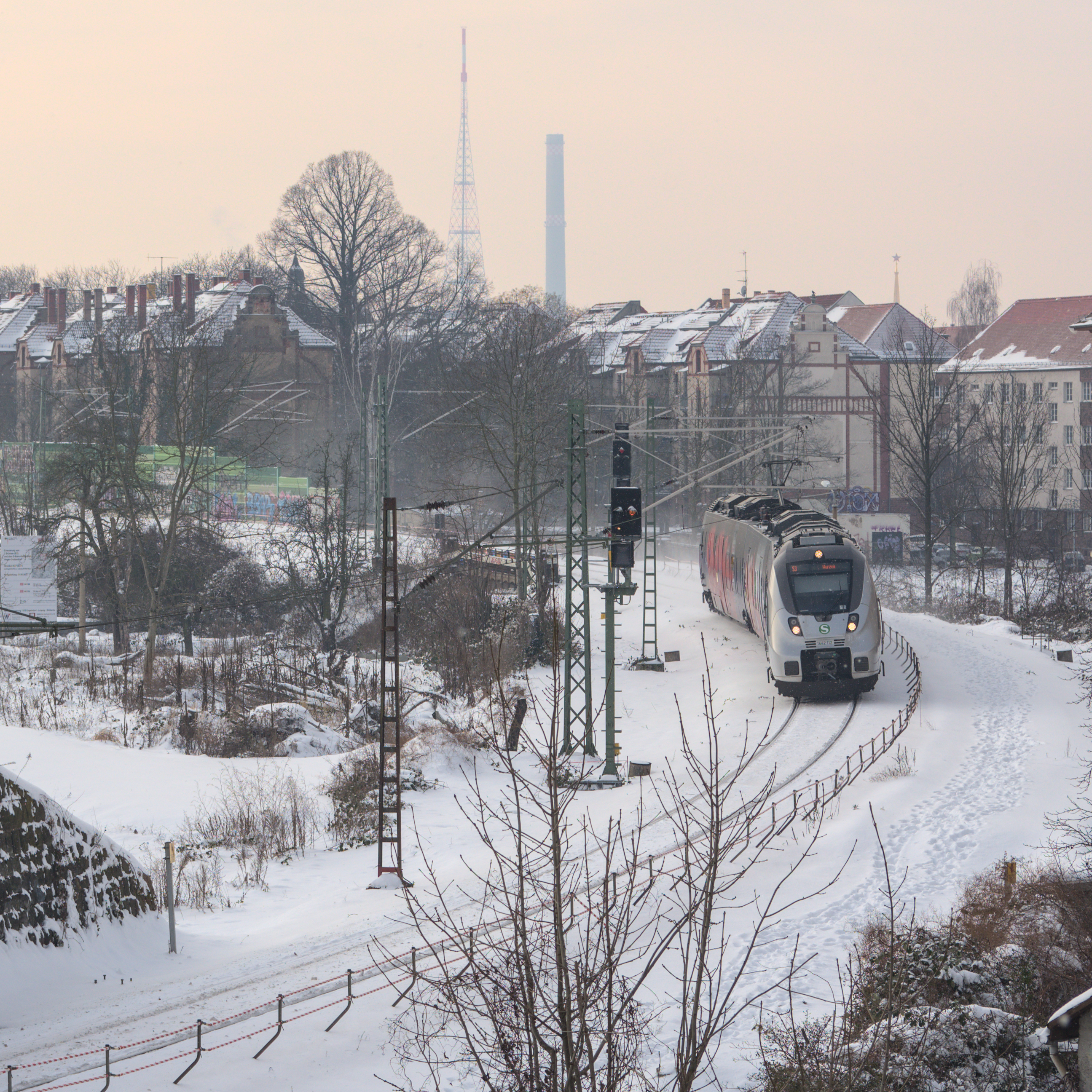
Transport and buildings are the EU's two greatest internal sources of fossil fuel use, but there is no legislative end to gas heating or end to polluting motors until 2035, or 2030 in some member states.

In rail transport, the Single European Railway Directive 2012 requires that ownership of tracks and operating companies are separated to prevent conflicts of interest and pricing, particularly to ensure that trains can run from one member state to another. Most European railways are publicly owned, and each train enterprise must have separate accounts and member states should run railways 'at the lowest possible cost for the quality of service required'. The Rail Passenger Rights Regulation 2007 article 17 states that 25% of a ticket price should be refunded if there is a one-hour delay, and 50% over two hours, with a threshold of €4 to claim. Passengers have a right to take bicycles on trains where they are not overcrowded, there must be clear information on tickets, and there are rights to make reservations. Finally, in air transport, under the Flight Compensation Regulation (EC) No 261/2004 there is a minimum right of €250 compensation for 2 hour delay on 1500 km flight, €400 compensation for 3 hour delay or more on a 1500–3500 km flight, and €600 for 4 hours in flights over 3500 km flight, plus the right to refreshments, hotels, and alternative transport. There are not yet duties on airline companies to invest in research for clean fuels, and eliminate unnecessary flight paths when clean land transport alternatives (such as high-speed rail) exist.

Finally, the 'right to housing assistance' is a basic part of EU law. House prices are affected by monetary policy (above), but otherwise the EU's involvement is so far limited to minimal environmental standards. The Energy Performance of Buildings Directive 2010 aims to eliminate unclean materials and energy waste to have "nearly zero-energy buildings", particularly by setting standards for new buildings since 2020 and upgrading existing buildings by 2050. There is, however, no requirement yet that all buildings replace gas heating with electric or heat-pumps, have solar or wind energy generation, electric vehicle charging, and particular insulation standards, wherever possible.

=== Communications and data ===
The right 'to seek, receive and impart information and ideas of all kinds, regardless of frontiers' is a basic part of freedom of expression, as much as the right against 'arbitrary or unlawful interference with [our] privacy, family, home or correspondence', whether interference is by business, government or anyone else. Communication networks, from the post to telephone lines to the internet, are crucial for friends, families, business and government, and EU law sets standards for their construction and use. For example, the Postal Services Directive 1997 article 3 requires 'universal service' at minimum standards by the main postal provider. For mobile phone access anywhere in the EU, the Roaming Regulation 2022 eliminates extra charges for mobile calls, texts and data when abroad in other member states, and wholesale charges must be fair. To ensure internet service providers do not slow speeds for some websites to gain unfair profit, the Net Neutrality Regulation 2015 states providers 'of internet access services shall treat all traffic equally' but this shall not prevent 'reasonable traffic management measures'.

The new internet backbone is made from optical fibre networks, meaning much faster internet than old copper cables. The EU's pledge is at least 100Mbps internet speed to all households in 2025, and 1000Mbps not until 2030, even though speeds 10 times this were available in 2015.

Since today's communications have mostly merged into the internet, the Electronic Communications Code Directive 2018 is critical for EU infrastructure. Article 5 requires a member state regulator or a "competent authority" is set up that will license use of the radio spectrum, through which mobile and internet signals travel. A regulator must also enable access and interconnection to other infrastructure (such as telecomms and broadband cables), protect end-user rights, and monitor "competition issues regarding open internet access" to ensure rights such as universal service and portability of phone numbers. Articles 6–8 require the regulators are independent, with dismissal of heads only for a good reason, and articles 10–11 require cooperation with other authorities. Articles 12–13 require that use of electronic communication networks is authorised by a regulator, and that conditions attached are non-discriminatory, proportionate and transparent. The owner of a communication network has duties to allow access and interconnection on fair terms, and so article 17 requires that its accounts and financial reports are separate from other activities (if the enterprise does other business), article 74 foresees that regulators can control prices, and article 84 says member states should "ensure that all consumers in their territories have access at an affordable price, in light of specific national conditions, to an available adequate broadband internet access service and to voice communications services". While some EU member states have privatised all, and some part, of their telecomms infrastructure, publicly or community-owned internet providers (such as in Denmark or Romania) tend to have the fastest web speeds.

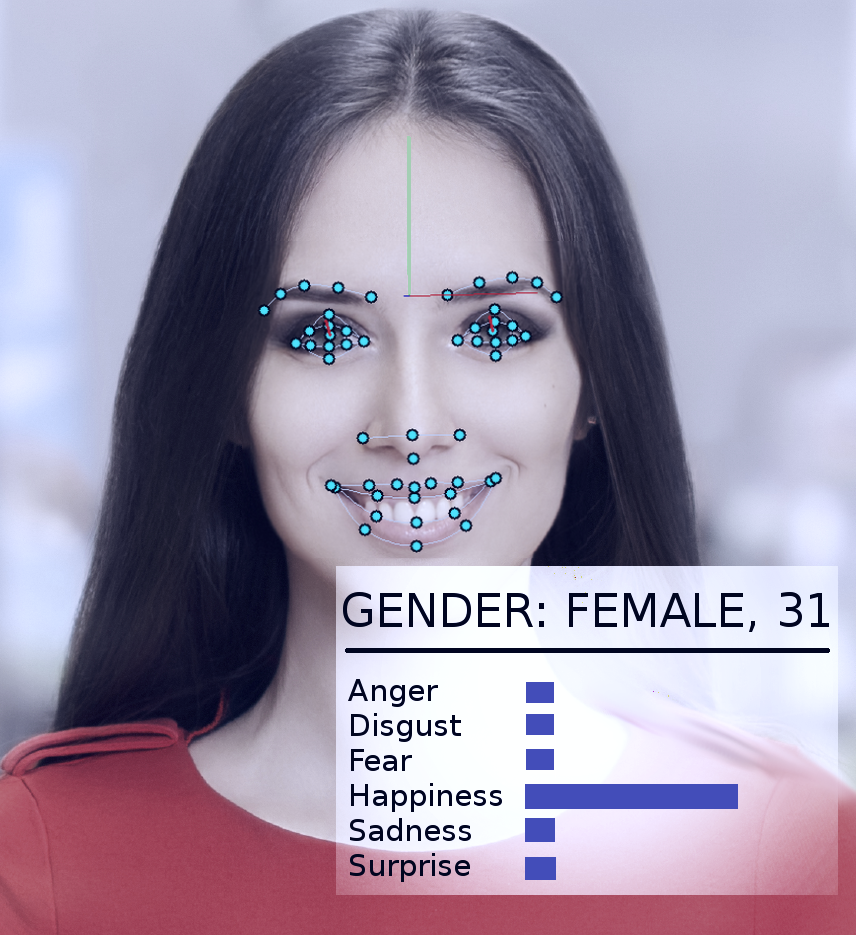
Data protection is a human right, and personal data cannot be processed by any enterprise except with consent or by law under the General Data Protection Regulation 2016.

Historically to protect people's privacy and correspondence, the post banned tampering with letters, and excluded post offices from responsibility for letters even if the contents were for something illegal. As the internet developed, the original Information Society Directive 1998 aimed for something similar, so that internet server providers or email hosts, for instance, protected privacy. After this the Electronic Commerce Directive 2000 also sought to ensure free movement for an "information society service", requiring member states to not restrict them unless it was to fulfill a public policy, prevent crime, fight incitement to hatred, protect individual dignity, protect health, or protect consumers or investors. Articles 12 to 14 further said that an ISS operating as a "mere conduit" for information, doing "caching" or "hosting" is 'not liable for information stored' if the 'provider does not have actual knowledge of illegal activity' and 'is not aware of facts or circumstances from which the illegal activity or information is apparent', but must act quickly to remove or disable access 'upon obtaining knowledge or awareness'. Article 15 states that member states should 'not impose a general obligation on providers... to monitor the information which they transmit or store' nor 'seek facts' on illegality. However the meaning of who was an "ISS" was not clearly defined in law, and has become a problem with social media that was not meant to be protected like private communication. An internet service provider has been held to be an ISS, and so has a Wi-Fi host, the Electronic Commerce Directive 2000 recital 11 states email services, search engines, data storage, and streaming, are information society services, and an individual email is not, and the Information Society Directive 2015 makes clear that TV and radio stations do not count as ISS's. None of these definitions include advertising, which is never "at the request of a recipient of services" as the 2015 Directive requires, however various cases have decided that eBay, Facebook, and AirBnB, may count as ISSs, but the cab app Uber does not.

The main rights to data privacy are found in the General Data Protection Regulation 2016. First, there is the right to have data about someone processed only with their 'consent', or based on other justifiable grounds, such as a lawful purpose. It has been held that consent is not given if there is 'a pre-checked checkbox which the user must deselect to refuse'. Under the Privacy and Electronic Communications Directive 2002 a well-known result is that websites must not install "cookies" into someone's web browser unless they positively accept cookies. The EU has not yet simply enabled people to block all cookies within a browser, and required that websites give people this option without thousands of annoying buttons to click. Second, people have the right to be informed about data kept on them. Third, there is a right to be forgotten and the data to be deleted. Where legal standards do not exist, Alphabet, Facebook or Microsoft have largely been uncontrolled in privacy invasion, for instance, Gmail pioneering surveillance of emails for ads as its first business model, and Facebook abolishing service-user voting rights over changes to its privacy policies in 2012. There are no rights yet in EU law for service-users to vote for representatives on boards of big tech companies that take their data, or to have decision-rights over use of their data, in contrast to the rights of service-users of websites like Wikipedia.

=== Media and markets ===
Pluralism and regulation of the media, such as through 'the licensing of broadcasting, television or cinema enterprises', have long been seen as essential to protect freedom of opinion and expression, to ensure that citizens have a more equal voice, and ultimately to support the universal 'right to take part in the government'. In almost all member states there is a well funded public, and independent broadcaster for TV and radio, and there are common standards for all TV and radio, which are designed to support open, fact-based discussion and deliberative democracy. However, the same standards have not yet been applied to equivalent internet television, radio or "social media" such as the platforms controlled by YouTube (owned by Alphabet), Facebook or Instagram (owned by Meta), or Twitter (owned by Elon Musk), all of which have spread conspiracy theories, discrimination, far-right, extremist, terrorist, and hostile military content.

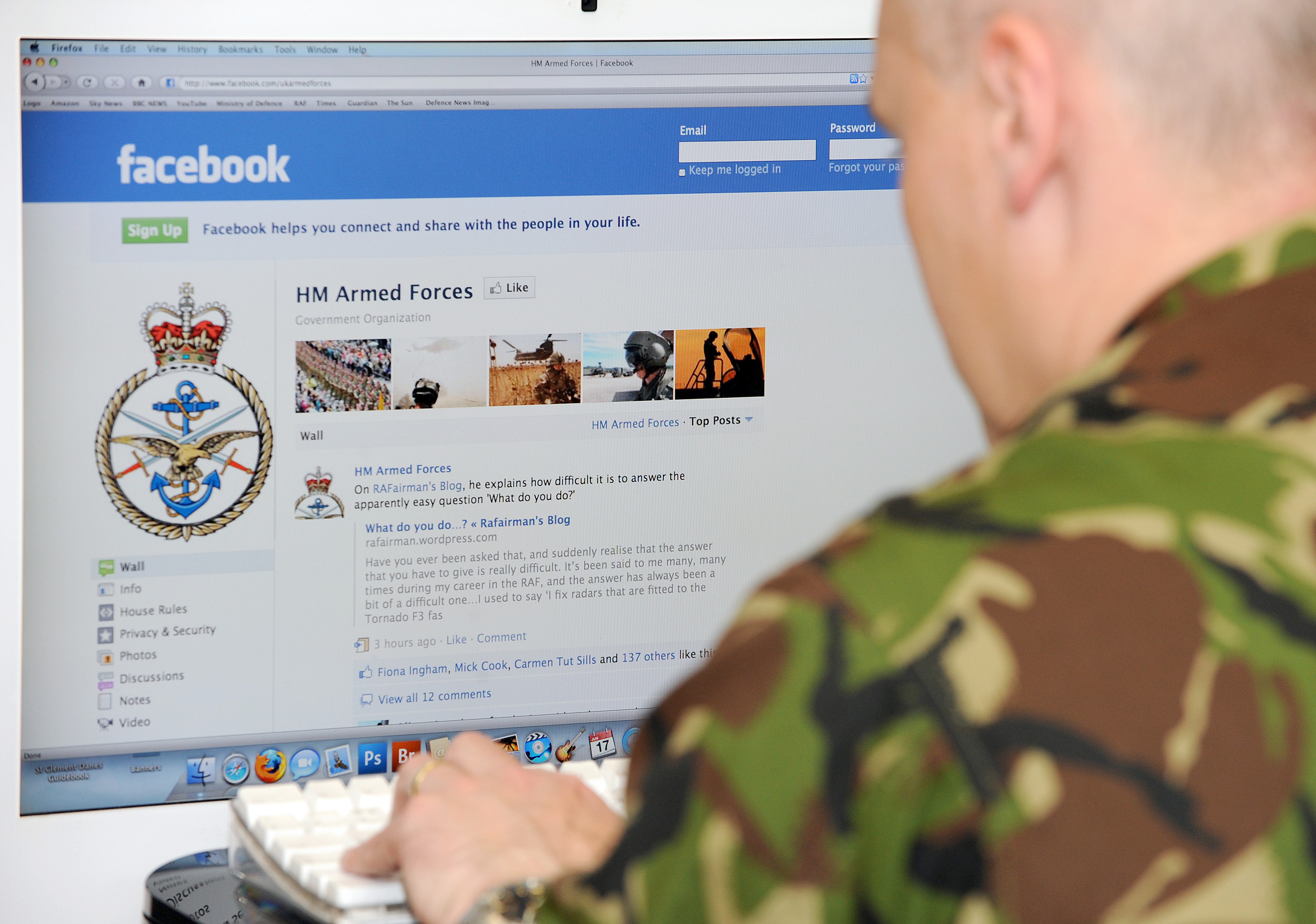
The Brexit, Cruz and Trump campaigns in 2016 took personal Facebook and other data without user's consent, built psychological profiles of everyone, and corporations and the Russian military flooded social media with ads or bots to manipulate voters. EU law does not yet regulate web media spreading false news, discrimination or propaganda.

General standards for broadcasting are found in the Audiovisual Media Services Directive 2010. It defines an audiovisual media services to mean those 'devoted to providing programmes, under the editorial responsibility of a media service provider, to the general public, in order to inform, entertain or educate, to the general public by electronic communications networks', either on TV or an 'on-demand' service. An 'on-demand' service involves 'viewing of programmes at the moment chosen by the user and at his individual request on the basis of a catalogue of programmes selected by the media service provider'. Member states must ensure audiovisual services 'do not contain any incitement to hatred' based on race, sex, religion, nationality or other protected characteristics. Article 9 prohibits media with 'surreptitious' communication or 'subliminal' techniques, to 'prejudice respect for human dignity', that would 'promote any discrimination', prejudice health and safety or 'encourage behaviour grossly prejudicial to the protection of the environment'. Social media on Facebook, YouTube or Twitter may be thought to be exempt as they lack 'editorial responsibility', however each use algorithms to exert 'effective control' and profit from arrangement of media. After 2018 new provisions on "video-sharing platform service" providers were introduced, with duties on member states to ensure under article 28b that video-sharing platform providers protect (a) minors from content that "may impair their physical, mental or moral development", (b) the general public from content "containing incitement to violence or hatred", and (c) the general public from content whose dissemination is criminal in EU law, such as terrorism, child pornography or offences concerning racism or xenophobia. Under the Digital Services Act Regulation 2022 the rules from the Electronic Commerce Directive 2000 were repeated, so that a platform's or "gatekeeper's" liability is limited unless the platforms have failed to act with due diligence to stop certain illegal content, complying with transparent terms and algorithms. New codes of conduct should be drawn up for best practice. Fines for large platforms go up to 6% of annual turnover. These rules fall short of most TV standards that restrict inaccurate news (such as flat Earth conspiracies or global warming denial), discriminatory content short of incitement to hatred, systematic bias, or propaganda from dictatorships or corporations. By contrast, Wikipedia's online content has user-regulated policies preventing uncontrolled use of bots, preventing personal attacks by suspending or banning users that break rules, and ensuring Wikipedia maintains a neutral point of view.

The EU has also begun to regulate marketplaces that operate online, both through competition law and the Digital Markets Act Regulation 2022. First, in a series of Commission decisions, Google and Amazon were fined for competition violations. In the Google Shopping case, the Commission fined Google €2.4 billion for giving preference to its own shopping results over others in Google's search, leading to huge increases in traffic for Google over rivals. In the Google Android case the Commission fined Alphabet Inc (by then Google's rebranded parent name) €4.34 billion, or 4.5% of worldwide turnover, for paying phone manufacturers to pre-install its apps, such as Google search or Chrome, as a condition to license its app marketplace Google Play. In the Google AdSense case, the Commission fined Google €1.49 billion for stopping third-party websites displaying their adverts in Google's embedded search widgets, given that it was dominant in the ad market, and unfairly excluding competitors from results. In the Amazon Marketplace case an investigation for abuse of dominant position was launched for Amazon using other traders' data to benefit its own retail business, and preferencing itself in its "Buy Box" and in access to "Prime" seller status. This was settled after Amazon committed in 2022 "not to use non-public data relating to, or derived from, the independent sellers' activities on its marketplace, for its retail business", and to not discriminate against third parties in its Buy Box and Prime services. The Digital Markets Act codifies many of these standards.

=== Consumer Products ===
The General Product Safety Regulation (GPSR) is a European regulation on consumer protection. It replaces Directive 2001/95/EC on general product safety. The regulation is intended to ensure that products placed on the market in the European internal market do not endanger the health and safety of consumers through a high level of consumer protection. The GPSR mandates a risk-based approach to product safety, requiring manufacturers and other economic operators to conduct comprehensive risk assessments before placing products on the market. These assessments must consider:

- Foreseeable use and misuse of the product
- Chemical, mechanical, and electrical hazards
- Vulnerable consumers, including children, elderly individuals, and persons with disabilities

Where no harmonized standards exist, economic operators must use scientific and technical knowledge to ensure compliance.

=== Foreign, security and trade policy ===
- Common Foreign and Security Policy, including the Common Security and Defence Policy (funded by the European Defence Fund and European Defence Agency), membership of NATO, the United Nations
- TFEU art 214, Directorate-General for European Civil Protection and Humanitarian Aid Operations
- European Neighbourhood Policy
- Common Commercial Policy (EU), European Commissioner for Trade, European Union free trade agreements, World Trade Organization
- TFEU art 218, advisory opinion procedure on international agreements

=== Security and justice ===
- Area of freedom, security and justice and European Arrest Warrant, TFEU art 67

In 2006, a toxic waste spill off the coast of Côte d'Ivoire, from a European ship, prompted the commission to look into legislation against toxic waste. Environment Commissioner Stavros Dimas stated that "Such highly toxic waste should never have left the European Union". With countries such as Spain not even having a crime against shipping toxic waste, Franco Frattini, the Justice, Freedom and Security Commissioner, proposed with Dimas to create criminal sentences for "ecological crimes". The competence for the Union to do this was contested in 2005 at the Court of Justice resulting in a victory for the commission. That ruling set a precedent that the commission, on a supranational basis, may legislate in criminal law – something never done before. So far, the only other proposal has been the draft intellectual property rights directive. Motions were tabled in the European Parliament against that legislation on the basis that criminal law should not be an EU competence, but was rejected at vote. However, in October 2007, the Court of Justice ruled that the commission could not propose what the criminal sanctions could be, only that there must be some.

== See also ==
- EudraLex – EU laws on medicinal products
- Europäische Zeitschrift für Wirtschaftsrecht (European Journal of Business Law)
- European Case Law Identifier – Identifier of court judgements in Europe
- European Legislation Identifier – Uniquely identifies national and EU laws
- Incidental effect – European Union law concept
- Precautionary principle – Risk management strategy
- Unitary patent – Type of patent in the European Union
- List of European Court of Justice rulings
- List of European Union directives

== Sources ==
- Barnard, Catherine (2013). The substantive law of the EU : the four freedoms (4th ed.). Oxford University Press. ISBN 978-0-19-967076-5. (later editions are available)
- Barnard, Catherine & Steve Peers, eds. European Union law, 4th edn. Oxford: Oxford University Press, 2023.
- Bogusz, Barbara; Berry, Elspeth; Strecker, Sophie (2025). Complete EU Law: Text, Cases, and Materials (6th ed.). Oxford: Oxford University Press. ISBN 9780198930327.
- Butler, Graham; Wessel, Ramses A (2022). EU External Relations Law: The Cases in Context. Oxford: Hart Publishing/Bloomsbury. ISBN 978-1-5099-3969-5.
- Craig, Paul; de Búrca, Gráinne (2011). The evolution of EU Law (2nd ed.). Oxford University Press. ISBN 978-0-19-959296-8. (later editions are available)
- Craig, Paul; de Búrca, Gráinne (2015). The evolution of EU Law (2nd ed.). Oxford University Press. ISBN 978-0-19-882118-2.
- Craig, Paul; de Búrca, Gráinne (2024). EU Law: Text, Cases, and Materials (8th ed.). Oxford University Press. ISBN 9780198915553.
- Dickson, Julie & Paulos Eleutheriadēs, eds. Philosophical foundations of European Union law. Oxford: Oxford University Press, 2012.
- Hartley, Trevor (2014). The foundations of European Union law : an introduction to the constitutional and administrative law of European Union. Oxford University Press. ISBN 978-0-19-873467-3.
- Horspool, Margot; Humphreys, Matthew; Wells-Greco, Michael. European Union Law (11th ed.). Oxford: Oxford University Press. ISBN 9780192643452.
- McGaughey, Ewan (2022). Principles of Enterprise Law: the Economic Constitution and Human Rights. Cambridge University Press. ISBN 978-1-009-04573-5.
- Morano-Faodi, Sonia & Jen Neller. Fairhurst's law of the European Union, 13th edn. Harlow/NY: Pearson Education, 2020.
- O'Neill, Aidan (2011). EU Law for UK Lawyers (2nd ed.). Bloomsbury Publishing. ISBN 9781847318107.
- Reich, Norbert, Annette Nordhausen-Scholes, & Jeremy Scholes. Understanding EU internal market law, 3rd rev'd edn. Cambridge: Intersentia, 2015.
- Riesenhuber, Karl, ed. European legal methodology, 2nd edn. Cambridge: Intersentia, 2021.
- Schütze, Robert (2025). European Union Law (4th ed.). Oxford: Oxford University Press. ISBN 9780198941057.
- Tobler, Christa; Beglinger, Jacques (2020). Essential EU Law in Charts. Budapest HVG-ORAC. ISBN 978-963-258-489-8.
- Weiler, JHH (1991). "The Transformation of Europe". Yale Law Journal. 100 (8): 2403–2483. doi:10.2307/796898. ISSN 0044-0094. JSTOR 796898.
