= Konsumentombudsmannen v Gourmet AB =

- Court: European Court of Justice
- Citation: (2001) C-405/98

Keywords
- Free movement of goods

Konsumentombudsmannen v Gourmet AB (2001) C-405/98 is an EU law case, concerning the free movement of goods in the European Union.

== Facts ==
Sweden banned advertisements for alcohol on the radio, TV and in magazines totally (with a few limited exceptions for magazines aimed solely at alcohol suppliers and traders). Sweden argued the measure was lawful because there had been a constant increase in wine sales, mostly imports, and additionally that the ban applied to all alcohol, whether Swedish or not, and so the ban did not have a disproportionate impact on importers.

== Judgment ==
=== Advocate General Jacobs ===
AG Jacobs highlighted that Swedish producers dominated the strong beer market. This was shown by Gourmet's statistics. Ingrained consumer habits would favour national beer.

=== Court of Justice ===
The Court of Justice held the law infringed art 34 but it could be justified on public health grounds if it was proportionate. The ban having an effect on cross-border supply of advertising space breached TFEU art 56 on free movement of services, but this could again potentially be justified on grounds of public health. The court held that it was therefore the role of national courts to decide on a case-by-case basis whether the prohibition in question was proportionate.

8 It should be pointed out that, according to paragraph 17 of its judgment in Keck and Mithouard, if national provisions restricting or prohibiting certain selling arrangements are to avoid being caught by Article 30 of the Treaty, they must not be of such a kind as to prevent access to the market by products from another Member State or to impede access any more than they impede the access of domestic products.

19 The Court has also held, in paragraph 42 of its judgment in Joined Cases C-34/95 to C-36/95 De Agostini and TV-Shop [1997] ECR I-3843, that it cannot be excluded that an outright prohibition, applying in one Member State, of a type of promotion for a product which is lawfully sold there might have a greater impact on products from other Member States.

20 It is apparent that a prohibition on advertising such as that at issue in the main proceedings not only prohibits a form of marketing a product but in reality prohibits producers and importers from directing any advertising messages at consumers, with a few insignificant exceptions.

21 Even without its being necessary to carry out a precise analysis of the facts characteristic of the Swedish situation, which it is for the national court to do, the Court is able to conclude that, in the case of products like alcoholic beverages, the consumption of which is linked to traditional social practices and to local habits and customs, a prohibition of all advertising directed at consumers in the form of advertisements in the press, on the radio and on television, the direct mailing of unsolicited material or the placing of posters on the public highway is liable to impede access to the market by products from other Member States more than it impedes access by domestic products, with which consumers are instantly more familiar.

22 The information provided by the Consumer Ombudsman and the Swedish Government concerning the relative increase in Sweden in the consumption of wine and whisky, which are mainly imported, in comparison with other products such as vodka, which is mainly of Swedish origin, does not alter that conclusion. First, it cannot be precluded that, in the absence of the legislation at issue in the main proceedings, the change indicated would have been greater; second, that information takes into account only some alcoholic beverages and ignores, in particular, beer consumption.

23 Furthermore, although publications containing advertisements may be distributed at points of sale, Systembolaget AB, the company wholly owned by the Swedish State which has a monopoly of retail sales in Sweden, in fact only distributes its own magazine at those points of sale.

24 Last, Swedish legislation does not prohibit editorial advertising, that is to say, the promotion, in articles forming part of the editorial content of the publication, of products in relation to which the insertion of direct advertisements is prohibited. The Commission correctly observes that, for various, principally cultural, reasons, domestic producers have easier access to that means of advertising than their competitors established in other Member States. That circumstance is liable to increase the imbalance inherent in the absolute prohibition on direct advertising.

25 A prohibition on advertising such as that at issue in the main proceedings must therefore be regarded as affecting the marketing of products from other Member States more heavily than the marketing of domestic products and as therefore constituting an obstacle to trade between Member States caught by Article 30 of the Treaty.

26 However, such an obstacle may be justified by the protection of public health, a general interest ground recognised by Article 36 of the Treaty.

27 in that regard, it is accepted that rules restricting the advertising of alcoholic beverages in order to combat alcohol abuse reflects public health concerns (Case 152/78 Commission v France [1980] ECR 2299, paragraph 17, and Joined Cases C-1/90 and C-176/90 Aragonesa de Publicidad Exterior and Publivía [1991] ECR I-4151, paragraph 15).

28 in order for public health concerns to be capable of justifying an obstacle to trade such as that inherent in the prohibition on advertising at issue in the main proceedings, the measure concerned must also be proportionate to the objective to be achieved and must not constitute either a means of arbitrary discrimination or a disguised restriction on trade between Member States.

== Aftermath ==
In March 2002 the Stockholm District Court ruled that the ban was not proportionate to its objective, and resultingly incompatible with EU law. The judgement was appealed by the Consumer Ombudsman and in February 2004, the Swedish Market Court confirmed the District Court's judgement. The ban was resultingly lifted.

== See also ==
- European Union law
- 44 Liquormart, Inc. v. Rhode Island, 517 US 484 (1996)
