= Liga Portuguesa de Futebol v Santa Casa da Misericórdia de Lisboa =

2009 decision of the European Court of Justice

Liga Portuguesa de Futebol v Departamento de Jogos
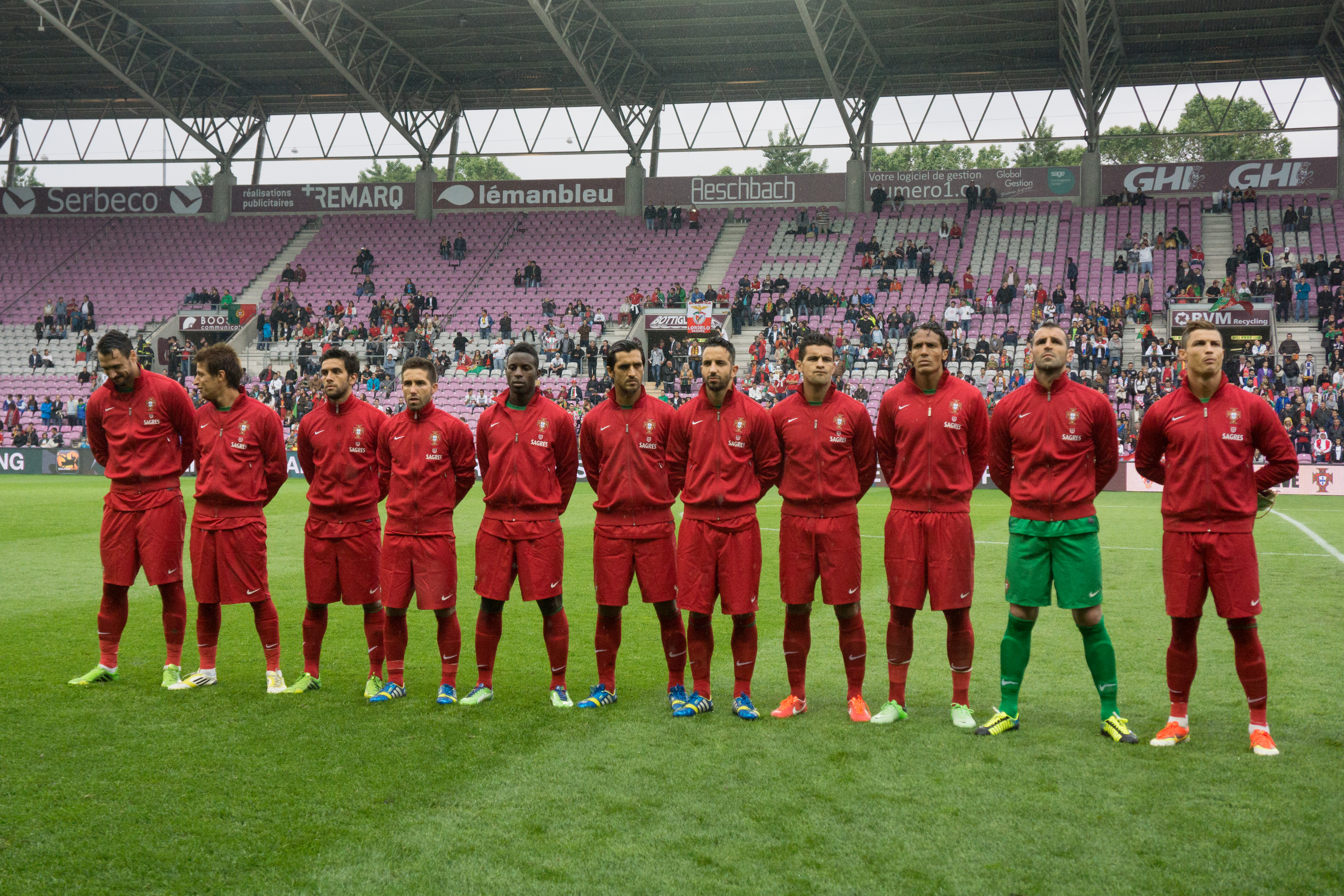
- Court: European Court of Justice
- Citation: (2009) C‑42/07

Keywords
- Free movement of services

Liga Portuguesa de Futebol Profissional and Bwin International Ltd v Departamento de Jogos da Santa Casa da Misericórdia de Lisboa (2009) C‑42/07 is an EU law case, concerning the free movement of services in the European Union.

== Facts ==
The Liga Portuguesa de Futebol Profissional (the Portugal football league) and Bwin Ltd (an online gambling company in Gibraltar) claimed that fines from the Departamento de Jogos were contrary to the TFEU article 56 (ex article 49 TEC) on freedom to provide services, as well as freedom of establishment and free movement of payments. The Departamento de Jogos monopolised gambling in Portugal, and it argued this was justified under TFEU article 52 (referred to by art 62). A law prohibited games of chance via the internet. The Departamento de Jogos ran, for example, the Portuguese national lottery, established in 1783, and continued with people drawing numbers by lots. It allowed the Totobola for betting on football and Totogolo for betting on the number of goals. It imposed fines of €65k on Liga and €74,500 on Bwin for administrative offences of organising internet gaming that conflicted with the Santa Casa.

== Judgment ==
The Court of Justice, Grand Chamber, held that the ban would be justifiable. Gambling was a particular problem, and fraud had an increased likelihood over the internet, so a full ban was proportionate toward the aim pursued.

47 As to whether Article 56 EC is applicable, it must be noted that any restrictive effects which the national legislation at issue in the main proceedings might have on the free movement of capital and payments would be no more than the inevitable consequence of any restrictions on the freedom to provide services. Where a national measure relates to several fundamental freedoms at the same time, the Court will in principle examine the measure in relation to only one of those freedoms if it appears, in the circumstances of the case, that the other freedoms are entirely secondary in relation to the first and may be considered together with it (see, to that effect, Case C-452/04 Fidium Finanz [2006] ECR I‑9521, paragraph 34 and case-law cited).

[...]

51 Article 49 EC requires the abolition of all restrictions on the freedom to provide services, even if those restrictions apply without distinction to national providers of services and to those from other Member States, when they are liable to prohibit, impede or render less advantageous the activities of a service provider established in another Member State where it lawfully provides similar services (see, to that effect, Case C‑76/90 Säger [1991] ECR I-4221, paragraph 12, and Case C-58/98 Corsten [2000] ECR I-7919, paragraph 33). Moreover, the freedom to provide services is for the benefit of both providers and recipients of services (see, to that effect, Joined Cases 286/82 and 26/83 Luisi and Carbone [1984] ECR 377, paragraph 16).

52 It is accepted that the legislation of a Member State which prohibits providers such as Bwin, established in other Member States, from offering via the internet services in the territory of that first Member State constitutes a restriction on the freedom to provide services enshrined in Article 49 EC (see, to that effect, Case C-243/01 Gambelli and Others [2003] ECR I‑13031, paragraph 54).

53 Such legislation also imposes a restriction on the freedom of the residents of the Member State concerned to enjoy, via the internet, services which are offered in other Member States.

[...]

56 Article 46(1) EC allows restrictions justified on grounds of public policy, public security or public health. In addition, a certain number of overriding reasons in the public interest have been recognised by case-law, such as the objectives of consumer protection and the prevention of both fraud and incitement to squander money on gambling, as well as the general need to preserve public order (see, to that effect, Placanica and Others, paragraph 46 and case-law cited).

57 In that context, as most of the Member States which submitted observations to the Court have noted, the legislation on games of chance is one of the areas in which there are significant moral, religious and cultural differences between the Member States. In the absence of Community harmonisation in the field, it is for each Member State to determine in those areas, in accordance with its own scale of values, what is required in order to ensure that the interests in question are protected (see, inter alia, Case 34/79 Henn and Darby [1979] ECR 3795, paragraph 15; Case C-275/92 Schindler [1994] ECR I-1039, paragraph 32; Case C-268/99 Jany and Others [2001] ECR I‑8615, paragraphs 56 and 60, and Placanica and Others, paragraph 47).

[...]

59 The Member States are therefore free to set the objectives of their policy on betting and gambling and, where appropriate, to define in detail the level of protection sought. However, the restrictive measures that they impose must satisfy the conditions laid down in the case-law of the Court as regards their proportionality (Placanica and Others, paragraph 48).

60 In the present case, it is thus necessary to examine in particular whether the restriction of the provision of games of chance via the internet, imposed by the national legislation at issue in the main proceedings, is suitable for achieving the objective or objectives invoked by the Member State concerned, and whether it does not go beyond what is necessary in order to achieve those objectives. In any event, those restrictions must be applied without discrimination (see, to that effect, Placanica and Others, paragraph 49).

61 In that context, it must be recalled that national legislation is appropriate for ensuring attainment of the objective pursued only if it genuinely reflects a concern to attain it in a consistent and systematic manner (Case C-169/07 Hartlauer [2009] ECR I‑0000, paragraph 55).

[...]

63 In that connection, it should be noted that the fight against crime may constitute an overriding reason in the public interest that is capable of justifying restrictions in respect of operators authorised to offer services in the games-of-chance sector. Games of chance involve a high risk of crime or fraud, given the scale of the earnings and the potential winnings on offer to gamblers.

64 The Court has also recognised that limited authorisation of games on an exclusive basis has the advantage of confining the operation of gambling within controlled channels and of preventing the risk of fraud or crime in the context of such operation (see Läärä and Others, paragraph 37, and Zenatti, paragraph 35).

65 The Portuguese Government submits that the grant of exclusive rights to Santa Casa to organise games of chance ensures that the system will function in a secure and controlled way. First, Santa Casa’s long existence, spanning more than five centuries, is evidence of that body’s reliability. Second, the Portuguese Government points out that Santa Casa operates under its strict control. The legal framework for games of chance, Santa Casa’s statutes and government involvement in appointing the members of its administrative organs enable the State to exercise an effective power of supervision over Santa Casa. That system, based on legislation and Santa Casa’s statutes, provides the State with sufficient guarantees that the rules for ensuring fairness in the games of chance organised by Santa Casa will be observed.

[...]

69 In that regard, it should be noted that the sector involving games of chance offered via the internet has not been the subject of Community harmonisation. A Member State is therefore entitled to take the view that the mere fact that an operator such as Bwin lawfully offers services in that sector via the internet in another Member State, in which it is established and where it is in principle already subject to statutory conditions and controls on the part of the competent authorities in that State, cannot be regarded as amounting to a sufficient assurance that national consumers will be protected against the risks of fraud and crime, in the light of the difficulties liable to be encountered in such a context by the authorities of the Member State of establishment in assessing the professional qualities and integrity of operators.

70 In addition, because of the lack of direct contact between consumer and operator, games of chance accessible via the internet involve different and more substantial risks of fraud by operators against consumers compared with the traditional markets for such games.

[...]

72 It follows that, in the light of the specific features associated with the provision of games of chance via the internet, the restriction at issue in the main proceedings may be regarded as justified by the objective of combating fraud and crime.

== See also ==
- European Union law
