= Commission v Italy (C-14/00) =

EU law case

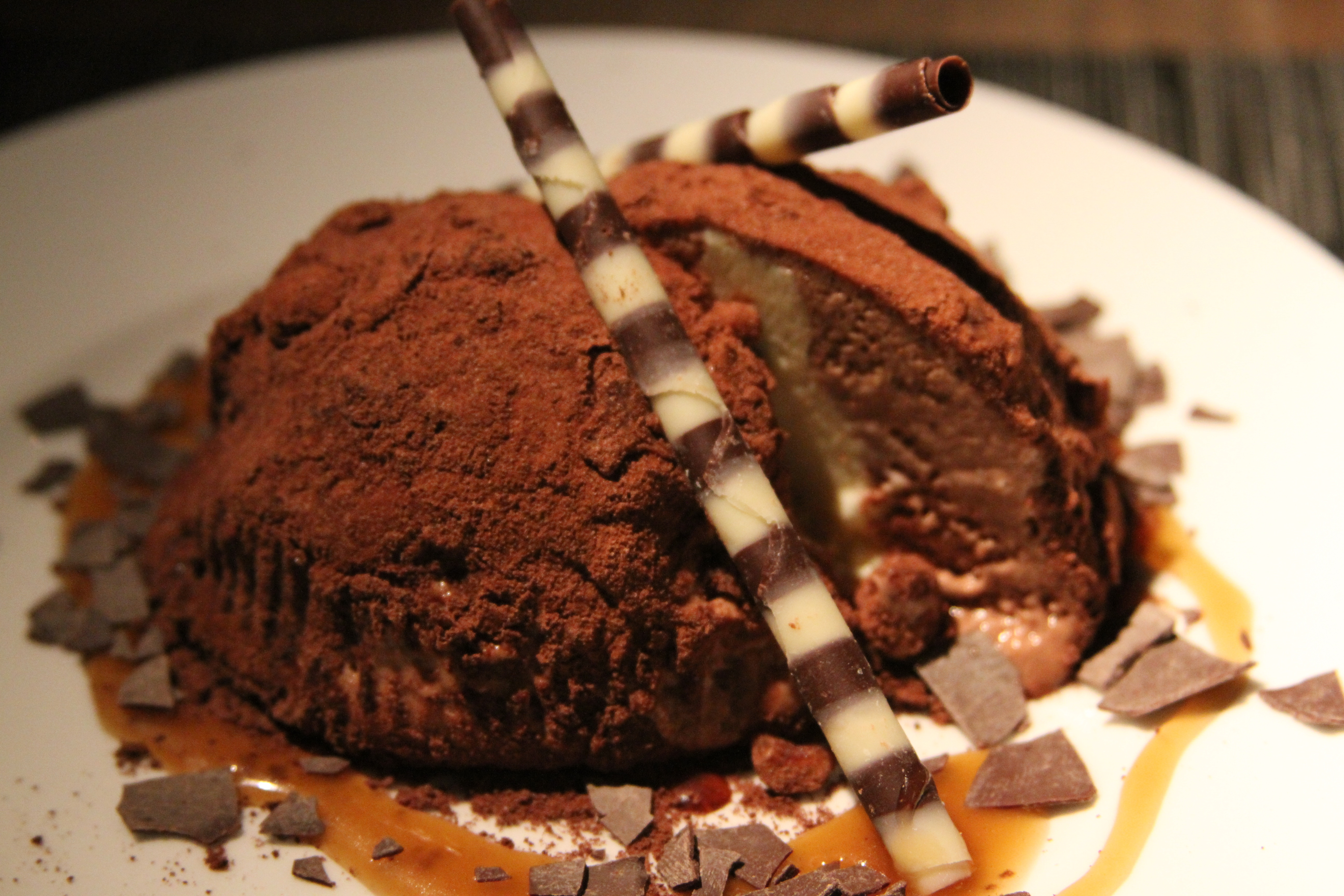
- Court: European Court of Justice
- Citation: (2003) C-14/00

Keywords
- Free movement of goods

Commission v Italy (2003) C-14/00 is an EU law case, concerning the free movement of goods in the European Union.

== Facts ==
An Italian rule limited the name ‘chocolate’ to products without vegetable fats. Those with vegetable fats, mainly British, Irish, and Danish chocolate, were made to label themselves ‘chocolate substitutes’. The Commission argued this breached Directive 73/241, passed under what is now article 115 TFEU, where article 1 said cocoa and chocolate products mean those in Annex 1, within minimum cocoa content to be described as chocolate. It also argued it infringed TFEU article 34, as the word ‘substitute’ devalued the good. Italy, under point 7(a) of the Annex said the free movement clause only applied to products without vegetable fats.

== Judgment ==
The Court of Justice held that the requirement was contrary to article 34. Under the Directive, the UK, Ireland, Denmark could authorise manufacturers to add vegetable fats to chocolate made there, but it could not benefit from the free movement clause. TFEU article 34 applied to obstacles to marketing products. The Italian rule would make British producers adjust their products and incur additional packaging costs. The Italian law had to be justified by a mandatory requirement, and steps must be proportionate. On the facts, the addition of vegetable fat did not substantially modify the product. So a ‘neutral and objective statement’ informing consumers would be enough. Obliging a change of the sale name was going further than necessary to protect consumers.

82 It is therefore important to ascertain whether the addition to cocoa and chocolate products of vegetable fats other than cocoa butter substantially alters their composition, so that they no longer present the characteristics expected by consumers buying products bearing the name chocolate and that a label providing appropriate information as to their composition cannot be considered sufficient to avoid confusion in the minds of consumers.

83 The characteristic element of cocoa and chocolate products within the meaning of Directive 73/241 is the presence of a certain minimum cocoa and cocoa butter content.

84 In particular, it should be recalled that, in accordance with point 1.16 of Annex I to Directive 73/241, products meeting the definition of chocolate within the meaning of the directive must contain a minimum total dry cocoa solids content of 35%, with at least 14% of dry non-fat cocoa solids and 18% of cocoa butter.

85 The percentages set by Directive 73/241 are minimum contents which must be complied with by all chocolate products manufactured and marketed under the name chocolate in the Community, independently of whether the legislation of the Member State of production authorises the addition of vegetable fats other than cocoa butter.

86 In addition, it must be pointed out that, since Directive 73/241 explicitly permits Member States to authorise the use, in the manufacture of cocoa and chocolate products, of vegetable fats other than cocoa butter, it cannot be claimed that the products to which those fats have been added, in compliance with that directive, are altered to the point where they no longer fall into the same category as those which do not contain such fats.

87 Therefore, the addition of vegetable fats other than cocoa butter to cocoa and chocolate products which satisfy the minimum contents required by Directive 73/241 cannot substantially alter the nature of those products to the point where they are transformed into different products.

88 It follows that the inclusion in the label of a neutral and objective statement informing consumers of the presence in the product of vegetable fats other than cocoa butter would be sufficient to ensure that consumers are given correct information.

89 In those circumstances, the obligation to change the sales name of those products which is imposed by the Italian legislation does not appear to be necessary to satisfy the overriding requirement of consumer protection.
