= Josemans v Burgemeester van Maastricht =

European Union law case from 2010

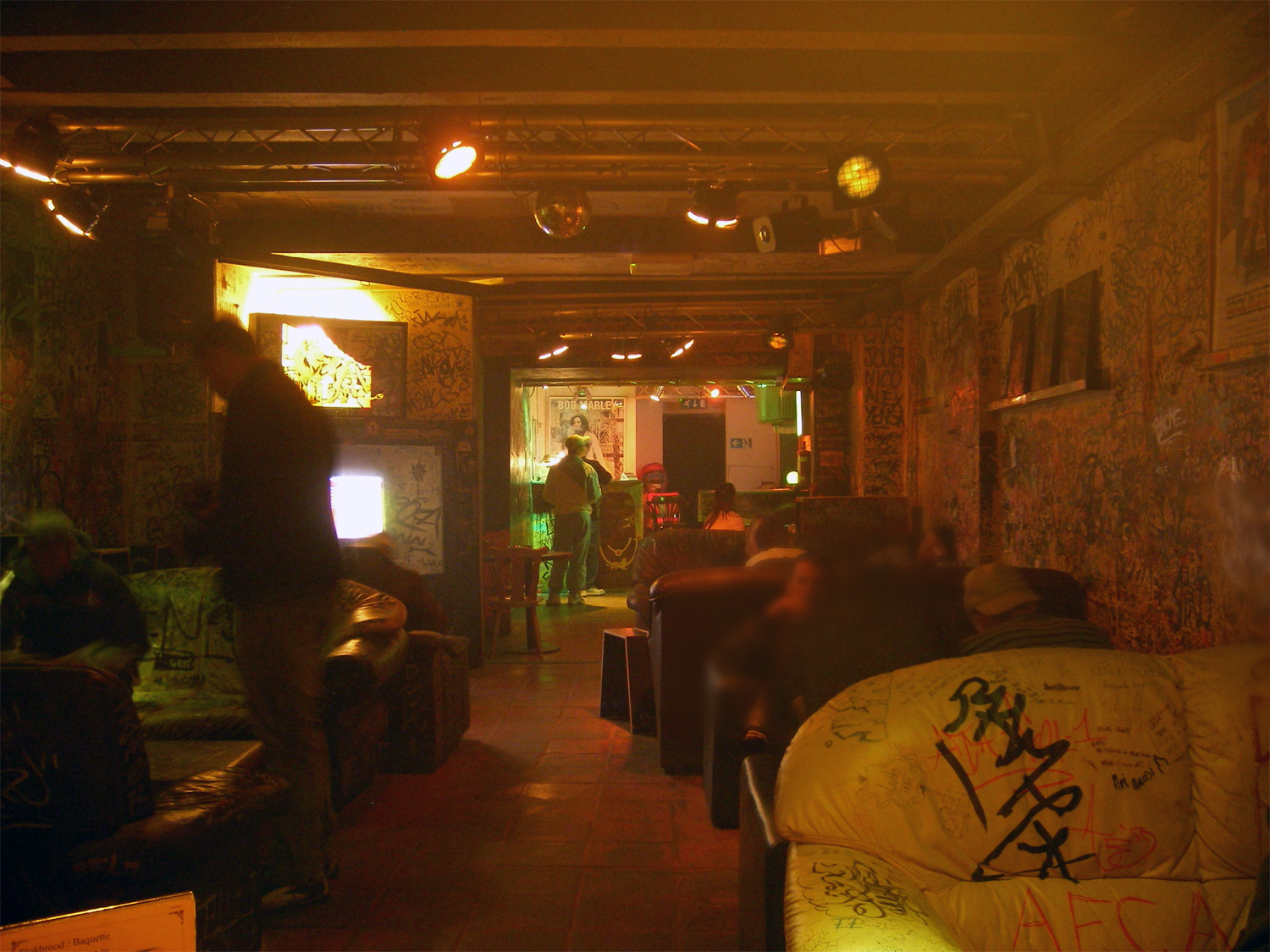
- Court: European Court of Justice
- Citations: (2010) C-137/09, [2010] I-13019

Keywords
- Free movement of services

Josemans v Burgemeester van Maastricht (case C-137/09) is a European Union law case from 2010, concerning cannabis and the free movement of services in the European Union. The Second Chamber of the Court of Justice of the European Union pronounced its ruling on 16 December 2010.

== Facts ==
Netherlands prohibited marketing of marijuana, but tolerated by law. Municipal legislation in Maastricht limited access to marijuana cafes to residents only. Josemans, who ran a coffee shop selling marijuana, claimed that this prohibition contravened the freedom to provide services under TFEU article 56, and that it would have to be justified.

== Judgment ==
The Court of Justice, Second Chamber, held that TFEU article 56 could not be relied on to challenge municipal laws. Legislation restricting free movement of services was justified by the need to combat drug tourism.

63 In the present case, it is common ground that the rules at issue in the main proceedings are intended to put an end to the public nuisance caused by the large number of tourists wanting to purchase or consume cannabis in the coffee-shops in the municipality of Maastricht. According to the information provided by the Burgemeester van Maastricht at the hearing, the 14 coffee-shops in the municipality attract around 10 000 visitors per day and a little more than 3.9 million visitors per year, 70% of which are not resident in the Netherlands.

74 In the present case, it cannot be denied that the policy of tolerance applied by the Kingdom of the Netherlands with regard to the sale of cannabis encourages persons who are resident in other Member States to travel to that State, and more specifically to the municipalities in which coffee-shops are tolerated, in particular in border regions, in order to buy and consume that drug. Furthermore, according to the information in the case-file, some of those persons purchase cannabis in such establishments in order to export it illegally to other Member States.

75 It is indisputable that a prohibition on admitting non-residents to coffee-shops, such as that which is the subject-matter of the dispute in the main proceedings, constitutes a measure capable of substantially limiting drug tourism and, consequently, of reducing the problems it causes.

76 In that connection, it is important to point out that the discriminatory nature of the rules at issue in the main proceedings does not, on its own, mean that the way in which they pursue the intended objective is inconsistent. Although the Court took the view in Adoui and Cornuaille that a Member State cannot validly rely on grounds of public policy with regard to the behaviour of a non-national inasmuch as it does not adopt repressive measures or other genuine and effective measures with respect to the same conduct on the part of its own nationals, the fact remains that the dispute in the main proceedings is part of a different legal context.

77 As was pointed out in paragraph 36 of this judgment, there is, under international law and European Union law, a prohibition in all the Member States on marketing narcotic drugs, with the exception of strictly controlled trade for use for medical and scientific purposes. By contrast, prostitution, the behaviour referred to in Adoui and Cornuaille, aside from trafficking in human beings, is tolerated or regulated in a number of Member States (see, to that effect, Case C-268/99 Jany and Others [2001] ECR I‑8615, paragraph 57).

78 It cannot be held to be inconsistent for a Member State to adopt appropriate measures to deal with a large influx of residents from other Member States who wish to benefit from the marketing – tolerated in that Member State – of products which are, by their very nature, prohibited in all Member States from being offered for sale.

[...]

83 In such circumstances, it must be stated that rules such as those at issue in the main proceedings are suitable for attaining the objective of combating drug tourism and the accompanying public nuisance and do not go beyond what is necessary in order to attain it.

84 Having regard to all of the foregoing considerations, the answer to the second question is that Article 49 EC must be interpreted as meaning that rules such as those at issue in the main proceedings constitute a restriction on the freedom to provide services laid down by the EC Treaty. That restriction is, however, justified by the objective of combating drug tourism and the accompanying public nuisance.

== Significance ==
The case has been criticised for its inconsistency on previous Court of Justice cases on illegal services. For example, De Witte writes the following.

The Court’s logic in Josemans, however, presumes that only residents are allowed to act in certain ways, and, conversely, that foreign residents are bound by limits to permissible behaviour from their home State even when they are abroad. The absurdity of this “logic” becomes clear quickly if we transpose it to different policy areas. It would presume, for example, that only German residents may drive 160 km/h on the autobahn, only Spanish residents can be a matador, or only Slovak residents are allowed to smoke in a bar in Bratislava. Equally, it entails that German residents may not play lasergames in Sofia, that Irish residents may not have an abortion in Stockholm, that a Swedish tourist may not buy alcohol in an off-licence in Firenze, and that his British friend must leave the pub there at 11pm.

== See also ==
- European Union law
