= Société anonyme Cimenteries CBR Cementsbedrijven NV v Commission =

Noordwijks Cement Accoord
- Court: European Court of Justice
- Citation: (1967) Case 8/66

Keywords
- Judicial review

Société anonyme Cimenteries CBR Cementsbedrijven NV v Commission (1967) Case 8/66 is an EU law case, concerning judicial review in the European Union.

== Facts ==
Under (what is now) TFEU article 101, the Council adopted Regulation 17, imposing fines on cartels, with exemptions for agreements that appeared economically beneficial. A restrictive agreement had to be notified to the commission, to decide if it was anti-competitive or exempt. Because this procedure took time, article 15(5) said undertakings had immunity from fines when the agreement was notified until the commission's decision. But under article 15(6) the immunity would not apply after the Commission informed undertakings of their preliminary examination. The Noordwijk Cement companies got a letter under article 15(6) saying their immunity ceased, and it brought an action to quash the decision. The Commission argued their decision was not an ‘act’ that could be quashed, and was a mere opinion.

== Judgment ==
The Court of Justice held that the decision was an act, by removing immunity under article 15(5).

91 This measure deprived them of the advantages of a legal situation which Article 15(5) attached to the notification of the agreement, and exposed them to a grave financial risk.

== See also ==
- European Union law
