= Angonese v Cassa di Risparmio di Bolzano SpA =

Roman Angonese v Cassa di Risparmio di Bolzano S.p.A.
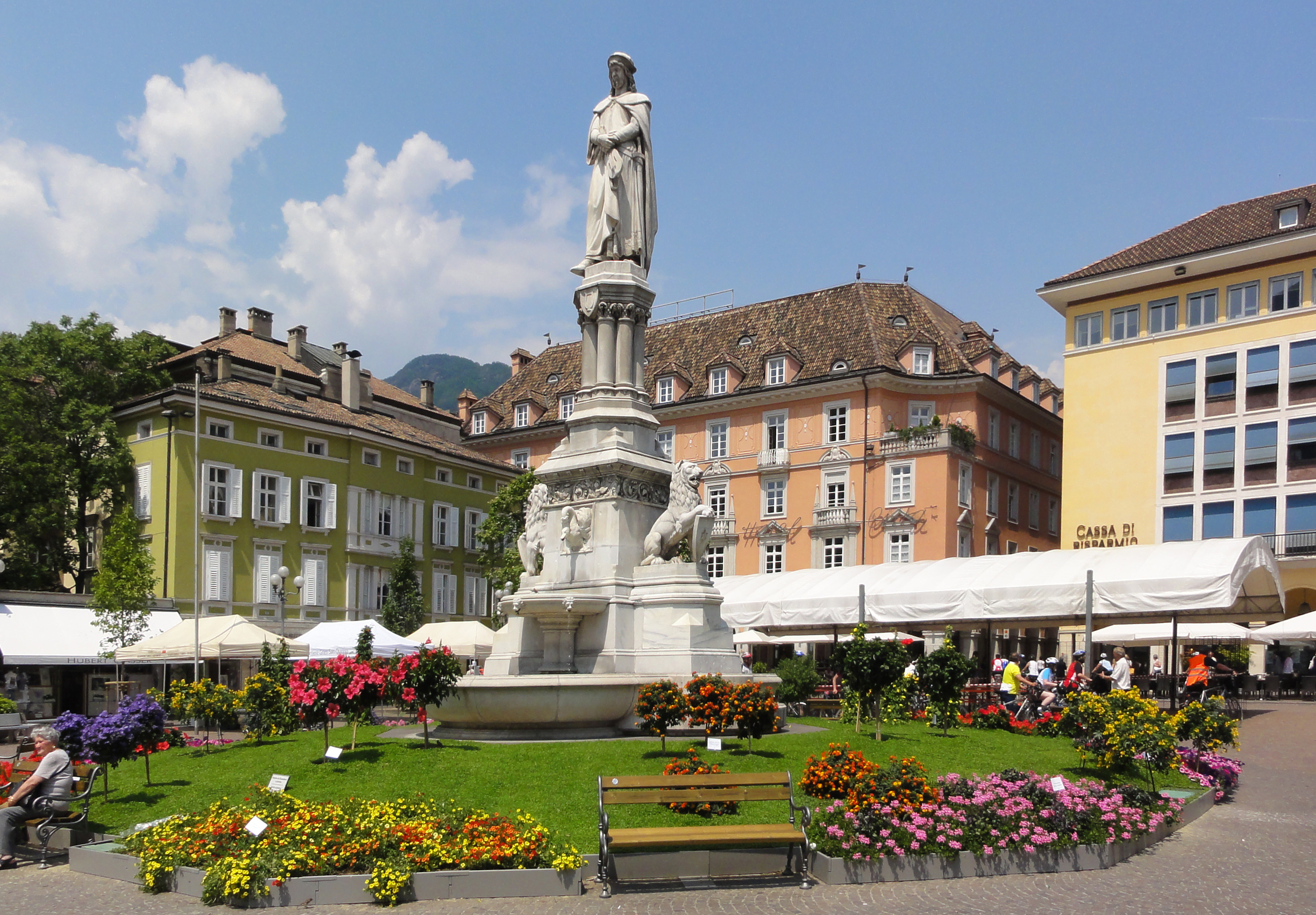
- Waltherplatz, Cassa di Risparmio on the right
- Court: European Court of Justice
- Citation: (2000) C-281/98

Keywords
- Free movement of workers

Roman Angonese v Cassa di Risparmio di Bolzano S.p.A. (2000) C-281/98 is an EU law case, concerning the free movement of workers in the European Union.

== Facts ==
A bank in Bolzano, where Italian and German are spoken, required a certificate of bilingualism. The certificate could only be obtained in Bolzano. Angonese was Italian and had studied in Austria. He was told he could not apply for a job at the bank because he had no certificate, despite being able to speak both languages.

== Judgment ==
The Court of Justice held that the bank's rule was indirect discrimination under TFEU article 45. Because most Bolzano residents were Italian, the requirement to get a certificate in Bolzano put other member state nationals at a disadvantage.

34 The Court has also ruled that the fact that certain provisions of the Treaty are formally addressed to the Member States does not prevent rights from being conferred at the same time on any individual who has an interest in compliance with the obligations thus laid down (see Case 43/75 Defrenne v Sabena [1976] ECR 455, paragraph 31). The Court accordingly held, in relation to a provision of the Treaty which was mandatory in nature, that the prohibition of discrimination applied equally to all agreements intended to regulate paid labour collectively, as well as to contracts between individuals (see Defrenne, paragraph 39).

35 Such considerations must, a fortiori, be applicable to Article 48 of the Treaty, which lays down a fundamental freedom and which constitutes a specific application of the general prohibition of discrimination contained in Article 6 of the EC Treaty (now, after amendment, Article 12 EC). In that respect, like Article 119 of the EC Treaty (Articles 117 to 120 of the EC Treaty have been replaced by Articles 136 EC to 143 EC), it is designed to ensure that there is no discrimination on the labour market.

36 Consequently, the prohibition of discrimination on grounds of nationality laid down in Article 48 of the Treaty must be regarded as applying to private persons as well.

37 The next matter to be considered is whether a requirement imposed by an employer, such as the Cassa di Risparmio, which makes admission to a recruitment competition conditional on possession of one particular diploma, such as the Certificate, constitutes discrimination contrary to Article 48 of the Treaty.

38 According to the order for reference, the Cassa di Risparmio accepts only the Certificate as evidence of the requisite linguistic knowledge and the Certificate can be obtained only in one province of the Member State concerned.

39 Persons not resident in that province therefore have little chance of acquiring the Certificate and it will be difficult, or even impossible, for them to gain access to the employment in question.

40 Since the majority of residents of the province of Bolzano are Italian nationals, the obligation to obtain the requisite Certificate puts nationals of other Member States at a disadvantage by comparison with residents of the province.

41 That is so notwithstanding that the requirement in question affects Italian nationals resident in other parts of Italy as well as nationals of other Member States. In order for a measure to be treated as being discriminatory on grounds of nationality under the rules relating to the free movement of workers, it is not necessary for the measure to have the effect of putting at an advantage all the workers of one nationality or of putting at a disadvantage only workers who are nationals of other Member States, but not workers of the nationality in question.

42 A requirement, such as the one at issue in the main proceedings, making the right to take part in a recruitment competition conditional upon possession of a language diploma that may be obtained in only one province of a Member State and not allowing any other equivalent evidence could be justified only if it were based on objective factors unrelated to the nationality of the persons concerned and if it were in proportion to the aim legitimately pursued.

43 The Court has ruled that the principle of non-discrimination precludes any requirement that the linguistic knowledge in question must have been acquired within the national territory (see Case C-379/87 Groener v Minister for Education and the City of Dublin Vocational Educational Committee [1989] ECR 3967, paragraph 23).

44 So, even though requiring an applicant for a post to have a certain level of linguistic knowledge may be legitimate and possession of a diploma such as the Certificate may constitute a criterion for assessing that knowledge, the fact that it is impossible to submit proof of the required linguistic knowledge by any other means, in particular by equivalent qualifications obtained in other Member States, must be considered disproportionate in relation to the aim in view.

45 It follows that, where an employer makes a person's admission to a recruitment competition subject to a requirement to provide evidence of his linguistic knowledge exclusively by means of one particular diploma, such as the Certificate, issued only in one particular province of a Member State, that requirement constitutes discrimination on grounds of nationality contrary to Article 48 of the EC Treaty.

46 The reply to be given to the question submitted must therefore be that Article 48 of the Treaty precludes an employer from requiring persons applying to take part in a recruitment competition to provide evidence of their linguistic knowledge exclusively by means of one particular diploma issued only in one particular province of a Member State.

== See also ==
- European Union law
