= Nordsee case =

- European Court of Justice
- Full case name: Nordsee Deutsche Hochseefischerei GmbH v Reederei Mond Hochseefischerei Nordstern AG & Co KG
- Case: C-102/81

Legislation affecting
- Treaty on the Functioning of the European Union

Keywords
- Preliminary References (Article 267 TFEU)

Nordsee Deutsche Hochseefischerei GmbH v Reederei Mond Hochseefischerei Nordstern AG & Co KG is a case referred to the European Court of Justice (ECJ) by a German arbitrator by virtue of Article 267 of the Treaty on the Functioning of the European Union (formerly Article 234 of the Treaty establishing the European Community). This article gives the "Courts or Tribunals" of Member States the power to refer matters involving the interpretation or application of European Union law to the ECJ. It was held in this case that the ECJ could not rule on questions referred to it by an arbitrator because an arbitral body is not a court or tribunal of a Member State as defined in Article 234.

== Legal principle ==
The decision in this case contributed to the definition of a court or tribunal as per Article 267. As the case involved a national body responsible for offering alternatives to dispute resolutions by courts, it was argued that it could be considered as a court or tribunal. The judges stated in the judgement that the body could not refer a case to the ECJ:

1. If the alternative procedure is, in fact and law, chosen in preference to recourse to ordinary courts; and:
2. If the public authorities of a Member State are not involved in the choice of recourse to the alternative method of dispute resolution, and do not intervene in the course of its procedure.
