= Weigel v Finanzlandesdirektion für Vorarlberg =

- Court: European Court of Justice
- Citation: (2004) C-387/01

Keywords
- Free movement of workers

Weigel v Finanzlandesdirektion für Vorarlberg (2004) C-387/01 is an EU law case, concerning the free movement of workers in the European Union.

== Facts ==
Mr Weigel got a job in Austria. He and his wife transferred their residence from Germany to Austria and also brought their cars there. Re-registration of their vehicles incurred a high tax charge. They claimed this breached TFEU art 45(2).

== Judgment ==
The Court of Justice, Sixth Chamber, held the tax was justified.

52 The provisions of the Treaty relating to freedom of movement for persons are intended to facilitate the pursuit by Community citizens of occupational activities of all kinds throughout the Community, and preclude measures which might place Community citizens at a disadvantage when they wish to pursue an economic activity in the territory of another Member State (see, in particular, Bosman, cited above, paragraph 94, Case C-18/95 Terhoeve [1999] ECR I-345, paragraph 37, and Case C-190/98 Graf [2000] ECR I-493, paragraph 21).

53 A rule such as that at issue in the main proceedings applies without regard to the nationality of the worker concerned to all those who register a car in Austria and, accordingly, it is applicable without distinction.

54 It is true that it is likely to have a negative bearing on the decision of migrant workers to exercise their right to freedom of movement.

55 However, the Treaty offers no guarantee to a worker that transferring his activities to a Member State other than the one in which he previously resided will be neutral as regards taxation. Given the disparities in the legislation of the Member States in this area, such a transfer may be to the worker’s advantage in terms of indirect taxation or not, according to circumstance. It follows that, in principle, any disadvantage, by comparison with the situation in which the worker pursued his activities prior to the transfer, is not contrary to Article 39 EC if that legislation does not place that worker at a disadvantage as compared with those who were already subject to it (see, in relation to social security, Joined Cases C‑393/99 and C-394/99 Hervein and Others [2002] ECR I-2829, paragraph 51).

== See also ==
- European Union law
