= Geraets-Smits v Stichting Ziekenfonds =

2001 EU case on access to services

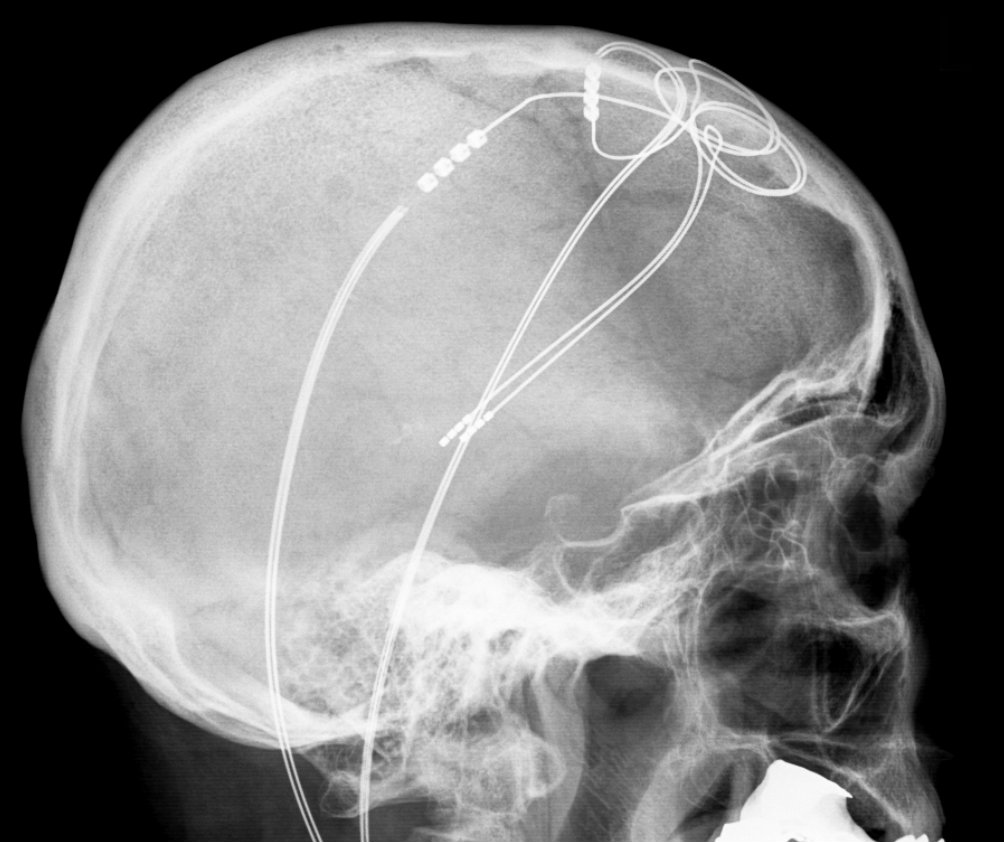
- Court: European Court of Justice
- Citations: (2001) C-157/99, [2001] ECR I-5473

Keywords
- Free movement of services

Geraets-Smits v Stichting Ziekenfonds and Peerbooms v Stichting CZ Groep Zorgverzekeringen (2001) C-157/99 is an EU law case, concerning the free movement of services in the European Union.

== Facts ==
Mrs Geraets-Smits was insured by a sickness insurance fund in Netherlands. She suffered from Parkinson's disease and received treatment in Germany. Her claim was denied on the grounds that the treatment available in Netherlands was adequate, and that the treatment in Germany did not give any additional advantage. Mr. Peerenbooms suffered a coma following a car accident and was treated at a specialized clinic in Austria. The treatment he received would have been available in Netherlands on an experimental basis, but he would not have qualified for the services. He was also refused reimbursement.

Netherlands social security legislation required prior approval for medical treatment from providers who did not have an agreement with the sickness insurance fund.

== Judgment ==
The Court of Justice held that while member states were free to organize their systems how they choose, they could not restrict medical services provided in other countries which were "tried and tested by international medical science". Authorization could, hjowever, be refused if the same or equivalent service could be obtained without "undue delay" from a provider who had a contract with the sickness insurance fund..

== See also ==
- European Union law
