= Geven v Land Nordrhein-Westfalen =

- Court: European Court of Justice
- Citation: (2007) C-213/05

Keywords
- Free movement of workers

Geven v Land Nordrhein-Westfalen (2007) C-213/05 is an EU law case concerning the free movement of workers in the European Union.

== Facts ==
A Dutch woman, Wendy Geven, residing in the Netherlands, doing minor employment in Germany, claimed the German child-raising allowance. German law required residence. Ms Geven claimed this violated her right to free movement under TFEU article 45.

== Judgment ==
The Court of Justice, Grand Chamber, held the German government could justify the indirect discrimination of a residence requirement to claim the child benefit. Justifications could include encouraging the birth rate, allowing parents to care for children themselves by giving up employment, and benefiting people who had ‘established a real link with German society.’

== See also ==
- European Union law
