= Trojani v Centre public d'aide sociale de Bruxelles =

Trojani v CPAS
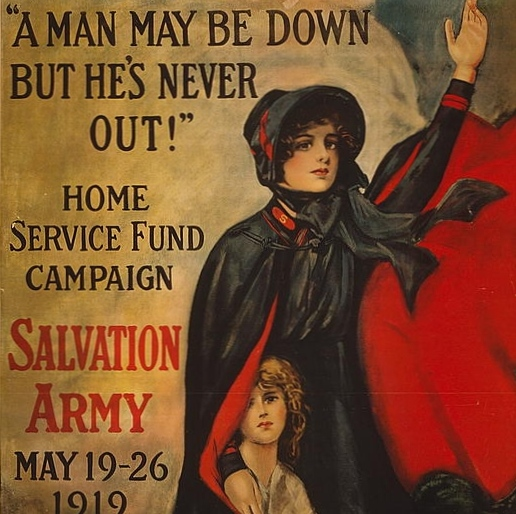
- Court: European Court of Justice
- Citations: (2004) C-456/02, [2004] ECR I-07573

Keywords
- Free movement of goods

Trojani v Centre public d'aide sociale de Bruxelles (2004) C-456/02 is an EU law case, concerning the free movement of persons and citizenship in the European Union.

== Facts ==
A Salvation Army volunteer claimed the minimex, the minimum subsistence allowance, from CPAS, the Centre public d'aide sociale de Bruxelles in Belgium. He was French and went to Belgium in 2000, staying at a campsite in Blankenberge and then the Jacques Brel youth hostel Brussels. He got accommodation at the Salvation Army hostel from January 2002. He got board, lodging, and pocket money for doing jobs for 30 hours a week, as part of a ‘personal socio-occupational reintegration programme'. CPAS refused because he was not Belgian, and said he could not benefit from the Free Movement of Workers Regulation 1612/68.

== Judgment ==
The Court of Justice, Grand Chamber, held that Mr Trojani would be protected as a worker.

16 Moreover, neither the sui generis nature of the employment relationship under national law, nor the level of productivity of the person concerned, the origin of the funds from which the remuneration is paid, or the limited amount of the remuneration can have any consequence regarding whether or not the person is a worker for Community law (see Case 53/81 Levin [1982] ECR 1035, paragraph 16; Case 344/87 Bettray [1989] ECR 1621, paragraphs 15 and 16; and Case C-188/00 Kurz [2002] ECR I-10691, paragraph 32).

20 In the present case, as is apparent from the decision-making reference, Mr Trojani performs, for the Salvation Army and under its direction, various jobs for approximately 30 hours a week, as part of a personal reintegration programme, in return for which he receives benefits in kind and some pocket money.

[...]

22 Having established that the benefits in kind and money provided by the Salvation Army to Mr Trojani constitute the consideration for the services performed by him for and under the direction of the hostel, the national court has thereby established the existence of the constituent elements of any paid employment relationship, namely subordination and the payment of remuneration.

== See also ==
- European Union law
