= Cartesio Oktató és Szolgáltató bt =

European company law case

- Court: European Court of Justice
- Citations: (2008) C-210/06, [2008] WLR (D) 400

Case opinions
- AG Maduro Opinion

Keywords
- Right of establishment

Cartesio Oktató és Szolgáltató bt (2008) C-210/06 is a European company law case concerning the right of freedom of establishment.

== Facts ==
A Hungarian limited partnership wished to transfer its operational headquarters to Italy, but stay subject to Hungarian law. The Hungarian Commercial Court refused to enter the new address in the companies register as it was not possible under Hungarian law. The European Court of Justice was sent a reference under TEC article 234 as to whether the company had a right to transfer its headquarters given TEC articles 43 and 48 (now TFEU articles 49 and 54).

== Judgment ==
The European Court of Justice held that without any applicable EU legislation, the question of whether a company formed under one member state's law could transfer its registered office to another without losing legal personality was a question of national law. The question of whether the company's right of freedom of establishment was restricted only arose under article 43 if it could be established that the company actually had a right to that freedom. This was determined by normal law. On the one hand a company seat change may result in changing applicable national law, and there a barrier to conversion was prohibited under TEC article 43 unless it is shown that the restriction is in the public interest. On the other hand, a company could wish, as here, to change its seat without changing national law, but that would be within the discretion of the national law in question.

In plain words, the press release issue by the European Court of Justice stated the following:

- The Member State of incorporation can prevent a company from transferring its seat to another Member State of the Union.

- On the other hand, the freedom of establishment enables a company to move to another Member State by converting itself into a form of company governed by the law of that State, without having to be wound up or enter into liquidation during its conversion, if the law of the host Member State so permits.

109 Consequently, in accordance with Article 48 EC, in the absence of a uniform Community law definition of the companies which may enjoy the right of establishment on the basis of a single connecting factor determining the national law applicable to a company, the question whether Article 43 EC applies to a company which seeks to rely on the fundamental freedom enshrined in that article – like the question whether a natural person is a national of a Member State, hence entitled to enjoy that freedom – is a preliminary matter which, as Community law now stands, can only be resolved by the applicable national law. In consequence, the question whether the company is faced with a restriction on the freedom of establishment, within the meaning of Article 43 EC, can arise only if it has been established, in the light of the conditions laid down in Article 48 EC, that the company actually has a right to that freedom.

110 Thus a Member State has the power to define both the connecting factor required of a company if it is to be regarded as incorporated under the law of that Member State and, as such, capable of enjoying the right of establishment, and that required if the company is to be able subsequently to maintain that status. That power includes the possibility for that Member State not to permit a company governed by its law to retain that status if the company intends to reorganise itself in another Member State by moving its seat to the territory of the latter, thereby breaking the connecting factor required under the national law of the Member State of incorporation.

111 Nevertheless, the situation where the seat of a company incorporated under the law of one Member State is transferred to another Member State with no change as regards the law which governs that company falls to be distinguished from the situation where a company governed by the law of one Member State moves to another Member State with an attendant change as regards the national law applicable, since in the latter situation the company is converted into a form of company which is governed by the law of the Member State to which it has moved.

== See also ==
- UK company law
- European company law
- Liggett v. Lee 288 U.S. 517 (1933)
