= Hendrix v Employee Insurance Institute =

- Court: European Court of Justice
- Full case name: Hendrix v Raad van Bestuur van het Uitvoeringsinstituut Werknemersverzekeringen
- Citation: (2007) C-287/05

Keywords
- Free movement of workers

Hendrix v Raad van Bestuur van het Uitvoeringsinstituut Werknemersverzekeringen (2007) C-287/05 is an EU law case, concerning the free movement of workers in the European Union.

== Facts ==
Mr Hendrix claimed he should still receive incapacity benefit after he moved from Netherlands to Belgium from the Dutch Board of Directors of the Employee Insurance Institute. He continued to work in the Netherlands. Young people in the Netherlands could get incapacity benefit. This was a non-contributory benefit, reserved for people residing in the Netherlands.

== Judgment ==
The Court of Justice, Grand Chamber, held that the incapacity benefit was a social advantage under Regulation 492/11. This was a rule specifically expressing the principle in TFEU article 45(2). This meant a residency requirement could be reviewed. In this case it was indirect discrimination, unless it could be justified. It could be justified on the facts.

54 It follows that the condition of residence attached to receipt of the benefit under the Wajong can be put forward against a person in the situation of Mr Hendrix only if it is objectively justified and proportionate to the objective pursued.

55 As the Court held in paragraph 33 of Kersbergen-Lap and Dams-Schipper, the Wajong benefit is closely linked to the socio-economic situation of the Member State concerned, since it is based on the minimum wage and standard of living in the Netherlands. Further, that benefit is one of the special non-contributory benefits referred to in Article 4(2a) in conjunction with Article 10a of Regulation No 1408/71, which the persons to whom that regulation applies receive exclusively within the territory of the Member State in which they reside and in accordance with the legislation of that State. It follows that the condition of residence as such, laid down in the national legislation, is objectively justified.

56 It is also necessary that the application of such a condition does not entail an infringement of the rights which a person in the situation of Mr Hendrix derives from freedom of movement for workers which goes beyond what is required to achieve the legitimate objective pursued by the national legislation.

57 From this point of view, it must be observed that the national legislation, as stated above in paragraph 15, expressly provides that the condition of residence may be waived when the condition leads to an ‘unacceptable degree of unfairness’. In accordance with settled case-law, it is the responsibility of national courts to interpret, so far as possible, national law in conformity with the requirements of Community law (Case C‑106/89 Marleasing [1990] ECR I‑4135, paragraph 8, and Joined Cases C‑397/01 to C-403/01 Pfeiffer and Others [2004] ECR I‑8835, paragraph 113). The referring court must therefore be satisfied, in the circumstances of this particular case, that the requirement of a condition of residence on national territory does not lead to such unfairness, taking into account the fact that Mr Hendrix has exercised his right of freedom of movement as a worker and that he has maintained economic and social links to the Netherlands.

== See also ==
- European Union law
