= Steymann v Staatssecretaris van Justitie =

Udo Steymann v Staatssecretaris van Justitie
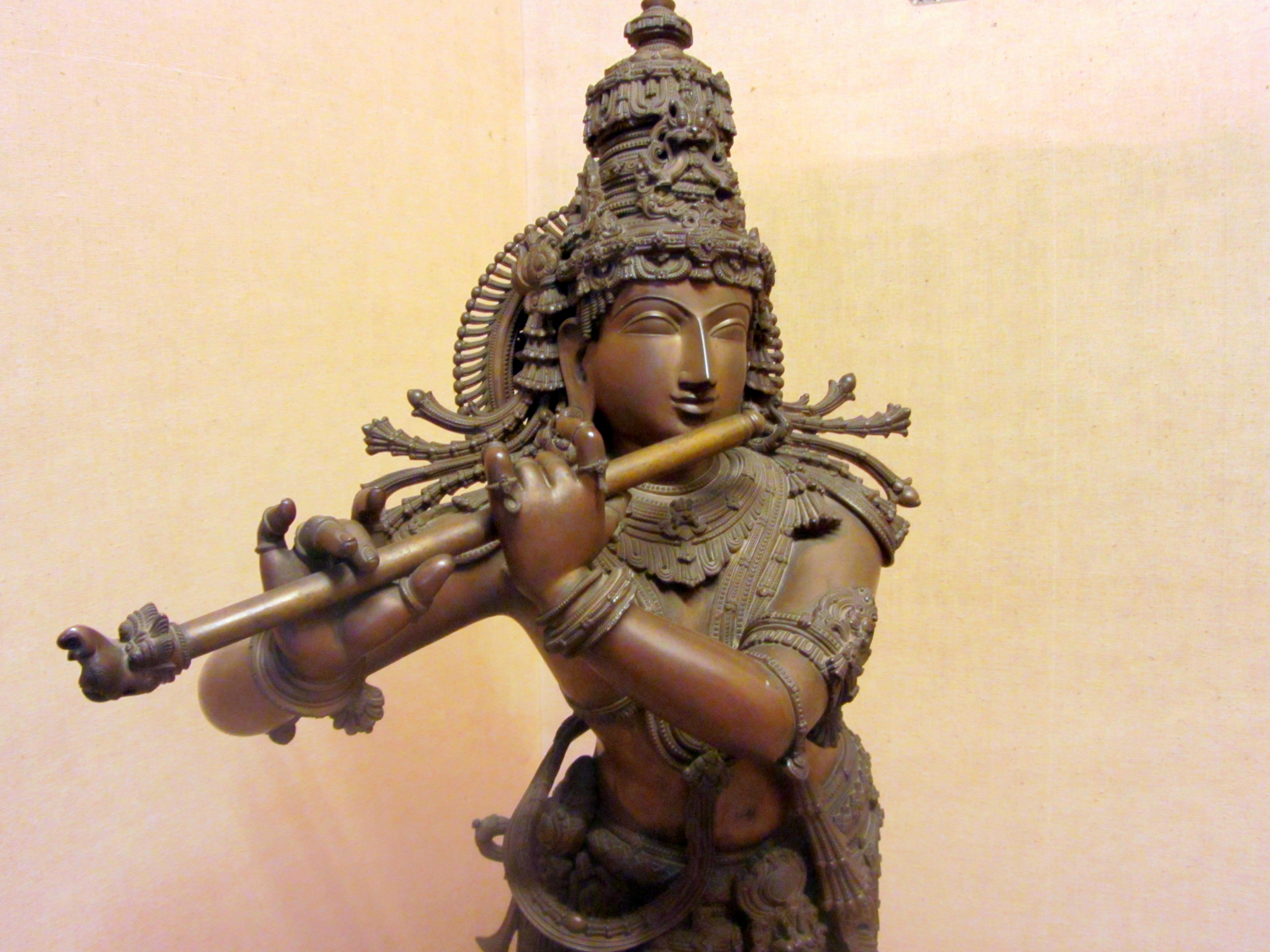
- Court: European Court of Justice
- Citation: (1988) Case 196/87, [1988] ECR 6159

Keywords
- Free movement of workers

Udo Steymann v Staatssecretaris van Justitie (1988) Case 196/87 is a European Union law case, concerning the free movement of workers in the European Union.

== Facts ==
Udo Steymann was a German plumber working in the Netherlands. He joined the Rajneesh movement, a religious group who provided for each other's material needs through commercial activity including running a discothèque, a bar, and a launderette. He participated in the community by doing plumbing, household duties, and other activities. The community would provide for people irrespective of the activities they undertook. He applied for residence to pursue the activity but was refused. When he appealed a reference was made to the European Court of Justice (ECJ).

== Judgment ==
The ECJ held that remuneration may be indirect “quid pro quo” rather than strict consideration for work i.e. work does not need to be paid for in money as long as the worker agrees to receive something else in return.

11 As regards the activities in question in this case, it appears from the documents before the Court that they consist of work carried out within and on behalf of the Bhagwan Community in connection with the Bhagwan Community' s commercial activities. It appears that such work plays a relatively important role in the way of life of the Bhagwan Community and that only in special circumstances can the members of the community avoid taking part therein. In turn, the Bhagwan Community provides for the material needs of its members, including pocket-money, irrespective of the nature and the extent of the work which they do.

12 In a case such as the one before the national court it is impossible to rule out a priori the possibility that work carried out by members of the community in question constitutes an economic activity within the meaning of Article 2 of the Treaty. In so far as the work, which aims to ensure a measure of self-sufficiency for the Bhagwan Community, constitutes an essential part of participation in that community, the services which the latter provides to its members may be regarded as being an indirect quid pro quo for their work.

13 However, it must be observed, as the Court held in its judgment of 23 March 1982 in Case 53/81 Levin v Staatssecretaris van Justitie (1982) ECR 1035, that the work must be genuine and effective and not such as to be regarded as purely marginal and ancillary. In this case the national court has held that the work was genuine and effective.

Under the Lawrie-Blum formula, the Court held that Steymann provided services of value to the community which, otherwise, would have had to be performed by another person who would have been paid; therefore, he qualified as a worker.

== See also ==
- European Union law
