= Sala v Freistaat Bayern =

- Court: European Court of Justice
- Citations: (1998) C-85/96, [1998] ECR I-2691

Keywords
- Free movement of citizens

Sala v Freistaat Bayern (1998) C-85/96 is an EU law case, concerning the free movement of citizens in the European Union.

== Facts ==
Maria Martinez Sala, a Spanish national, lived in Germany since 1968, age 12. She had various residence permits. They expired. She had applied for an extension. She had a baby in 1993 and applied for child allowance. She was turned down because she did not have German nationality, a residence entitlement, or a residence permit. If she had been working she would have got a benefit under Regulation 492/11 art 7(2).

== Judgment ==
The Court of Justice held that Ms Sala should have got the allowance, because it was discriminatory to require an EU citizen produce a residence permit which the national did not need to provide.

62 Article 8(2) of the Treaty attaches to the status of citizen of the Union the rights and duties laid down by the Treaty, including the right, laid down in Article 6 of the Treaty, not to suffer discrimination on grounds of nationality within the scope of application ratione materiae of the Treaty.

63 It follows that a citizen of the European Union, such as the appellant in the main proceedings, lawfully resident in the territory of the host Member State, can rely on Article 6 of the Treaty in all situations which fall within the scope ratione materiae of Community law, including the situation where that Member State delays or refuses to grant to that claimant a benefit that is provided to all persons lawfully resident in the territory of that State on the ground that the claimant is not in possession of a document which nationals of that same State are not required to have and the issue of which may be delayed or refused by the authorities of that State.

64 Since the unequal treatment in question thus comes within the scope of the Treaty, it cannot be considered to be justified: it is discrimination directly based on the appellant's nationality and, in any event, nothing to justify such unequal treatment has been put before the Court.

65 The answer to the fourth question must therefore be that Community law precludes a Member State from requiring nationals of other Member States authorised to reside in its territory to produce a formal residence permit issued by the national authorities in order to receive a child-raising allowance, whereas that Member State's own nationals are only required to be permanently or ordinarily resident in that Member State.

== See also ==
- European Union law
