= Konsumentombudsmannen v De Agostini =

EU law case

- Court: European Court of Justice
- Citation: (1997) C-34/95

Keywords
- Free movement of goods

Konsumentombudsmannen v De Agostini (1997) C-34/95 is an EU law case, concerning the free movement of goods in the European Union.

== Facts ==
Sweden banned TV ads directed at children under age 12, and banned misleading commercials for skin care products and detergents. The Swedish Consumer Ombudsman prosecuted one trader for a magazine called Everything You Need to Know about Dinosaurs, for children under 12. It prosecuted another for marketing a soap called "Body De Lite", in breach of the misleading ad rule.

== Judgment ==
The Court of Justice held that these were certain selling arrangements. While under Keck the measure applied universally to all traders in a territory, it did not necessarily affect all traders the same in law and fact. If the national court found an unequal burden in law or fact, it would be caught, and would then have to be justified under art 36 or a mandatory requirement.

36 According to De Agostini, TV-Shop and the Commission, the principle that broadcasts are to be controlled by the State having jurisdiction over the broadcaster would be seriously undermined in both its purpose and effect if the Directive were held to be inapplicable to advertisers. They argue that a restriction relating to advertising affects television broadcasts, even if the restriction concerns only advertising.

37 in response to that objection, it is sufficient to observe that Council Directive 84/450/EEC of 10 September 1984 relating to the approximation of the laws, regulations and administrative provisions of the Member States concerning misleading advertising (OJ 1984 L 250, p. 17), which provides in particular in Article 4(1) that Member States are to ensure that adequate and effective means exist for the control of misleading advertising in the interests of consumers as well as competitors and the general public, could be robbed of its substance in the field of television advertising if the receiving Member State were deprived of all possibility of adopting measures against an advertiser and that this would be in contradiction with the express intention of the Community legislature (see, to this effect, the judgment of the Court of the European Free Trade Association of 16 June 1995 in Joined Cases E-8/94 and E-9/94 Forbrukerombudet v Mattel Scandinavia and Lego Norge, Report of the EFTA Court, 1 January 1994 – 30 June 1995, 113, paragraphs 54 to 56 and paragraph 58).

38 It follows from the foregoing that the Directive does not preclude a Member State from taking, pursuant to general legislation on protection of consumers against misleading advertising, measures against an advertiser in relation to television advertising broadcast from another Member State, provided that those measures do not prevent the retransmission, as such, in its territory of television broadcasts coming from that other Member State.

As regards Article 30 of the Treaty

39 in paragraph 22 of its judgment in Leclerc-Siplec, cited above, the Court held that legislation which prohibits television advertising in a particular sector concerns selling arrangements for products belonging to that sector in that it prohibits a particular form of promotion of a particular method of marketing products.

40 in Joined Cases C-267/91 and C-268/91 Keck and Mithouard [1993] ECR I-6097, at paragraph 16, the Court held that national measures restricting or prohibiting certain selling arrangements are not covered by Article 30 of the Treaty, so long as they apply to all traders operating within the national territory and so long as they affect in the same manner, in law and in fact, the marketing of domestic products and of those from other Member States.

41 The first condition is clearly fulfilled in the cases before the national court.

42 As regards the second condition, it cannot be excluded that an outright ban, applying in one Member State, of a type of promotion for a product which is lawfully sold there might have a greater impact on products from other Member States.

43 Although the efficacy of the various types of promotion is a question of fact to be determined in principle by the referring court, it is to be noted that in its observations De Agostini stated that television advertising was the only effective form of promotion enabling it to penetrate the Swedish market since it had no other advertising methods for reaching children and their parents.

44 Consequently, an outright ban on advertising aimed at children less than 12 years of age and of misleading advertising, as provided for by the Swedish legislation, is not covered by Article 30 of the Treaty, unless it is shown that the ban does not affect in the same way, in fact and in law, the marketing of national products and of products from other Member States.

45 in the latter case, it is for the national court to determine whether the ban is necessary to satisfy overriding requirements of general public importance or one of the aims listed in Article 36 of the EC Treaty if it is proportionate to that purpose and if those aims or requirements could not have been attained or fulfilled by measures less restrictive of intra-Community trade.

46 Further, according to settled case-law, fair trading and the protection of consumers in general are overriding requirements of general public importance which may justify obstacles to the free movement of goods (Case 120/78 Rewe v Bundesmonopolverwaltung für Branntwein (Cassis de Dijon) [1979] ECR 649, paragraph 8).

47 Consequently, the answer to the question must be that, on a proper construction of Article 30 of the Treaty, a Member State is not precluded from taking, on the basis of provisions of its domestic legislation, measures against an advertiser in relation to television advertising, provided that those provisions affect in the same way, in law and in fact, the marketing of domestic products and of those from other Member States, are necessary for meeting overriding requirements of general public importance or one of the aims laid down in Article 36 of the Treaty, are proportionate for that purpose, and those aims or overriding requirements could not be met by measures less restrictive of intra-Community trade.

== See also ==
- European Union law
- 44 Liquormart, Inc. v. Rhode Island, 517 US 484 (1996)
