= Finanzamt Köln Altstadt v Schumacker =

- Court: European Court of Justice
- Citation: (1995) C-279/93

Keywords
- Free movement of workers

Finanzamt Köln Altstadt v Schumacker (1995) C-279/93 is an EU law case, concerning the free movement of workers in the European Union.

== Facts ==
Roland Schumacker argued that he should get extra tax benefits in Germany. He was Belgian, lived in Belgium and worked in Germany. He paid German income tax, but was denied benefits that resident taxpayers received. Germany argued that it was hard to determine the income received by non-residents in their state of residence to assess deductions.

== Judgment ==
The Court of Justice held that a non-resident taxpayer who receives almost all income in a state of employment is objectively comparable to someone who does the same work there. It followed that Schumacker should be entitled to the tax benefits.

27 It is true that the rules at issue in the main proceedings apply irrespective of the nationality of the taxpayer concerned.

28 However, national rules of that kind, under which a distinction is drawn on the basis of residence in that non-residents are denied certain benefits which are, conversely, granted to persons residing within national territory, are liable to operate mainly to the detriment of nationals of other Member States. Non-residents are in the majority of cases foreigners.

29 In those circumstances, tax benefits granted only to residents of a Member State may constitute indirect discrimination by reason of nationality.

[...]

38 In the case of a non-resident who receives the major part of his income and almost all his family income in a Member State other than that of his residence, discrimination arises from the fact that his personal and family circumstances are taken into account neither in the State of residence nor in the State of employment.

39 The further question arises whether there is any justification for such discrimination.

[...]

41 ... In a situation such as that in the main proceedings, the State of residence cannot take account of the taxpayer' s personal and family circumstances because the tax payable there is insufficient to enable it to do so. Where that is the case, the Community principle of equal treatment requires that, in the State of employment, the personal and family circumstances of a foreign non-resident be taken into account in the same way as those of resident nationals and that the same tax benefits should be granted to him.

42 The distinction at issue in the main proceedings is thus in no way justified by the need to ensure the cohesion of the applicable tax system.

43 At the hearing, the Finanzamt argued that administrative difficulties prevent the State of employment from ascertaining the income which non-residents working in its territory receive in their State of residence.

44 That argument likewise cannot be upheld.

45 Council Directive 77/799/EEC of 19 December 1977 concerning mutual assistance by the competent authorities of the Member States in the field of direct taxation (OJ 1977 L 336, p. 15) provides for ways of obtaining information comparable to those existing between tax authorities at national level. There is thus no administrative obstacle to account being taken in the State of employment of a non-resident' s personal and family circumstances.

== See also ==
- European Union law
