= Dano v Jobcenter Leipzig =

ECJ decision

- Court: European Court of Justice
- Citation: (2014) C‑333/13

Keywords
- Free movement of citizens

Dano v Jobcenter Leipzig (2014) C‑333/13 is an EU law case, concerning the free movement of citizens in the European Union.

== Facts ==
Ms Dano and her son Florin, Romanian nationals, claimed an entitlement to unemployment benefits at the Leipzig Social Court, after being denied by the Jobcenter Leipzig. She was not seeking employment, had no training and had not worked in Germany or Romania before, but had lived in Germany since November 2010 at her sister's home. Ms Dano received €184 per month in child benefits and €133 per month for maintenance payments. The German law on Grundsicherung denied help to people who enter purely for social assistance or while searching for employment. The Social Code Book II (Sozialgesetzbuch II) said a person must be ‘capable of earning a living’ although the code as a whole was ‘to enable the beneficiaries to lead a life in keeping with human dignity’. It excluded ‘foreign nationals whose right of residence arises solely out of the search for employment and their family members’.

== Judgment ==
=== Advocate General Opinion ===
AG Wathelet advised that Ms Dano should not be entitled to social assistance. 131. ‘It serves to prevent persons exercising their right to free movement without intending to integrate themselves from becoming a burden on the social assistance system... In other words, it serves to prevent abuse and a certain form of ‘benefit tourism’.’

=== Court of Justice ===
The Grand Chamber of the Court of Justice held Ms Dano did not have sufficient resources and could not claim a right of residence in Germany. Therefore, they could not invoke the principle of non-discrimination in the Directive and Regulation. The Citizens Rights Directive article 24(2) did not require granting social assistance in the first three months of residence. The right to equal treatment depends on ‘residing on the basis of this Directive’. Under article 7(1)(b) that requires one to ‘have sufficient resources for themselves and their family members not to become a burden on the social assistance system’. For residence between three months and five years, economically inactive persons should have sufficient resources of their own to prevent a host member state's welfare system being used as a means of subsistence. A member state should be able to refuse social assistance to economically inactive citizens. Domestic law can exclude migrants from ‘special non-contributory cash benefits’ although they are granted to nationals of the host member state who are in the same situation. The Charter of Fundamental Rights of the European Union (CFR) did not apply, because when member states put conditions on benefits and their extent, they are not implementing EU law.

== See also ==
- European Union law
