= Treaty on the Functioning of the European Union =

1957 treaty of the European Union

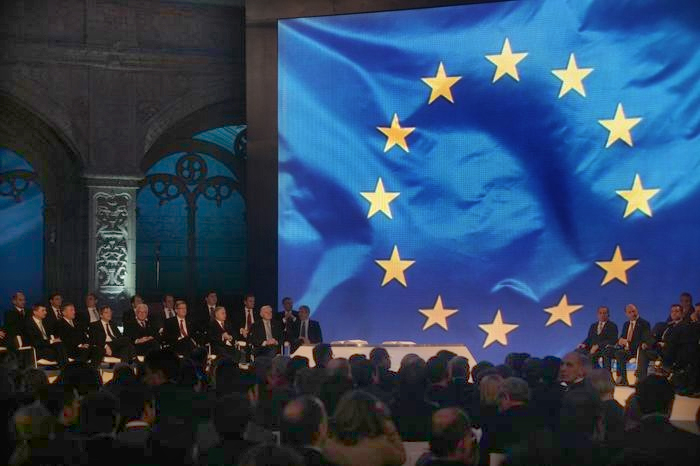
- The signing ceremony of the Treaty of Lisbon on 13 December 2007 which gave the TFEU its current name
- Type: Founding treaty
- Location: Capitoline Hill in Rome, Italy
- Effective: 1 January 1958 (1 December 2009 under its current name)
- Parties: EU member states
- Depositary: Government of Italy

Full text
- Consolidated version of the Treaty on the Functioning of the European Union at Wikisource

The Treaty on the Functioning of the European Union (TFEU) is one of two treaties forming the constitutional basis of the European Union (EU), the other being the Treaty on European Union (TEU). It was previously known as the Treaty Establishing the European Community (TEC).

The Treaty originated as the Treaty of Rome (fully the Treaty establishing the European Economic Community), which brought about the creation of the European Economic Community (EEC), the best-known of the European Communities (EC). It was signed on 25 March 1957 by Belgium, France, Italy, Luxembourg, the Netherlands and West Germany and came into force on 1 January 1958. It remains one of the two most important treaties in the modern-day European Union (EU).

Its name has been amended twice since 1957. The Maastricht Treaty of 1992 removed the word "economic" from the Treaty of Rome's official title and, in 2009, the Treaty of Lisbon renamed it the "Treaty on the Functioning of the European Union".

Following the 2005 referendums, which saw the failed attempt at launching a European Constitution, on 13 December 2007 the Lisbon Treaty was signed. This saw the 'TEC' renamed as the Treaty on the Functioning of the European Union (TFEU) and, once again, renumbered. The Lisbon reforms resulted in the merging of the three pillars into the reformed European Union.

In March 2011, the European Council adopted a decision to amend the Treaty by adding a new paragraph to Article 136. The additional paragraph, which enables the establishment of a financial stability mechanism for the eurozone, runs as follows:

The Member States whose currency is the euro may establish a stability mechanism to be activated if indispensable to safeguard the stability of the euro area as a whole. The granting of any required financial assistance under the mechanism will be made subject to strict conditionality.

== Provisions ==
The consolidated TFEU consists of seven parts:

=== Part 1: Principles ===
In principles, article 1 establishes the basis of the treaty and its legal value. Articles 2 to 6 outline the competencies of the EU according to the level of powers accorded in each area. Articles 7 to 14 set out social principles, articles 15 and 16 set out public access to documents and meetings and article 17 states that the EU shall respect the status of religious, philosophical and non-confessional organisations under national law.

=== Part 2: Non-discrimination and citizenship of the Union ===
The second part begins with article 18 which outlaws, within the limitations of the treaties, discrimination on the basis of nationality. Article 19 states the council with the consent of the European Parliament "may take appropriate action to combat discrimination based on sex, racial or ethnic origin, religion or belief, disability, age or sexual orientation". Articles 20 to 24 establishes EU citizenship and accords rights to it; to free movement, consular protection from other states, vote and stand in local and European elections, right to petition Parliament and the European Ombudsman and to contact and receive a reply from EU institutions in their own language. Article 25 requires the Commission to report on the implementation of these rights every three years.

=== Part 3: Union policies and internal actions ===
Part 3 is the largest in the TFEU. Articles 26 to 197 concern the substantive policies and actions of the EU.

==== Title II: Free movement of goods ====
Including the customs union

==== Title III: Agriculture and Fisheries ====
Common Agricultural Policy and Common Fisheries Policy

==== Title IV: Free movement of workers, services and capital ====
Title IV concerns free movement of people, services and capital:

- Chapter 1: Workers (articles 45–48, ex articles 39–42 TEC), including the right to move freely in order to "accept [an] offer of employment actually made
- Chapter 2: Right of Establishment (articles 49–55), including the right to take up and pursue activities as [a] self-employed person
- Chapter 3: Services (articles 56–62)
- Chapter 4: Capital and Payments (articles 63–66), including free movement of "capital between member states and between member states and third countries".

==== Title V: Area of freedom, justice and security ====
Including police and justice co-operation

==== Title VII: Common Rules on Competition, Taxation and Approximation of Laws ====
European Union competition law, taxation and harmonisation of regulations (note Article 101 and Article 102)

==== Title VIII: Economic and monetary policy ====
Articles 119 to 144 concern economic and monetary policy, including articles on the euro. Chapter 1: Economic policy - Article 122 deals with unforeseen problems in the supply chain and "severe difficulties caused by natural disasters or exceptional occurrences beyond its control" Chapter 1: Economic policy – Article 126 deals with how excessive member state debt is handled. Chapter 2: Monetary policy – Article 127 outlines that the European System of Central Banks should maintain price stability and work with the principles of an open markets and free competition. The Article 140 describes the criteria for inclusion in monetary union (the euro) or having exception from it, and also says that it is a majority of the council, not the state alone, which decides upon usage of euro or national currency. Thereby are states obliged (except UK and Denmark) to introduce the euro if the council finds they fulfil the criteria.

==== Titles IX to XV: Employment, social and consumer policy ====
Title IX concerns employment policy, under articles 145–150. Title X concerns social policy, and with reference to the European Social Charter 1961 and the Community Charter of the Fundamental Social Rights of Workers 1989. This gives rise to the weight of European labour law.

Title XI establishes the European Social Fund under articles 162–164. Title XII, articles 165 and 166 concern education, vocational training, youth and sport policies. Title XIII concerns culture, in article 167. Title XIV allows measures for public health, under article 168. Title XV empowers the EU to act for consumer protection, in article 169.

==== Titles XVI to XXIV: Networks, industry, environment, energy, other ====
Title XVI, articles 170–172 empower action to develop and integrate Trans-European Networks. Title XVII, article 173, regards the EU's industrial policy, to promote industry. Title XVIII, articles 174 to 178 concern economic, social and territorial cohesion (reducing disparities in development). Title XIX concerns research and development and space policy, under which the European Research Area and European Space Policy are developed.

Title XX concerns the increasingly important environmental policy, allowing action under articles 191 to 193. Title XXI, article 194, establishes the Energy policy of the European Union.

Title XXII, article 195 is tourism. Title XXIII, article 196 is civil protection. Title XXIV, article 197 is administrative co-operation.

=== Part 4: Association of the overseas countries and territories ===
Part 4, in articles 198 to 204, deals with association of overseas territories. Article 198 sets the objective of association as promoting the economic and social development of those associated territories as listed in annexe 2. The following articles elaborate on the form of association such as customs duties.

=== Part 5: External action by the Union ===
Part 5, in articles 205 to 222, deals with EU foreign policy. Article 205 states that external actions must be in accordance with the principles laid out in Chapter 1 Title 5 of the Treaty on European Union. Article 206 and 207 establish the common commercial (external trade) policy of the EU. Articles 208 to 214 deal with co-operation on development and humanitarian aid for third countries. Article 215 deals with sanctions while articles 216 to 219 deal with procedures for establishing international treaties with third countries. Article 220 instructs the High Representative and Commission to engage in appropriate co-operation with other international organisations and article 221 establishes the EU delegations. Article 222, the Solidarity clause states that members shall come to the aid of a fellow member who is subject to a terrorist attack, natural disaster or man-made disaster. This includes the use of military force.

=== Part 6: Institutional and financial provisions ===
Part 6, in articles 223 to 334, elaborates on the institutional provisions in the Treaty on European Union. As well as elaborating on the structures, articles 288 to 299 outline the forms of legislative acts and procedures of the EU. Articles 300 to 309 establish the European Economic and Social Committee, the Committee of the Regions and the European Investment Bank. Articles 310 to 325 outline the EU budget. Finally, articles 326 to 334 establishes provision for enhanced co-operation.

=== Part 7: General and final provisions ===
Part 7, in articles 335 to 358, deals with final legal points, such as territorial and temporal application, the seat of institutions (to be decided by member states, but this is enacted by a protocol attached to the treaties), immunities and the effect on treaties signed before 1958 or the date of accession.

== See also ==
- Berlin Declaration (2007)
- Four Freedoms (European Union)
