= Bosman ruling =

1995 European Court of Justice decision

- European Court of Justice

Submitted 6 October 1993 Decided 15 December 1995
- Full case name: Union royale belge des sociétés de football association ASBL v Jean-Marc Bosman, Royal club liégeois SA v Jean-Marc Bosman and others and Union des associations européennes de football (UEFA) v Jean-Marc Bosman
- Case: C-415/93
- CelexID: 61993CJ0415
- ECLI: ECLI:EU:C:1995:463
- Case type: Reference for a preliminary ruling
- Chamber: Full chamber
- Nationality of parties: Belgium
- Procedural history: Cour d'appel de Liège, 9e chambre civile, arrêt du 1 October 1993 (29.426/92)

Court composition
- President; Gil Carlos Rodríguez Iglesias
- Judge Rapporteur; G. Federico Mancini
- Judges: C.N. Kakouris; D.A.O. Edward; G. Hirsch; J.C. Moitinho de Almeida; P.J.G. Kapteyn; C. Gulmann; J.L. Murray; P. Jann; H. Ragnemalm
- Advocate General; Carl Otto Lenz

Legislation affecting
- Interprets Article 48, TEEC

Union Royale Belge des Sociétés de Football Association ASBL v Jean-Marc Bosman (1995) C-415/93 (known as the Bosman ruling) is a 1995 European Court of Justice decision concerning freedom of movement for workers, freedom of association, and direct effect of article 39 (now article 45 of the Treaty on the Functioning of the European Union) of the Treaty of Rome.

The case was an important decision on the free movement of labour and had a profound effect on the transfers of footballers —and by extension players of other professional sports— within the European Union (EU).

The decision banned quota restrictions on foreign EU players within national leagues, and allowed players in the EU to move to another club at the end of a contract (free agency) without a transfer fee being paid and without the approval of the previous club.

The ruling was made in a consolidation of three separate legal cases, all involving Belgian player Jean-Marc Bosman:

- Belgian Football Association v Jean-Marc Bosman
- R.F.C. de Liège v Jean-Marc Bosman and others
- UEFA v Jean-Marc Bosman

== Facts ==
Jean-Marc Bosman was a player for RFC Liège in the Belgian First Division whose contract had expired in 1990. He wanted to change teams and move to Dunkerque, a French club. However, Dunkerque refused to meet his Belgian club's transfer fee demand, so Liège refused to release Bosman.

In the meantime, Bosman's wages were reduced by 70% as he was no longer a first-team player. He took his case to the European Court of Justice in Luxembourg and sued for restraint of trade, citing FIFA's rules regarding football, specifically Article 17.

== Judgment ==
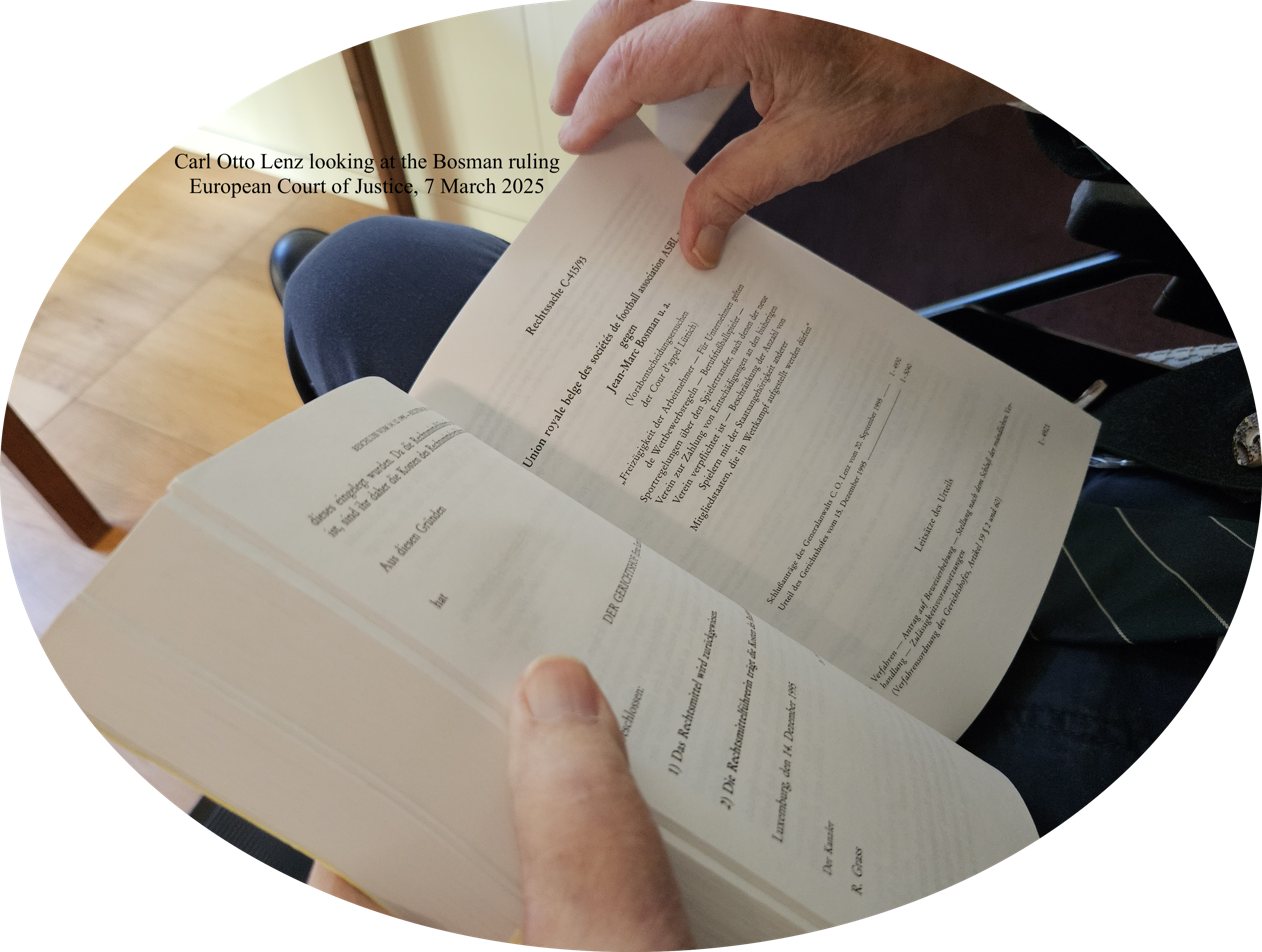
Carl Otto Lenz looking at the Bosman ruling - European Court of Justice, 7 March 2025

On 15 December 1995, the court ruled the system, as it was constituted, placed a restriction on the free movement of workers and was prohibited by Article 39(1) of the EC Treaty (now Article 45 (1) of the Treaty on the functioning of the European Union). Bosman and all other EU footballers were given the right to a free transfer at the expiration of their contracts, provided that they transfer from a club within one EU association to a club within another EU association.

94. The provisions of the Treaty relating to freedom of movement for persons are intended to facilitate the pursuit by Community citizens of occupational activities of all kinds throughout the Community, and preclude measures which might place Community citizens at a disadvantage when they wish to pursue an economic activity in the territory of another Member State (see Case 143/87 Stanton v INASTI [1988] ECR 3877, paragraph 13, and Case C-370/90 The Queen v Immigration Appeal Tribunal and Surinder Singh [1992] ECR I-4265, paragraph 16).

95. In that context, nationals of Member States have in particular the right, which they derive directly from the Treaty, to leave their country of origin to enter the territory of another Member State and reside there in order there to pursue an economic activity (see, inter alia, Case C-363/89 Roux v Belgium [1991] ECR I-273, paragraph 9, and Singh, cited above, paragraph 17).

96. Provisions which preclude or deter a national of a Member State from leaving his country of origin in order to exercise his right to freedom of movement therefore constitute an obstacle to that freedom even if they apply without regard to the nationality of the workers concerned (see also Case C-10/90 Masgio v Bundesknappschaft [1991] ECR I-1119, paragraphs 18 and 19).

97. The Court has also stated, in Case 81/87 The Queen v HM Treasury and Commissioners of Inland Revenue ex parte Daily Mail and General Trust plc [1988] ECR 5483, paragraph 16, that even though the Treaty provisions relating to freedom of establishment are directed mainly to ensuring that foreign nationals and companies are treated in the host Member State in the same way as nationals of that State, they also prohibit the Member State of origin from hindering the establishment in another Member State of one of its nationals or of a company incorporated under its legislation which comes within the definition contained in Article 58. The rights guaranteed by Article 52 et seq. of the Treaty would be rendered meaningless if the Member State of origin could prohibit undertakings from leaving in order to establish themselves in another Member State. The same considerations apply, in relation to Article 48 of the Treaty, with regard to rules which impede the freedom of movement of nationals of one Member State wishing to engage in gainful employment in another Member State.

98. It is true that the transfer rules in issue in the main proceedings apply also to transfers of players between clubs belonging to different national associations within the same Member State and that similar rules govern transfers between clubs belonging to the same national association.

99. However, as has been pointed out by Mr Bosman, by the Danish Government and by the Advocate General in points 209 and 210 of his Opinion, those rules are likely to restrict the freedom of movement of players who wish to pursue their activity in another Member State by preventing or deterring them from leaving the clubs to which they belong even after the expiry of their contracts of employment with those clubs.

100. Since they provide that a professional footballer may not pursue his activity with a new club established in another Member State unless it has paid his former club a transfer fee agreed upon between the two clubs or determined in accordance with the regulations of the sporting associations, the said rules constitute an obstacle to freedom of movement for workers.

101. As the national court has rightly pointed out, that finding is not affected by the fact that the transfer rules adopted by UEFA in 1990 stipulate that the business relationship between the two clubs is to exert no influence on the activity of the player, who is to be free to play for his new club. The new club must still pay the fee in issue, under pain of penalties which may include its being struck off for debt, which prevents it just as effectively from signing up a player from a club in another Member State without paying that fee.

102. Nor is that conclusion negated by the case-law of the Court cited by URBSFA and UEFA, to the effect that Article 30 of the Treaty does not apply to measures which restrict or prohibit certain selling arrangements so long as they apply to all relevant traders operating within the national territory and so long as they affect in the same manner, in law and in fact, the marketing of domestic products and of those from other Member States (see Joined Cases C-267/91 and C-268/91 Keck and Mithouard [1993] ECR I-6097, paragraph 16).

103. It is sufficient to note that, although the rules in issue in the main proceedings apply also to transfers between clubs belonging to different national associations within the same Member State and are similar to those governing transfers between clubs belonging to the same national association, they still directly affect players'access to the employment market in other Member States and are thus capable of impeding freedom of movement for workers. They cannot, thus, be deemed comparable to the rules on selling arrangements for goods which in Keck and Mithouard were held to fall outside the ambit of Article 30 of the Treaty (see also, with regard to freedom to provide services, Case C-384/93 Alpine Investments v Minister van Financiën [1995] ECR I-1141, paragraphs 36 to 38).

104. Consequently, the transfer rules constitute an obstacle to freedom of movement for workers prohibited in principle by Article 48 of the Treaty. It could only be otherwise if those rules pursued a legitimate aim compatible with the Treaty and were justified by pressing reasons of public interest. But even if that were so, application of those rules would still have to be such as to ensure achievement of the aim in question and not go beyond what is necessary for that purpose (see, inter alia, the judgment in Kraus, cited above, paragraph 32, and Case C-55/94 Gebhard [1995] ECR I-0000, paragraph 37).

== Significance to football ==
Prior to the Bosman ruling, professional clubs in some parts of Europe (but not, for example, in Spain and France) were able to prevent players from joining a club in another country even if their contracts had expired. In the United Kingdom, Transfer Tribunals had been in place since 1981 to resolve disputes over fees between clubs when transferring players at the end of their contracts. The Bosman ruling meant that players could move to a new club at the end of their contract without their old club receiving a fee. Players can now agree to a pre-contract with another club for a free transfer if the players' contract with their existing club has six months or less remaining.

The Bosman ruling also prohibited domestic football leagues in EU member states, and also UEFA, from imposing quotas on foreign players to the extent that they discriminated against nationals of EU states. At that time, many leagues placed quotas restricting the number of foreign nationals allowed on member teams. Also, UEFA had a rule that prohibited teams in its competitions, namely the Champions League, Cup Winners' Cup and UEFA Cup, from naming more than three "foreign" players in their squads for any game. After the ruling, quotas could still be imposed, but only used to restrict the number of non-EU players on each team.

According to a 2021 study, the Bosman ruling increased the competitiveness of national team football because it encouraged greater talent development. However, it reduced competition in the Champions League, as non-established teams tended to sell their best players rather than compete against the best teams. The ruling also affected football in other continents, as the foreign slots would be filled by non-EU players, allowing teams to obtain more South American, African and Asian players.

=== Players ===
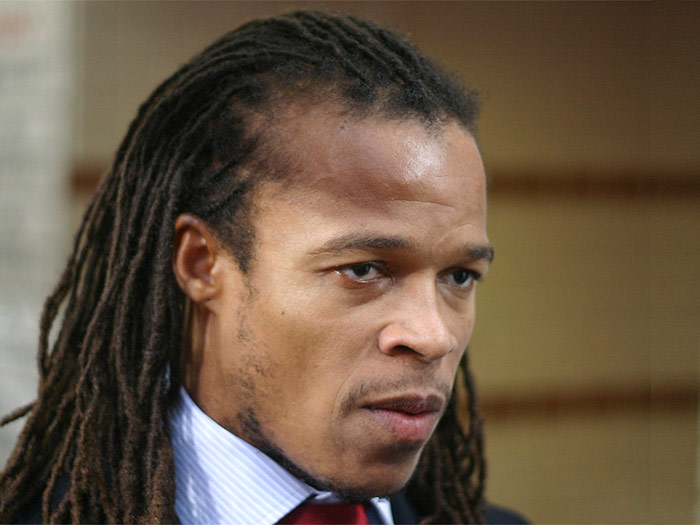
Edgar Davids was the first European high-profile player to benefit from the Bosman ruling, in 1996.

Since the ruling came into effect throughout the EU in 1995, several notable players in European football have benefited from the ruling. In 1996, Edgar Davids became Europe's first high-profile player to benefit from the ruling when he moved from Ajax to Milan. Ex-Hibernian player Paul Kane became the first UK Bosman transfer, moving from Aberdeen to Norwegian side Viking Stavanger in 1996. In 1999, Steve McManaman became the most lucrative transfer at the time in British football, as "Britain's first high-profile Bosman departure", when he moved from Liverpool to Real Madrid and the deal resulted in McManaman becoming the highest paid British player in history, from 1999 to 2001. Since Davids and McManaman, scores of other notable players became able to negotiate deals according to their market value when their contracts expired, a trend that continued into the 2000s and to this day.

A 2026 study by Finalarm and DataPulse Research examined the squads of all 48 nations at the 2026 World Cup and, to measure change over time, the 14 nations that have qualified for nearly every World Cup since 1990 (Argentina, Belgium, Brazil, England, France, Germany, Italy, Mexico, Netherlands, Portugal, Sweden, Spain, South Korea, USA). Among those 14 regular participants, the share of squad players under contract at foreign clubs rose from 26% in 1990 to 72% in 2026, and across Europe's top five leagues the share of foreign players rose from 23% in 1990 to 71% in 2025. Across all 48 nations at the 2026 tournament, country-level variation was wide: among major footballing nations Switzerland and Argentina had the highest shares (both 92%), ahead of Brazil (73%), while several smaller nations (including Senegal, Uruguay and Ivory Coast) fielded squads made up entirely of players based abroad. England had the lowest share among established footballing nations at 19%, a figure attributed in part to the post-Brexit tightening of work-permit rules for EU players in the Premier League.

=== Clubs ===
The ruling meant that clubs could no longer block a move or demand a fee, from the player or from the destination club, if the player left at the end of their contracts.

The Bosman ruling coincided directly with a new era of financial gains in football. In 2005, UEFA declared it was seeking to repair aspects of the ruling because it was believed to be the cause of the increasing rich-poor gap between elite and smaller clubs.

== Significance in EU law ==
Bosman confirmed the "rule of reason" approach of the courts used in the important Cassis de Dijon case as not only suitable for issues relating to movement of goods within the EU, but also for cases concerning the free movement of workers.

If free movement is indistinctly applied (i.e. not just against foreign nationals) it could be justified if...

1. The measures used were in pursuit of a legitimate aim
2. That aim was justified by pressing reasons of public interest

The case also alludes to the fact that Alpine Investments v Minister van Financiën provides a similar test for services, and Gebhard v Consiglio dell'Ordine degli Avvocati e Procuratori di Milano for establishment.

=== Other cases ===
The Bosman ruling was considered and distinguished in Lehtonen (2000), a similar case which involved a deadline imposed by FIBA after which basketball teams could not include players who had played for another team in the same season, where it was found that such a restriction was lawful.

== See also ==
- Retain and transfer system
- Free agent
- Kingaby v Aston Villa, a similar 1912 court case in England
- Eastham v Newcastle United, a similar 1963 court case in England
- Seitz decision, a similar 1975 arbitration case in the North American Major League Baseball
- Kolpak ruling, which extended Bosman to countries with an associate trading relationship with the EU, most notably the ACP countries
- Webster ruling, a post-Bosman ruling which formalised the 'buy-out' rules for disputed transfers of players still within their contract term
- 6+5 rule
- Meca-Medina ruling, the ruling that finally decided whether all sports federations and national leagues were obligated to follow the EU laws
- Reserve clause, for similar cases in North America
