= Commission v Italy =

Commission v Italy may refer to:

- In Commission v Italy (1968), Italy was not allowed to tax the export of art treasures. This case was important because it helped define the meaning of the word "goods" under European Law.
- In Commission v Italy (1972), Italy failed to enforce EU Dairy Regulations on time.
- In Commission v Italy (2003), Italy had wrongly limited the use of the word "chocolate" to products without vegetable fat.
- In Commission v Italy (2009), Italy wrongly banned motorcycles and mopeds from pulling trailers, which affected imported goods because Italian manufacturers didn't make such goods.
- In Commission v Italy (2011), Italy could not require lawyers to abide by maximum tariffs, unless the client agreed, because this discouraged lawyers from other Member States from moving to Italy.

== See also ==
- Commission v France
- Commission v Germany
- Commission v Hungary
- Commission v Ireland
- Commission v United Kingdom
