= Ker-Optika bt v ÀNTSZ Dél- dunántúli Regionális Intézete =

European Union law case

Ker-Optika
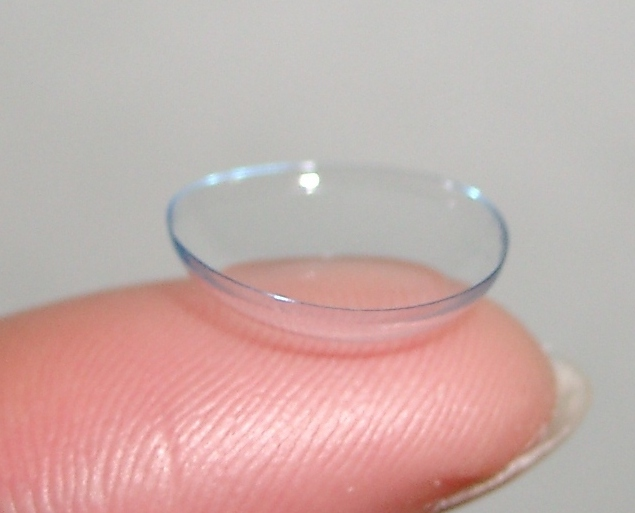
- Court: Baranya Megyei Bíróság
- Citation: [2010] ECR I-12213, Case C-108/09.

Keywords
- European Union law Free movement of goods Internal measures Selling arrangements Discrimination test Market access test

Ker-Optika bt v ÀNTSZ Dél-dunántúli Regionális Intézete [2010] ECR, Case C-108/09 is an EU law case concerning a conflict of law between Hungarian national legislation and European Union law. The Hungarian legislation regarding the online sale of contact lenses was considered with regards to whether it was necessary for the protection of public health, and it was concluded that this could have been done by less restrictive measures. Despite the internal measure in this case being categorised as a selling arrangement, which would generally be determined by the discrimination test established in Keck, the Court went on to use a market access test, as per Italian Trailers. Thus, this case is crucial in the recent development of the tests for determining measures equaling equivalent effect.

== Facts ==
Hungarian legislation prohibits the selling of contact lenses without a specialist shop to fit certain requirements and the services of an optometrist or an ophthalmologist qualified in the field of contact lenses. Ker-Optika, a Hungarian firm, sells contact lenses via its website. The Hungarian health authorities prohibited it from pursuing such activity as such products could not be sold via the internet.

Ker-Optika brought a court action challenging that prohibition. The Baranya Megyei Bíróság (the district court of Baranya, Hungary), which heard the case, asked the Court of Justice whether EU law precludes the Hungarian legislation which prohibits the selling of contact lenses via the Internet.

== Judgment ==
This article incorporates text available under the CC BY 4.0 license.

The Court of Justice held that the Hungarian law was not compatible with article 34 TFEU, because less restrictive measures could have been implemented to protect public health.

1. This reference for a preliminary ruling concerns the interpretation of Directive 2000/31/EC of the European Parliament and of the Council of 8 June 2000 on certain legal aspects of information society services, in particular electronic commerce, in the Internal Market (‘Directive on electronic commerce’) (OJ 2000 L 178, p. 1) and of Articles 34 TFEU and 36 TFEU.

2. The reference has been made in proceedings between Ker-Optika bt (‘Ker-Optika’) and ÀNTSZ Dél-dunántúli Regionális Intézete (South Transdanubian Regional Directorate of the national public health and medical services; ‘ÀNTSZ’) concerning an administrative decision whereby ÀNTSZ prohibited Ker-Optika from selling contact lenses via the Internet.

Whether there is a restriction on the free movement of goods

47. According to settled case-law, all trading rules enacted by Member States which are capable of hindering, directly or indirectly, actually or potentially, trade within the European Union are to be considered as measures having an effect equivalent to quantitative restrictions and are, on that basis, prohibited by Article 34 TFEU (see, inter alia, Case 8/74 Dassonville [1974] ECR 837, paragraph 5, and Case C‑110/05 Commission v Italy [2009] ECR I‑519, paragraph 33).

48. It is also apparent from settled case-law that Article 34 TFEU reflects the obligation to comply with the principles of non-discrimination and of mutual recognition of products lawfully manufactured and marketed in other Member States, as well as the principle of ensuring free access of EU products to national markets (see Commission v Italy, paragraph 34 and the case‑law cited).

49. Accordingly, measures adopted by a Member State the object or effect of which is to treat products coming from other Member States less favourably are to be regarded as measures having an effect equivalent to quantitative restrictions, as are rules that lay down requirements to be met by such goods, even if those rules apply to all products alike (see Commission v Italy, paragraphs 35 and 37).

50. Any other measure which hinders access of products originating in other Member States to the market of a Member State is also covered by that concept (Commission v Italy, paragraph 37).

51. For that reason, the application to products from other Member States of national provisions restricting or prohibiting certain selling arrangements is such as to hinder directly or indirectly, actually or potentially, trade between Member States for the purposes of the case‑law flowing from Dassonville, unless those provisions apply to all relevant traders operating within the national territory and affect in the same manner, in law and in fact, the selling of domestic products and of those from other Member States. The application of such rules to the sale of products from another Member State meeting the requirements laid down by that State is by nature such as to prevent their access to the market or to impede such access more than it impedes the access of domestic products (see, to that effect, Joined Cases C‑267/91 and C‑268/91 Keck and Mithouard [1993] ECR I‑6097, paragraphs 16 and 17, and Commission v Italy, paragraph 36).

52. Accordingly, it is necessary to examine whether the national legislation at issue in the main proceedings meets the two conditions stated in the preceding paragraph of this judgment, in other words, whether it applies to all relevant traders operating within the national territory and whether it affects in the same manner, in law and in fact, the selling of domestic products and the selling of those from other Member States.

53. As regards the first condition, it is clear that the legislation applies to all relevant traders involved in selling contact lenses, which means that that condition is satisfied.

54. As regards the second condition, it is undisputed that the prohibition on the selling of contact lenses via the Internet applies to contact lenses from other Member States which are sold by mail order and delivered to the home of customers resident in Hungary. It is clear that the prohibition on selling contact lenses by mail order deprives traders from other Member States of a particularly effective means of selling those products and thus significantly impedes access of those traders to the market of the Member State concerned (see, by analogy, in relation to medicinal products, Deutscher Apothekerverband, paragraph 74).

55. In those circumstances, that legislation does not affect in the same manner the selling of contact lenses by Hungarian traders and such selling as carried out by traders from other Member States.

56. It follows that that legislation constitutes a measure having an effect equivalent to a quantitative restriction, as prohibited by Article 34 TFEU, unless that legislation can be objectively justified.

Whether the restriction on the free movement of goods is justified

57. According to settled case-law, an obstacle to the free movement of goods may be justified on one of the public interest grounds set out in Article 36 TFEU or in order to meet overriding requirements. In either case, the national provision must be appropriate for securing the attainment of the objective pursued and must not go beyond what is necessary in order to attain it (see, inter alia, Commission v Italy, paragraph 59 and the case-law cited).

58. In that regard, if that measure is within the field of public health, account must be taken of the fact that the health and life of humans rank foremost among the assets and interests protected by the Treaty and that it is for the Member States to determine the level of protection which they wish to afford to public health and the way in which that level is to be achieved. Since the level may vary from one Member State to another, Member States should be allowed a measure of discretion (see Joined Cases C‑570/07 and C‑571/07 Blanco Pérez and Chao Gómez [2010] ECR I‑0000, paragraph 44 and the case-law cited).

59. In the present case, the justification relied on by the Hungarian Government concerns the need to ensure protection of the health of contact lens users. That justification corresponds, therefore, to the public health concerns acknowledged in Article 36 TFEU which may justify an obstacle to the free movement of goods.

60. Accordingly, it is necessary to examine whether the legislation at issue in the main proceedings is appropriate for securing the attainment of the objective pursued.

61. In that regard, the Hungarian and Spanish Governments maintain that it is necessary to require customers to take delivery of contact lenses in specialist shops, because they must have access to an optician who can carry out the necessary physical examinations, undertake checks and give those customers instructions on the wearing of the lenses.

62. On that point, it should be recalled, as was stated in paragraph 35 of this judgment, that the mere wearing of contact lenses may, in individual cases, cause eye ailments, and even lasting visual impairment.

63. Given the risks to public health which thus exist, a Member State may impose a requirement that contact lenses are to be supplied by qualified staff who are to alert the customer to those risks, carry out an examination of the customer and recommend or advise against the wearing of lenses, while inviting the person concerned, where necessary, to obtain the advice of an ophthalmologist. Because of those risks, a Member State may also impose a requirement that, where the wearing of lenses is not advised against, qualified staff are to determine the most appropriate type of lenses, check the positioning of the lenses on the eyes and provide the customer with information on the correct use and care of the lenses (see, to that effect, Case C‑271/92 LPO [1993] ECR I‑2899, paragraph 11).

64. While not entirely eliminating the risks incurred by users of lenses, the establishment of a link to a qualified optician and the services provided by such an optician are likely to reduce those risks. Accordingly, by reserving the supply of contact lenses to the opticians’ shops which offer the services of such an optician, the legislation at issue in the main proceedings is appropriate for securing the attainment of the objective of ensuring protection of the health of those users.

65. It is also necessary, however, that that legislation does not go beyond what is necessary in order to attain that objective, in other words that there are not other measures less restrictive of the free movement of goods by means of which that objective could be achieved.

[...]

75. Consequently, where a Member State adopts legislation such as that at issue in the main proceedings, it exceeds the limits of the discretion referred to in paragraph 58 of this judgment, and that legislation must therefore be held to go beyond what is necessary to attain the objective the Member State claims to pursue.

76. For the same reasons, since it contains a prohibition on selling contact lenses via the Internet, that legislation cannot be held to be proportionate to the objective of ensuring the protection of public health, for the purposes of Article 3(4) of Directive 2000/31.

77. In the light of the foregoing, the answer to the questions submitted by the referring court is that the national rules relating to the selling of contact lenses fall within the scope of Directive 2000/31 since they concern the act of selling such lenses via the Internet; on the other hand, the national rules relating to the supply of contact lenses are not covered by that directive.

78. Articles 34 TFEU and 36 TFEU, and Directive 2000/31, must be interpreted as precluding national legislation which authorises the selling of contact lenses only in shops which specialise in medical devices.

== Criticism and academic commentary of the Ker-Optika jurisprudence ==
Academics have, since the case of Keck, supported a move away from the three-tier test for internal measures, towards a unitary market access test. Ker-Optika is viewed as signalling a conversion in the direction of this approach.
