= Commission v France =

- Court: European Court of Justice
- Full case name: Commission of the European Communities v French Republic

Commission v France (or Commission of the European Communities v French Republic) refers to several different cases heard by the European Court of Justice, which the European Commission brought against France for infringing European Union law. This includes breach of the Treaty on the Functioning of the European Union (TFEU), or a failure to implement European Union Directives:

- In Commission v France (1984) C-202/82, France and Italy require that pasta products be manufactured from durum wheat and do not contain common wheat. France used a different method of analysis to Italy when testing whether pasta contained common wheat.
- In Commission v France (1987) C-196/85, France's system of differential tax treatment for natural sweet wines and liqueur wines did not violate the Treaty of Rome 1957, Article 95.
- In Commission v France (1988) C-312/86, France had failed to adopt all measures to implement Directive 76/207 on gender discrimination by allowing certain privileges for women workers to continue until eliminated by negotiation and collective bargaining.
- In Commission v France (1997) C-265/95, France was held liable for not acting to prevent French farmers attacking imported Spanish strawberries and Belgian tomatoes.

== See also ==
- Commission v Germany
- Commission v Hungary
- Commission v Ireland
- Commission v Italy
- Commission v United Kingdom
