= Commission v Italy (C-110/05) =

EU law case

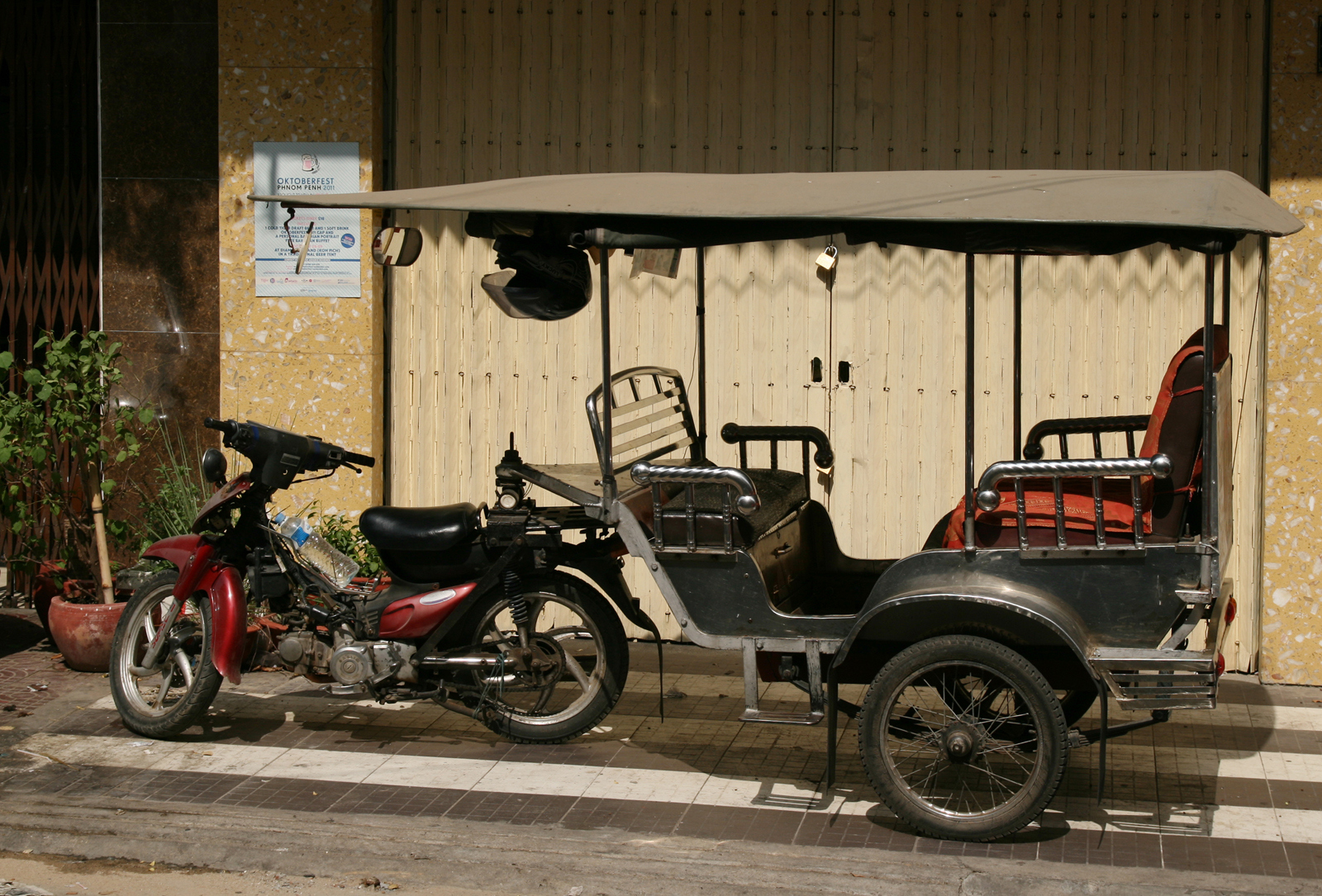
- Court: European Court of Justice
- Citation: (2009) C-110/05, [2009] ECR I-519

Keywords
- Free movement of goods Measures having equivalent effect to quantitative restrictions Internal measures Consumer restrictions Market access test

Commission v Italy (2009) C-110/05 is an EU law case, concerning the free movement of goods in the European Union. This case is commonly referred to as 'Italian Trailers', and is predominantly known for establishing the 'market access test'.

== Facts ==
Italian law prohibited motorcycles and mopeds from pulling trailers (that is, it regulated the use of a product). It applied without regard to the origin of the trailers, but it only affected imported goods in fact. Italian manufacturers did not make such trailers to be towed by motorcycles. The Commission challenged the Italian law as being contrary to TFEU article 34.

== Judgment ==
=== Advocate General Bot ===
AG Bot argued that this should be considered a measure equivalent to a quantitative restriction on trade, that required justification.

=== Court of Justice ===
Court of Justice held that a measure hindering market access would be considered a measure equivalent to a quantitative restriction on trade, but that it could be justified on the facts.

33. It should be recalled that, according to settled case-law, all trading rules enacted by Member States which are capable of hindering, directly or indirectly, actually or potentially, intra-Community trade are to be considered as measures having an effect equivalent to quantitative restrictions and are, on that basis, prohibited by Article 28 EC (see, in particular, Dassonville, paragraph 5).

34. It is also apparent from settled case-law that Article 28 EC reflects the obligation to respect the principles of non-discrimination and of mutual recognition of products lawfully manufactured and marketed in other Member States, as well as the principle of ensuring free access of Community products to national markets (see, to that effect, Case 174/82 Sandoz [1983] ECR 2445, paragraph 26; Case 120/78 Rewe‑Zentral (Cassis de Dijon) [1979] ECR 649, paragraphs 6, 14 and 15; and Keck and Mithouard, paragraphs 16 and 17).

35. Hence, in the absence of harmonisation of national legislation, obstacles to the free movement of goods which are the consequence of applying, to goods coming from other Member States where they are lawfully manufactured and marketed, rules that lay down requirements to be met by such goods constitute measures of equivalent effect to quantitative restrictions even if those rules apply to all products alike (see, to that effect, Cassis de Dijon, paragraphs 6, 14 and 15; Case C‑368/95 Familiapress [1997] ECR I-3689, paragraph 8; and Case C‑322/01 Deutscher Apothekerverband [2003] ECR I-14887, paragraph 67).

36. By contrast, the application to products from other Member States of national provisions restricting or prohibiting certain selling arrangements is not such as to hinder directly or indirectly, actually or potentially, trade between Member States for the purposes of the case‑law flowing from Dassonville, on condition that those provisions apply to all relevant traders operating within the national territory and that they affect in the same manner, in law and in fact, the marketing of domestic products and of those from other Member States. Provided that those conditions are fulfilled, the application of such rules to the sale of products from another Member State meeting the requirements laid down by that State is not by nature such as to prevent their access to the market or to impede access any more than it impedes the access of domestic products (see Keck and Mithouard, paragraphs 16 and 17).

37. Consequently, measures adopted by a Member State the object or effect of which is to treat products coming from other Member States less favourably are to be regarded as measures having equivalent effect to quantitative restrictions on imports within the meaning of Article 28 EC, as are the measures referred to in paragraph 35 of the present judgment. Any other measure which hinders access of products originating in other Member States to the market of a Member State is also covered by that concept.

[...]

50. It is common ground that Article 56 of the Highway Code applies without regard to the origin of trailers.

51. The Commission has not specified whether its action concerns solely trailers which are specially designed for motorcycles or if it also covers other types of trailers. Those two types of trailers must therefore be distinguished when assessing the alleged failure to fulfil obligations.

52. With regard, first, to trailers not specially designed for motorcycles but intended to be towed by automobiles or other types of vehicle, it should be noted that the Commission has not established that the prohibition laid down in Article 56 of the Highway Code hinders access to the market for that type of trailer.

53. The Commission's action must therefore be dismissed in so far as it concerns trailers which are not specially designed to be towed by motorcycles and are legally produced and marketed in Member States other than the Italian Republic.

54. Secondly, the failure to fulfil obligations alleged by the Commission in regard to trailers which are specially designed to be towed by motorcycles and are legally produced and marketed in Member States other than the Italian Republic remains to be examined.

55. In its reply to the Court's written question, the Commission claimed, without being contradicted by the Italian Republic, that, in the case of trailers specially designed for motorcycles, the possibilities for their use other than with motorcycles are very limited. It considers that, although it is not inconceivable that they could, in certain circumstances, be towed by other vehicles, in particular, by automobiles, such use is inappropriate and remains at least insignificant, if not hypothetical.

56. It should be noted in that regard that a prohibition on the use of a product in the territory of a Member State has a considerable influence on the behaviour of consumers, which, in its turn, affects the access of that product to the market of that Member State.

57. Consumers, knowing that they are not permitted to use their motorcycle with a trailer specially designed for it, have practically no interest in buying such a trailer (see, by analogy, Case C‑265/06 Commission v Portugal [2008] ECR I‑0000, paragraph 33, concerning the affixing of tinted film to the windows of motor vehicles). Thus, Article 56 of the Highway Code prevents a demand from existing in the market at issue for such trailers and therefore hinders their importation.

58. It follows that the prohibition laid down in Article 56 of the Highway Code, to the extent that its effect is to hinder access to the Italian market for trailers which are specially designed for motorcycles and are lawfully produced and marketed in Member States other than the Italian Republic, constitutes a measure having equivalent effect to quantitative restrictions on imports within the meaning of Article 28 EC, unless it can be justified objectively.

59. Such a prohibition may be justified on one of the public interest grounds set out in Article 30 EC or in order to meet imperative requirements (see, in particular Case C‑420/01 Commission v Italy [2003] ECR I‑6445, paragraph 29, and Case C‑270/02 Commission v Italy [2004] ECR I‑1559, paragraph 21). In either case, the national provision must be appropriate for securing the attainment of the objective pursued and not go beyond what is necessary in order to attain it (Case C‑54/05 Commission v Finland [2007] ECR I‑2473, paragraph 38, and Case C‑297/05 Commission v Netherlands [2007] ECR I‑7467, paragraph 75).

== Criticism and development of the Italian Trailers jurisprudence ==
The market access test, established in this case, has been criticised for lack of clarity due to the Court having never defined 'market access'. Italian Trailers held that laying down requirements to be met by goods can constitute measures having equivalent effect to quantitative restrictions if they present an obstacle to their free movement, even if those rules apply to all products alike, demonstrating an excessively broad scope for what will constitute a measure equaling equivalent effect to a quantitative restriction.

This test has, however, been the most preferred approach, having overridden the discrimination test introduced by Keck and Mithouard, and attracted wide-spread academic support for replacing all three tests adopted since Keck with a unitary market access test. The recent case of Ker-Optika evidenced a case regarding selling arrangements being decided using a market access test rather than the discrimination test outlined in Keck, demonstrating how the courts may already be taking this approach.

== See also ==
- European Union law
