= Commission v United Kingdom =

Commission v United Kingdom may refer to:

- Commission v United Kingdom (C-337/89) (1992), an EU law case concerning water quality standards and enforcement under the Drinking Water Directive
- Commission v United Kingdom (C-484/04) (2006), a European labour law and UK labour lawcase concerning the Working Time Directive, which is relevant for the Working Time Regulations 1998
- Commission v United Kingdom (C-516/22) (2024)

== See also ==
- Commission v France
- Commission v Germany
- Commission v Hungary
- Commission v Ireland
- Commission v Italy
