= Commission v Ireland =

Commission v Ireland refers to several different cases heard by the European Court of Justice, which the European Commission brought against Ireland for infringing European Union law. This includes breach of the Treaty on the Functioning of the European Union (TFEU), or a failure to implement European Union Directives:

- In Commission v Ireland (1982) Case 249/81, the Irish government was wrong to fund and manage the "Buy Irish" campaign because it breached (what is now) TFEU article 34, by restricting free movement of goods.

== See also ==
- Commission v France
- Commission v Germany
- Commission v Hungary
- Commission v Italy
- Commission v United Kingdom
