= Home state regulation =

EU inter-member trade rule

Home state regulation is a principle in the law of the European Union for resolving conflict of laws between Member States when dealing with cross-border selling or marketing of goods and services. The principle states that, where an action or service is performed in one country but received in another, the applicable law is the law of the country where the action or service is performed. It is also called home country control, country of origin rule, or country of origin principle. It is one possible rule of EU law, specifically of European Single Market law, that determines which laws will apply to goods or services that cross the border of Member States.

The opposing principle is host state regulation or the country of reception principle. In a directive, or regulation, where this principle applies, if a firm based in country A is selling into customers living in country B, they are regulated according to the laws of country B. Host state regulation is sometimes seen as hindering the single market, as firms need to be aware of 28 sets of national law. However, it is also argued that it gives better protection to consumers, who are unlikely to be aware of their rights under the laws of other EU member states.

== Political objectives ==
The "country of origin principle" is a rule that is sometimes advanced with the intention of facilitating the free movement of goods or service providers so as to encourage cross-border competition or, possibly, to encourage individuals or companies to test other markets without having to establish in the target market. It is also sometimes intended to free providers of goods and service from the obligation to accommodate multiple regulatory regimes when trading across borders from a single location.

Home state regulation is often held to help the single market, as firms only need to be aware of their own country's laws, rather than 27 sets of national law.

== Application ==
EU law requires that the goods or services produced legally in one Member States should be allowed unhindered access to markets of other Member States. The latter are not allowed to apply their laws except in specific circumstances. When they are allowed to do so, this will be under a specifically developed test called General Good Test. For example, if a sale of goods is made over the Internet from a website in France to a purchaser in Italy, the country of origin principle would be said to apply if French law applied to the transaction, and the country of reception principle if Italian law prevailed.

The provision underlying the four freedoms (and therefore also the Home Country Control) is the prohibition of discrimination based on nationality: Article 12 (ex 6) of the EC Treaty. Over the course of years, this policy evolved to include prohibition on some behaviors that were non-discriminatory, based on the fact that their implementation created obstacles to trade between states. In a directive, or regulation, where home state regulation applies, if a firm based in country A is selling into customers living in country B, they are regulated according to the laws of country A. In turn, country B has to accept that the laws of country A are sufficient under the principle of mutual recognition.

In the sphere of goods, what these “non-discriminatory” obstacles were and how they were to be removed was clarified in Cassis (C-120/78, [1979] ECR 649) and Keck (Joined Cases C-267 and 268/91, 1993 [ECR] I-6097) cases of the Court of Justice. In services, this was done in Säger (C-76/90, [1991] ECR I-4221), and in establishment in Gebhard (C-55/94, [1995] ECR I-4165). The power of these cases lies in making the products and services legally made in one state (Home State) available in other state (Host State), where the latter is only exceptionally able to apply its law to the said good or service. In other words, once a good or a service gains a “passport” in its Home State, it can be freely exported into any other Member State.

=== New Approach as the basis for home country control ===
The New Approach consists of three important elements:

- minimum harmonization
- mutual recognition of rules
- home country control

and was based on prohibition of non-discriminatory obstacles to trade.

The first part, minimum harmonization, aims to unify the absolute minimum of necessary standards. This would, in turn enable mutual recognition of laws, where the bulk of legal control takes place in the country of origin (Home State) and the country of destination acknowledges the former's regulatory power. This was considered practical, as control would be exercised at first port of call and, since the minimum of mutual standards would exist, there would be no danger of reducing the stringency to the standards of the least developed state.

For example, a banking service is part of wider efforts to harmonize financial services. A French bank is able to open a branch in the United Kingdom and all prudential supervision is conducted in France. The consolidated directive on the business of credit institutions from 2000 represents the minimum of harmonized EC law. Britain (Host State) is obliged to recognize the fact that France only, as the country of origin (Home State) is entitled to conduct prudential supervision. Thus, there is only one control, in the Home State, and dual-burden of control in both states, which makes the service less competitive, disappears. The only option for Britain to apply its law to this banking service is to justify it under the General Good test.

=== Examples of application ===
Directive 2000/31/EC, commonly known as the Electronic Commerce Directive, establishes that the country of origin principle shall prevail in European law for most, but not all, Information Society Services. Recital 22 of that Directive states:

Information society services should be supervised at the source of the activity, in order to ensure an effective protection of public interest objectives; to that end, it is necessary to ensure that the competent authority provides such protection not only for the citizens of its own country but for all Community citizens; in order to improve mutual trust between Member States, it is essential to state clearly this responsibility on the part of the Member State where the services originate; moreover, in order to effectively guarantee freedom to provide services and legal certainty for suppliers and recipients of services, such information society services should in principle be subject to the law of the Member State in which the service provider is established.

The extent to which the country of origin principle should be applied to provision of services generally was a main point of political controversy in negotiation of the proposed Services Directive.

== See also ==
- CE marking
- Country of origin
- European Union law
- Harmonisation of law
- Last substantial transformation
- Mutual recognition agreement
- Rules of origin
