= Freedom of Establishment and Freedom to Provide Services in the European Union =

European Union ideologies

The Freedom to Provide Services or sometimes referred to as free movement of services along with the Freedom of Establishment form the core of the European Union's functioning. With the free movement of workers, citizens, goods and capital, they constitute fundamental rights that give companies and citizens the right to provide services without restrictions in any member country of the EU regardless of nationality and jurisdiction.

After the Second World War, the creation of the European project led to the opening of borders, especially for citizens, since these controls had been almost absent before 1914. The Treaties of Rome laid down the foundations of the four freedoms of the European Union. Initially these freedoms applied to workers, the free provision of services, and the free movement of goods; later on free movement of capital was added.

The right to provide services has proved to be increasingly important as the European economy shifts towards a more service-based economy. Today, it is estimated that the services sector represents about two-thirds of the European economy and it is responsible for 90% of the overall creation of jobs in the EU. Adding to that, the shift to a digital economy means that many things that used to be goods now become services. The Commission is well aware of that and in 2015 launched a proposal for a so-called "Digital Single Market" with the aim of bringing down barriers to unlock digital opportunities.

== Legal basis ==
The freedom to provide services involves the elimination of discrimination on the grounds of nationality and the adoption of measures to make it easier its exercise including the harmonisation of national access rules or mutual recognition. The exercise of both freedoms applies, according to Article 54 of the TFEU, to Self-employed persons and professionals or legal who are legally operating in one Member State. It consists in the right:

- carry out an economic activity in a stable and continuous basis in another EU Member State (freedom of establishment based on Article 49 TFEU);
- offer and provide services in other Member States on a temporary basis while remaining in their country of origin (freedom to provide services: Article 56 TFEU).

Services, nonetheless, according to settled case law, need to have an economic base, that it, a reward for what is being offered by the recipient. This concept is introduced in Grogan (C-159/90) where the court rules on the "economic nature" of the provision of services. The case concerns a company that provides free information for women in Ireland wanting to have an abortion in the UK. The court finds out that the company has no right to claim its freedom to provide services as in this case, as the case would concern "freedom to provide information". This is intrinsically linked to the lack of payment and therefore of an economic link.

Services provided by governments or public entities are called "Services of General Interest". In practice, this means services that are considered to be "essential" and therefore subject to specific public services obligations. This type of services can be divided into three categories:

- Services of general economic interest: basic services that are carried out in return for payment. These services fall within the scope of application of EU law and therefore must consider Internal market and competition rules (e.g. postal services). There may be derogation to these rules if necessary to protect citizens' access to basic services.
- Non-economic services: services whereby recipients do not pay directly to service provider. They are not subject to European law (e.g. police, judicial authorities, army).
- Social services of general interest: services that accommodate the needs of vulnerable citizens being both of an economic or non-economic nature (e.g. social security schemes, employment services and social housing).

In the treaties, more specifically the Treaty on the Functioning of the European Union (TFEU), the freedom to provide services is based on Articles 49–66. The main articles related to both, the right of legal and natural persons to establish themselves in another EU country and there provide services (freedom of establishment), and the right to provide cross-border services without having the need of establishing an office (freedom to provide services) can be found at:

- Right of Establishment
- Right to Provide Services

== Case-Law ==
 Copied some content from European Union Law; see that page's history for attribution.

=== Services ===
The "freedom to provide services" under TFEU article 56 applies to people who give services "for remuneration", especially commercial or professional activity. For example, in Van Binsbergen v Bestuur van de Bedrijfsvereniging voor de Metaalnijverheid a Dutch lawyer moved to Belgium while advising a client in a social security case, and was told he could not continue because Dutch law said only people established in the Netherlands could give legal advice. The Court of Justice held that the freedom to provide services applied, it was directly effective, and the rule was probably unjustified: having an address in the member state would be enough to pursue the legitimate aim of good administration of justice. The Court of Justice has held that secondary education falls outside the scope of article 56 because usually the state funds it, but higher education does not. Health care generally counts as a service. In Geraets-Smits v Stichting Ziekenfonds Mrs Geraets-Smits claimed she should be reimbursed by Dutch social insurance for costs of receiving treatment in Germany. The Dutch health authorities regarded the treatment unnecessary, so she argued this restricted the freedom (of the German health clinic) to provide services. Several governments submitted that hospital services should not be regarded as economic, and should not fall within article 56. But the Court of Justice held health was a "service" even though the government (rather than the service recipient) paid for the service. National authorities could be justified in refusing to reimburse patients for medical services abroad if the health care received at home was without undue delay, and it followed "international medical science" on which treatments counted as normal and necessary. The Court requires that the individual circumstances of a patient justify waiting lists, and this is also true in the context of the UK's National Health Service. Aside from public services, another sensitive field of services are those classified as illegal. Josemans v Burgemeester van Maastricht held that the Netherlands' regulation of cannabis consumption, including the prohibitions by some municipalities on tourists (but not Dutch nationals) going to coffee shops, fell outside article 56 altogether. The Court of Justice reasoned that narcotic drugs were controlled in all member states, and so this differed from other cases where prostitution or other quasi-legal activity was subject to restriction.

If an activity does fall within article 56, a restriction can be justified under article 52, or by overriding requirements developed by the Court of Justice. In Alpine Investments BV v Minister van Financiën a business that sold commodities futures (with Merrill Lynch and another banking firms) attempted to challenge a Dutch law that prohibiting cold calling customers. The Court of Justice held the Dutch prohibition pursued a legitimate aim to prevent "undesirable developments in securities trading" including protecting the consumer from aggressive sales tactics, thus maintaining confidence in the Dutch markets. In Omega Spielhallen GmbH v Bonn a "laserdrome" business was banned by the Bonn council. It bought fake laser gun services from a UK firm called Pulsar Ltd, but residents had protested against "playing at killing" entertainment. The Court of Justice held that the German constitutional value of human dignity, which underpinned the ban, did count as a justified restriction on freedom to provide services. In Liga Portuguesa de Futebol v Santa Casa da Misericórdia de Lisboa the Court of Justice also held that the state monopoly on gambling, and a penalty for a Gibraltar firm that had sold internet gambling services, was justified to prevent fraud and gambling where people's views were highly divergent. The ban was proportionate as this was an appropriate and necessary way to tackle the serious problems of fraud that arise over the internet. In the Services Directive a group of justifications were codified in article 16, which the case law has developed.

Other important cases related to specific issues are:

- C-263/86 Humber ed Edel Secondary education – This case is particularly relevant as the court rules on the essential characteristic of remuneration. It considers that it lies in the fact that it constitutes consideration for the service in question. It is absent in the case of courses provided under the national education system because, first of all, the State, in establishing an maintaining such a system, is not seeking to engage in gainful activity but is fulfilling its duties towards its own population in the social, cultural and educational fields and. Secondly, the system in question is funded from the public purse and not by pupils or their parents.
- C-157/99 Smits and Peerborns Health Care - The Court said here that health care is a service. For the purposes of Article 57 the essential characteristic of remuneration lies in the fact that it constitutes consideration for the service in question. In the present cases, the payments made by the sickness insurance funds under the contractual arrangements, albeit set at a flat rate, are indeed the consideration for the hospital services and unquestionably represent remuneration for the hospital which receives them and which is engaged in an activity of an economic character.
- Van Binsberger 33/74 – In this case, Mr. Kortman is a Dutch national that provides representation services in court proceedings where the representation by a lawyer is not mandatory. Mr. Van Binsbergen hired Mr Kortmann and subsequently he moves to Belgium. The main point of tension in this case is that Dutch legislation imposes that representation services must be carried out by residents in the Netherlands, meaning that Mr. Kortmann is unable to exercise his profession. In this case, the Court finds that it is a discriminatory measure because it treats less favourably residents from other countries to the extent that it blocks their ability to provide services in the Netherlands. The normal outcome in such cases is that the Court rules for the "setting aside" of such measures as no acceptable justification is provided under those foreseen in the treaties after assessing the proportionality and the necessity os the justification.

=== Establishment ===
As well as creating rights for "workers" who generally lack bargaining power in the market, the Treaty on the Functioning of the European Union also protects the "freedom of establishment" in article 49, and "freedom to provide services" in article 56. In Gebhard v Consiglio dell’Ordine degli Avvocati e Procuratori di Milano the Court of Justice held that to be "established" means to participate in economic life "on a stable and continuous basis", while providing "services" meant pursuing activity more "on a temporary basis". This meant that a lawyer from Stuttgart, who had set up chambers in Milan and was censured by the Milan Bar Council for not having registered, should claim for breach of establishment freedom, rather than service freedom. However, the requirements to be registered in Milan before being able to practice would be allowed if they were non-discriminatory, "justified by imperative requirements in the general interest" and proportionately applied. All people or entities that engage in economic activity, particularly the self-employed, or "undertakings" such as companies or firms, have a right to set up an enterprise without unjustified restrictions. The Court of Justice has held that both a member state government and a private party can hinder freedom of establishment, so article 49 has both "vertical" and "horizontal" direct effect. In Reyners v Belgium the Court of Justice held that a refusal to admit a lawyer to the Belgian bar because he lacked Belgian nationality was unjustified. TFEU article 49 says states are exempt from infringing others' freedom of establishment when they exercise "official authority". But regulation of an advocate's work (as opposed to a court's) was not official. By contrast in Commission v Italy the Court of Justice held that a requirement for lawyers in Italy to comply with maximum tariffs unless there was an agreement with a client was not a restriction. The Grand Chamber of the Court of Justice held the commission had not proven that this had any object or effect of limiting practitioners from entering the market. Therefore, there was no prima facie infringement freedom of establishment that needed to be justified.

In regard to companies, the Court of Justice held in R (Daily Mail and General Trust plc) v HM Treasury that member states could restrict a company moving its seat of business, without infringing TFEU article 49. This meant the Daily Mail newspaper's parent company could not evade tax by shifting its residence to the Netherlands without first settling its tax bills in the UK. The UK did not need to justify its action, as rules on company seats were not yet harmonised. By contrast, in Centros Ltd v Erhversus-og Selkabssyrelsen the Court of Justice found that a UK limited company operating in Denmark could not be required to comply with Denmark's minimum share capital rules. UK law only required £1 of capital to start a company, while Denmark's legislature took the view companies should only be started up if they had 200,000 Danish krone (around €27,000) to protect creditors if the company failed and went insolvent. The Court of Justice held that Denmark's minimum capital law infringed Centros Ltd's freedom of establishment and could not be justified, because a company in the UK could admittedly provide services in Denmark without being established there, and there were less restrictive means of achieving the aim of creditor protection. This approach was criticised as potentially opening the EU to unjustified regulatory competition, and a race to the bottom in legal standards, like the US state of Delaware, which is argued to attract companies with the worst standards of accountability, and unreasonably low corporate tax. Appearing to meet the concern, in Überseering BV v Nordic Construction GmbH the Court of Justice held that a German court could not deny a Dutch building company the right to enforce a contract in Germany, simply because it was not validly incorporated in Germany. Restrictions on freedom of establishment could be justified by creditor protection, labour rights to participate in work, or the public interest in collecting taxes. But in this case denial of capacity went too far: it was an "outright negation" of the right of establishment. Setting a further limit, in Cartesio Oktató és Szolgáltató bt the Court of Justice held that because corporations are created by law, they must be subject to any rules for formation that a state of incorporation wishes to impose. This meant the Hungarian authorities could prevent a company from shifting its central administration to Italy, while it still operated and was incorporated in Hungary. Thus, the court draws a distinction between the right of establishment for foreign companies (where restrictions must be justified), and the right of the state to determine conditions for companies incorporated in its territory, although it is not entirely clear why.

Other important cases to be considered are:

- Cartesio 210/06 – Refers to a Hungarian company wanting to move to Italy while wanting to keep its seat in Hungary. In this case, the Court rules that “companies are creatures of national law and they exist only by virtue of the national legislation which determines their incorporation and functioning”. It turns out that primary establishment is very difficult to give up as companies have already a client base and a "reputation" already in place. If a company, such as in the case, would see itself forced to transfer its seat, the company would have to "dissolve" and recreate itself elsewhere. While it is doable, if it was simple, there would be regulatory competition (forum shopping) among Member States, and that is not the scope of European law. What happens in this case is secondary establishment (agency, branch, subsidiary), which is legal through the freedom of establishment.
- Vale 378/10 – In this case, we can see the opposite situation of what has been mentioned in the previous case. Vale (company) was read to become a Hungarian company. (Note: It is characterised as a conversion.) It did not want to stay Italian. By doing so, the company expected to be the "successor" of the Italian company it previously was. (Note: If it appears that your business was born yesterday, you credit worthiness is not going to be the same) Hungarian authorities simply said that it was not possible. In this case, the Court ruled that the Hungarian measure forbidding cross-border conversion constitutes a hindrance to the Freedom of Establishment, as primary establishment is also a form of establishment. In this judgement, the Court applies two basic principles to the reasoning, that of Equivalence and that of Effectiveness. Basically, the Court says: ‘If you have domestic conversion, it should not be more difficult to make cross-border conversion than it is for domestic companies'.

== Overview ==
Since the launching of the Single Market, replacing the then called "Common Market", the commission has been particularly active in the launching of initiatives that affected. The following table show some of the progress made from 1985 to 2016.

Type	Progress
Establishment and Cross-Border Supply	ECJ activism in restricting barriers to free movement – ‘market access’ test (e.g. Sager 1990 and Gouda 1989).
Harmonization	Dir. 2006/123 – Also known as "Services Directive", it establishes horizontal principles applicable to all services. Only those already covered by sector-specific regulations are exempt.
Financial Services	Financial passport based on harmonized criteria for national licenses.; Home country supervision of financial institutions; host country control for business conduct, consumer protection and ‘systemic’ stability of host market.; Two pieces of legislation on investment services and financial market infrastructure (MiFID II 2014/65, MiFIR 600/2014).; European System of Financial Supervision with the participation of the European Systemic Risk Board and the European Supervisory Authorities (EBA, EIOPA, ESMA).; Banking Union: European Banking Supervision, Single Resolution Mechanism and Directives on national guarantees schemes and national resolution schemes; CRD IV package for capital requirements and prudential supervision.; Capital Markets Union: Easier funding for SMEs, Retail Investment measures, revision of the Solvency Directive, Single Blue Book for companies, Pan-European Venture Capital Programme, etc.
Services of General Economic Interest	Amsterdam Treaty with the introduction of article 14 TFEU about services of general interest and the shared values of the Union in this regard proposed in Protocol 26.
Network Industries	In the field of telecoms, gas, electricity, postal services and rails the commission has played a proactive role in opening the market through pro-competitive regulations and in some cases the establishment of universal services obligations.; European regulatory networks to complement national authorities.; Liberalization initiatives in the fields road, air and maritime transport.

== Services Directive ==
Launched in 2004 by the European Commission, It was seen as an important kick-start to the Lisbon Agenda which, launched in 2000, was an agreed strategy to make the EU "the world's most dynamic and competitive economy" by 2010. The main aim of the Directive is to create a genuine internal market in Services. As the directive intends to harmonise rules, the main idea is to eliminate regulation that hampers trade and directive investment in services. The Services Directive introduces the principle of "country of origin" for the provision of services in the EU, meaning that a legal/natural person following the rules in its home country is entitled to provide services in other EU countries without following additional regulation in the host country where the service is provided.

In addition to that, the directive is responsible for establishing:

- Single Points of contact serving as one-stop-shops for service providers to get information and complete administrative formalities online in all EU countries
- Rights for recipient of services strengthening consumers rights and business receiving services in the EU
- Administrative cooperation and mutual assistance in the supervision of service providers in EU countries
- Guide that sums up the basic information on the services directive.

The implementation of the directive has been significantly delayed in a number of Member States in relation to the original deadline (28 December 2009). In June 2010 the Commission started infringement procedure against some member states – namely Austria, Belgium, Cyprus, France, Germany, Greece, Ireland, Luxembourg, Portugal, Romania, Slovenia and the United Kingdom – that had not communicate the measures they had adopted in order to transpose the directive.

== Financial Services ==
The rights to provide cross-border services in the field of finance is also guaranteed within the Union's legislative framework and it constitutes one of the pillars of the European single market. Since the implementation of free movement of capitals after the Single European Act (SEA), the subsequent Financial Services Action Plan (1999) and the recent launch of the Capital Markets Union under the Junker administration, several directives and regulations were proposed and adopted by the institutions in order to facilitate the process of cross-border provision of financial services. The most relevant of them are:

- Directive 2014/65/EU on markets in financial instruments known as MIFID 2: It applies to investment firms, market operators, data reporting services and third-country firms (with a branch in the EU) and establishes requirements related to authorisations, operating conditions, rules on transparency, specific rules for regulated markets, etc. In practice, MIFID is responsible for granting market access through the so-called "passporting rights" for companies authorised under national law. It enables such companies to operate in any other EU countries provided that such authorisation is granted and supervised under the conditions provided for in the Directive.
- Regulation No 600/2014/EU on markets in financial Instruments known as MIFIR: it builds on MIFID 2 and takes into consideration the lessons from the 2008 crisis to establish uniform requirements on the following: i) disclosure of data to the public; ii) reporting of transactions to competent authorities; iii) trading of derivatives on organised venues; iv) non-discretionary access to clearing and non-discretionary access to bench marks; v) product intervention powers of competent authorities, in special ESMA and EBA; and vi) provisions of investment services or activities by third-country firms following and applicable equivalence decision by the commission (with the establishment of a branch or not).
- Regulation No 2017/1129 known as the Prospectus Regulation: it updated the previous Prospectus rules providing flexibility to all types of issuers and simplifying rules for the formulation of prospectuses. In addition, it provides for broader exceptions for small offerings and ensures that appropriate rules cover the full life-cycle of companies (going from the start-up stage until maturity and further developing into a frequent issuer on regulated markets.
- Directive 2013/36/EU known as Capital Requirements Directive (CRD): It is responsible for the implementation of the Basel III Agreement in the EU. It establishes prudential rules for banks, building societies and investment firms introducing requirements for: i) the rules for counterpart risk; ii) liquidity and leverage requirements; iii) quality and quantity of capital; iv) macro-prudential standards; and v) passporting – among other.
- Regulation No 596/2014/EU known as Market Abuse Regulation (MAR): reinforces investigative and administrative sanctioning in relation to market abuse when it comes financial instruments traded in Regulated Market, Multilateral Trading Facilities (MTFs), Organised Trading Facilities (OTFs) and other.
- Regulation No 548/2012/EU known as European Market infrastructure Regulation (EMIR): sets out rules regarding over-the-counter (OTC) derivative contracts, central counterparties and trade repositories. The main aim is to preserve stability in financial markets through risk mitigation and the introduction of new transparency requirements.
- Directive 2015/2366 on payment services in the internal market (PSD 2): it recognises the new for new rules fit to the digital age. It reinforces security requirements regarding electronic payments, consumer protection and rules on the authorisation and supervision of payment institutions. It opens up the market to innovative business models commonly known as 'open banking'.

Other regulations/directives to be considered are:

- Bank Recovery and resolution Directive (BRRD) 2014/59/EU
- Deposit Guarantee Schemes Directive (DGSD) 2014/49/EU
- Solvency II 2009/138/EC
- Single Supervisory Mechanism Regulation (SSMR) 1024/2013

=== Banking Union ===
The Banking Union is responsible for the supervision of the banking system in Europe through the establishment of harmonised rules. Its aim is to ensure stability in the euro zone and spare taxpayers and the real economy of the eventual risk of a bank's bankruptcy. It encompasses all euro zone countries plus those who want to take part. The Banking Union work through:

- The single rulebook - set of legislative texts applying to all financial institutions and products in the Union. It includes rules on capital requirements, improved deposit guarantees schemes and the management of failing banks.
- European Banking Supervision - the EU's supranational bank supervisory regime consisting of the European Central Bank in cooperation with national competent authorities.
- The Single Resolution Mechanism - It is a system for resolution of non-viable financial institutions. It has two main parts, the Singl Resolution Board and the Single Resolution Fund.

=== Capital Markets Union ===
The CMU was considered as the "New frontier of Europe's single market" by the Commission aiming at tackling the different problems surrounding capital markets in Europe such as: the reduction of market fragmentation, diversification of financial sources, cross-border capital flows with a special attention for Small and Medium-sized enterprises (SMEs). The project was also seen as the final step for the completion of the Economic and Monetary Union as it was complementary to the Banking Union that had been the stage for intense legislative activity since its launching in 2012. The CMU project meant centralisation and delegation of powers at the supranational level with the field of macroeconomic governance and banking supervision being the most affected.

The first Action Plan for the Capital Markets Unions presented by the commission in 2015 involves:

- Financing for innovation, start-ups and non-listed companies
- Making it easier for companies to enter and raise capital on public markets
- Investing for the long term, infrastructure and sustainable investment
- Fostering retail investment
- Strengthening banking capacity to support the wider economy
- Facilitating cross-border investment

== Digital Single Market ==
The transport of goods is the most integrated sector to date following a historical evolution due to a certain "priority" given to this sector within the institutional framework in the early phases of the European project. Now that services account for more than two-thirds of the European economy, and yet the Single Market lags behind in the integration of digital services. According to European Commission, an integrated digital single market could increase EU gross GDP by more than 400 billion euro a year. Based on this, the Digital Single Market project was launched by the European Commission in May 2015 with the three main pillars:

1. Better access for consumers and businesses to digital goods and services across Europe;
2. Creating the right conditions and a level playing field for digital networks and innovative services to flourish;
3. Maximising the growth potential of the digital economy.

The project has become particularly important for the free provision of services as many initiatives aiming at removing barriers for consumers and companies was implemented. Among them we can cite, notably:

1. the end of roaming charges.
2. the modernisation of data protection.
3. the cross-border portability of online content.
4. the agreement to unlock e-commerce by stopping unjustified geo-blocking.

More recently the European Commission under Ursula Von der Leyen proposed the introduction of a Digital Services Act as a way to revise the "eCommerce Directive". Based on the guidelines we can say that the new Directive will be based in two pillars:

1. Single Market Pillar: Commercial in essence (trading information society services without barriers)
2. Content Pillar: Societal interests (redefining liability aspects, tackling hate speech, misleading information, terrorist content etc.).

== See also ==
- European Single Market
- Capital Markets Union
- Free movement for workers in the European Union
- Treaty on the Functioning of the European Union
- Digital Single Market
