= DocMorris =

European Healthcare Company

DocMorris AG
- Company type: public limited company
- Traded as: SIX: DOCM
- ISIN: CH0042615283
- Industry: Online pharmacy, e-commerce
- Founded: 1993
- Headquarters: Frauenfeld (TG), Switzerland
- Key people: Walter Hess (CEO)
- Revenue: ▼CHF 1'608 million (2022)
- Net income: ▲CHF -171 million (2022)
- Number of employees: ▼2’200 (2023)
- Website: corporate.docmorris.com

DocMorris AG, formerly Zur Rose Group, is an online pharmacy operating in Germany, the Netherlands, Spain, France and Switzerland. Its services are offered under various brands, DocMorris being the most well-known one. It has developed into a comprehensive digital health service provider including e-commerce pharmacy, marketplace and professional health products and services. The DocMorris shares are listed on the SIX Swiss Exchange. As of 2023 it had more than 10 million active customers.

== History ==
Zur Rose was founded in 1993 by the present chairman of the Board of Directors Walter Oberhänsli and a group of medical doctors as wholesale suppliers for self-dispensing doctors in Switzerland. The former company name derived from the house Zur Rose in Steckborn, Switzerland, where the first stationary pharmacy of the company was opened. From it, doctors from the region were supplied with medicines. In 1999, the company moved from Steckborn to its current headquarters in Frauenfeld.

In 2009 the pharmaceutical company Helvepharm AG was sold to Sanofi Aventis. In 2012, Zur Rose acquired Europe's largest online pharmacy DocMorris and in 2019 with medpex, the third-largest online pharmacy of Germany. Further acquisitions in pharma logistics and online commerce were Ogera AG (2001), Helvepharm AG (2006), DocMorris (2012), Eurapon Pharmahandel GmbH (2017), Promofarma (2018) and apo-rot (2018). The group also acquired two software companies; BlueCare AG (2015) and TeleClinic (2020), a telemedicine provider.

Zur Rose Group IPOed on the SIX Swiss Exchange on July 6, 2017. Since 2017 Zur Rose Group operates in Switzerland a small number of physical shop-in-shop stores in collaboration with Switzerland's largest retailer Migros.

In 2022, the medpex brand was integrated at the Heerlen location and capacity more than doubled. The logistics site in Bremen was closed at the same time and the Eurapon brand discontinued.

In May 2023, the Zur Rose Switzerland business was sold to the Migros subsidiary Medbase. Following this event Zur Rose Group AG was renamed DocMorris AG and the stock market ticker symbol was changed from ROSE to DOCM.

== Brands ==
Zur Rose Group operates under the following brands:

- DocMorris
- medpex
- Eurapon
- Apo-rot
- apotal.de
- TeleClinic
- eHealth-Tec
- PromoFarma
- DoctiPharma

== See also ==
- Deutscher Apothekerverband v 0800 DocMorris NV
