= Commission v Hungary (C-821/19) =

European Court of Justice case involving asylum laws

- European Court of Justice

Submitted 8 November 2019 Decided 16 November 2021
- Full case name: European Commission v Hungary
- Case: C-821/19
- ECLI: ECLI:EU:C:2021:930
- Case type: Actions for failure to fulfil obligations
- Chamber: Grand Chamber
- Language of proceedings: Hungarian

Court composition
- President; Koen Lenaerts
- Judge Rapporteur; Constantinos Lycourgos
- Advocate General; Athanasios Rantos

Case C-821/19 (Commission v Hungary) was a case decided by the European Court of Justice (CJEU) on 16 November 2021 involving asylum laws in Hungary. The CJEU ruled that Hungary had violated EU law by restricting access to asylum and criminalizing assistance to asylum seekers, as those restrictions violated EU directives 2013/32/EU and 2013/33/EU.

In June 2018, the Government of Hungary passed legislation called the Stop Soros law, which prohibited assisting people with asylum, an act considered "facilitating illegal immigration". In July 2018, the European Commission gave a letter formal notice to Hungary about this legislation, stating non-compliance with EU asylum laws.

The Grand Chamber of the CJEU decided on 16 November 2021 that Hungary had breached EU law. It ruled that Hungary violated Article 8(2) and Article 22(1) of the EU directive 2013/32/EU and Article 10(4) of the EU directive 2013/33/EU. Hungary's legislation that criminalized the supporting of asylum was found to go against the migration and asylum policy of the European Union.

== Background ==
=== Stop Soros law ===
The case concerned legislation passed on 20 June 2018 by Hungary, dubbed the "Stop Soros law" (named after Hungarian-born philanthropist George Soros). The legislation was passed by the government of Viktor Orbán and was named as such since the government accused Soros of helping Muslim migrants. The several laws part of Stop Soros law criminalized helping seekers of asylum with staying in Hungary, with offenses of "facilitating illegal immigration" resulting in a year of imprisonment, as part of an effort to prevent illegal migrants from gaining asylum.

=== Reactions ===
The European Commission sent a letter of formal notice to Hungary on 18 July 2018 concerning the criminalization of supporting asylum in Stop Soros law, saying that the legislation violates EU asylum law. In a separate case (C-78/18), the CJEU had previously ruled that other parts of the Stop Soros law were incompatible with freedom of market rules and the Charter of Fundamental Rights. In a 2020 hearing, Hungary argued that it had not charged anyone under the law.

== AG opinion ==
On 25 February 2021, CJEU advocate general Athanasios Rantos issued his advisory opinion, recommending that the CJEU find a violation in the case.

== CJEU ruling ==
The court largely upheld the commission's complaint that Hungary had breached EU law. Hungary added an additional inadmissibility criteria to requests for asylum, making such requests inadmissible if the person had passed through any country where they were not subject to persecution or danger. According to European Union law, this is only an inadmissibility reason if the person applying for asylum has a connection to the transit country and can be deported there. The CJEU ruled that this violated EU law because the Procedures Directive already specified an exhaustive list of inadmissibility criteria, which did not include the Hungarian provision.

The court also ruled that Hungary had violated Articles 8(2) and 22(1) of the Procedures Directive (2013/32/EU) and Article 10(4) of the Reception Directive (2013/33/EU) by criminalizing assistance to asylum seekers who are not entitled to protection under Hungarian law. The CJEU's press release stated, "Criminalizing such activities impinges on the exercise of the rights safeguarded by the EU legislature in respect of the assistance of applicants for international protection". The Hungarian law, according to the CJEU, criminalizes behavior that cannot be viewed as fraudulent or abusive. A private individual cannot be expected to know whether an asylum application will be successful or not, so in practice the law creates uncertainty as to whether any aid to people applying for asylum is legal and deters any assistance to asylum seekers. Furthermore, the law criminalizes assistance to those who do not have a possibility of gaining asylum according to the Hungarian law, even when these people are entitled to asylum under European Union law. In particular, the criminalization of assistance undermines the right to communicate with asylum seekers (guaranteed in Article 8(2) of the Procedures Directive and in Article 10(4) of the Reception Directive) as well as the asylum seeker's right to hire legal representation in asylum proceedings (Article 22(1) of the Procedures Directive).

== Responses ==
David Vig, the director of Amnesty International in Hungary, stated that "Today’s court ruling sends an unequivocal message that the Hungarian government’s campaign of intimidation, targeting those who stand up for the rights of refugees and asylum-seekers cannot, and will not be tolerated". Hungarian Helsinki Committee also welcomed the ruling.

== See also ==
- Commission v Hungary (disambiguation)
