= Alpine Investments BV v Minister van Financiën =

- Court: European Court of Justice
- Citation: (1995) C-384/93, [1995] ECR I-1141, [1995] 2 CMLR 209

Keywords
- Free movement of services

Alpine Investments BV v Minister van Financiën (1995) C-384/93 is an EU law case, concerning the free movement of services in the European Union.

== Facts ==
Alpine Investments BV claimed that the Dutch Ministry of Finance should not have prohibited it on 1 October 1991 from ‘cold calling’ to sell commodities futures without prior consent from customers, because this was an unjustifiable restriction on freedom to provide services under TFEU article 56 (ex article 49 TEEC). Alpine, which place orders with Merrill Lynch, offered portfolio management, investment advice and the transmission of clients’ orders to brokers operating on commodities futures markets. The Wet Effectenhandel (Law on Securities Transactions) of 30 October 1985, article 6(1) required a licence to be an intermediary and art 8(2) said it could be restricted to prevent ‘undesirable developments in securities trading.’ The Ministry got numerous complaints, including people from other member states, and he acted to preserve the Dutch financial sector's reputation. In January 1992 it got authorisation to place orders with another broker, Rodham & Renshaw, but still with a prohibition on cold calling.

The Dutch Administrative Court referred to the ECJ asking whether protection of consumers and protecting the Dutch securities trading reputation could be a public interest reason to stop cold calling, and whether a ban was necessary. It was common ground that this was services under art 60 TEEC as it was for remuneration.

== Judgment ==
The Court of Justice held that Alpine Investments BV could be restrained from "cold calling" because the rules were likely justified on grounds of consumer protection and preserving the Dutch financial sector's good reputation.

28 ... a prohibition deprives the operators concerned of a rapid and direct technique for marketing and for contacting potential clients in other Member States. It can therefore constitute a restriction on the freedom to provide cross-border services.

[...]

31 ... the prohibition of cold calling does not fall outside the scope of Article 56 of the Treaty simply because it is imposed by the State in which the provider of services is established.

32 Finally, certain arguments adduced by the Netherlands Government and the United Kingdom must be considered.

33 They submit that the prohibition at issue falls outside the scope of Article 56 of the Treaty because it is a generally applicable measure, it is not discriminatory and neither its object nor its effect is to put the national market at an advantage over providers of services from other Member States. Since it affects only the way in which the services are offered, it is analogous to the non-discriminatory measures governing selling arrangements which, according to the decision in Joined Cases C-267 and 268/91 Keck and Mithouard [1993] ECR I-6097, paragraph 16, do not fall within the scope of Article 30 of the Treaty.

34 Those arguments cannot be accepted.

[...]

37 According to that judgment, the application to products from other Member States of national provisions restricting or prohibiting, within the Member State of importation, certain selling arrangements is not such as to hinder trade between Member States so long as, first, those provisions apply to all relevant traders operating within the national territory and, secondly, they affect in the same manner, in law and in fact, the marketing of domestic products and of those from other Member States. The reason is that the application of such provisions is not such as to prevent access by the latter to the market of the Member State of importation or to impede such access more than it impedes access by domestic products.

38 A prohibition such as that at issue is imposed by the Member State in which the provider of services is established and affects not only offers made by him to addressees who are established in that State or move there in order to receive services but also offers made to potential recipients in another Member State. It therefore directly affects access to the market in services in the other Member States and is thus capable of hindering intra-Community trade in services.

39 The answer to the second question is therefore that rules of a Member State which prohibit providers of services established in its territory from making unsolicited telephone calls to potential clients established in other Member States in order to offer their services constitute a restriction on freedom to provide services within the meaning of Article 56 of the Treaty.

[...]

42 Financial markets play an important role in the financing of economic operators and, given the speculative nature and the complexity of commodities futures contracts, the smooth operation of financial markets is largely contingent on the confidence they inspire in investors. That confidence depends in particular on the existence of professional regulations serving to ensure the competence and trustworthiness of the financial intermediaries on whom investors are particularly reliant.

[...]

44 Maintaining the good reputation of the national financial sector may therefore constitute an imperative reason of public interest capable of justifying restrictions on the freedom to provide financial services.

45 As for the proportionality of the restriction at issue, it is settled case-law that requirements imposed on the providers of services must be appropriate to ensure achievement of the intended aim and must not go beyond that which is necessary in order to achieve that objective (see Case C-288/89 Collectieve Antennevoorziening Gouda and Others v Commissariat voor de Media [1991] ECR I-4007, paragraph 15).

46 As the Netherlands Government has justifiably submitted, in the case of cold calling the individual, generally caught unawares, is in a position neither to ascertain the risks inherent in the type of transactions offered to him nor to compare the quality and price of the caller' s services with competitors' offers. Since the commodities futures market is highly speculative and barely comprehensible for non-expert investors, it was necessary to protect them from the most aggressive selling techniques.

47 Alpine Investments argues however that the Netherlands Government' s prohibition of cold calling is not necessary because the Member State of the provider of services should rely on the controls imposed by the Member State of the recipient.

48 That argument must be rejected. The Member State from which the telephone call is made is best placed to regulate cold calling. Even if the receiving State wishes to prohibit cold calling or to make it subject to certain conditions, it is not in a position to prevent or control telephone calls from another Member State without the cooperation of the competent authorities of that State.

[...]

50 Alpine Investments also argues that a general prohibition of telephone canvassing of potential clients is not necessary for the achievement of the objectives pursued by the Netherlands authorities. Requiring broking firms to tape-record unsolicited telephone calls made by them would suffice to protect consumers effectively. Such rules have moreover been adopted in the United Kingdom by the Securities and Futures Authority.

51 That point of view cannot be accepted. As the Advocate General correctly states in point 88 of his Opinion, the fact that one Member State imposes less strict rules than another Member State does not mean that the latter' s rules are disproportionate and hence incompatible with Community law.

52 Alpine Investments argues finally that, since it is of a general nature, the prohibition of cold calling does not take into account the conduct of individual undertakings and accordingly imposes an unnecessary burden on undertakings which have never been the subject of complaints by consumers.

53 That argument must also be rejected. Limiting the prohibition of cold calling to certain undertakings because of their past conduct might not be sufficient to achieve the objective of restoring and maintaining investor confidence in the national securities markets in general.

54 In any event, the rules at issue are limited in scope. First, they prohibit only the contacting of potential clients by telephone or in person without their prior agreement in writing, while other techniques for making contact are still permitted. Next, the measure affects relations with potential clients but not with existing clients who may still give their written agreement to further calls. Finally, the prohibition of unsolicited telephone calls is limited to the sector in which abuses have been found, namely the commodities futures market.

55 In the light of the above, the prohibition of cold calling does not appear disproportionate to the objective which it pursues.

== See also ==
- European Union law
- home state regulation
