= Commission v Hungary =

Commission v Hungary may refer to:

- Commission v Hungary (C-821/19), 2021 European Court of Justice judgement involving asylum laws in Hungary
- Commission v Hungary (C-769/22), 2026 European Court of Justice judgement concerning an anti-LGBTI law enacted by Hungary

== See also ==
- Commission v France
- Commission v Germany
- Commission v Ireland
- Commission v Italy
- Commission v United Kingdom
