= Commission v Germany =

Commission v Germany may refer to:

- Commission v Germany (1987), in which article 34 TFEU did not permit the German Beer Tax Act to limit the definition of "beer" to just products that contained only malted barley, hops, yeast, water.
- Commission v Germany (2007), on freedom of capital, holding it was "disproportionate" to limit big shareholders' votes and for Lower Saxony to have a golden share, for the government's stated aim of protecting workers or minority shareholders.

== See also ==
- Commission v France
- Commission v Hungary
- Commission v Ireland
- Commission v Italy
- Commission v United Kingdom
