= Commission v France (C-265/95) =

EU law case

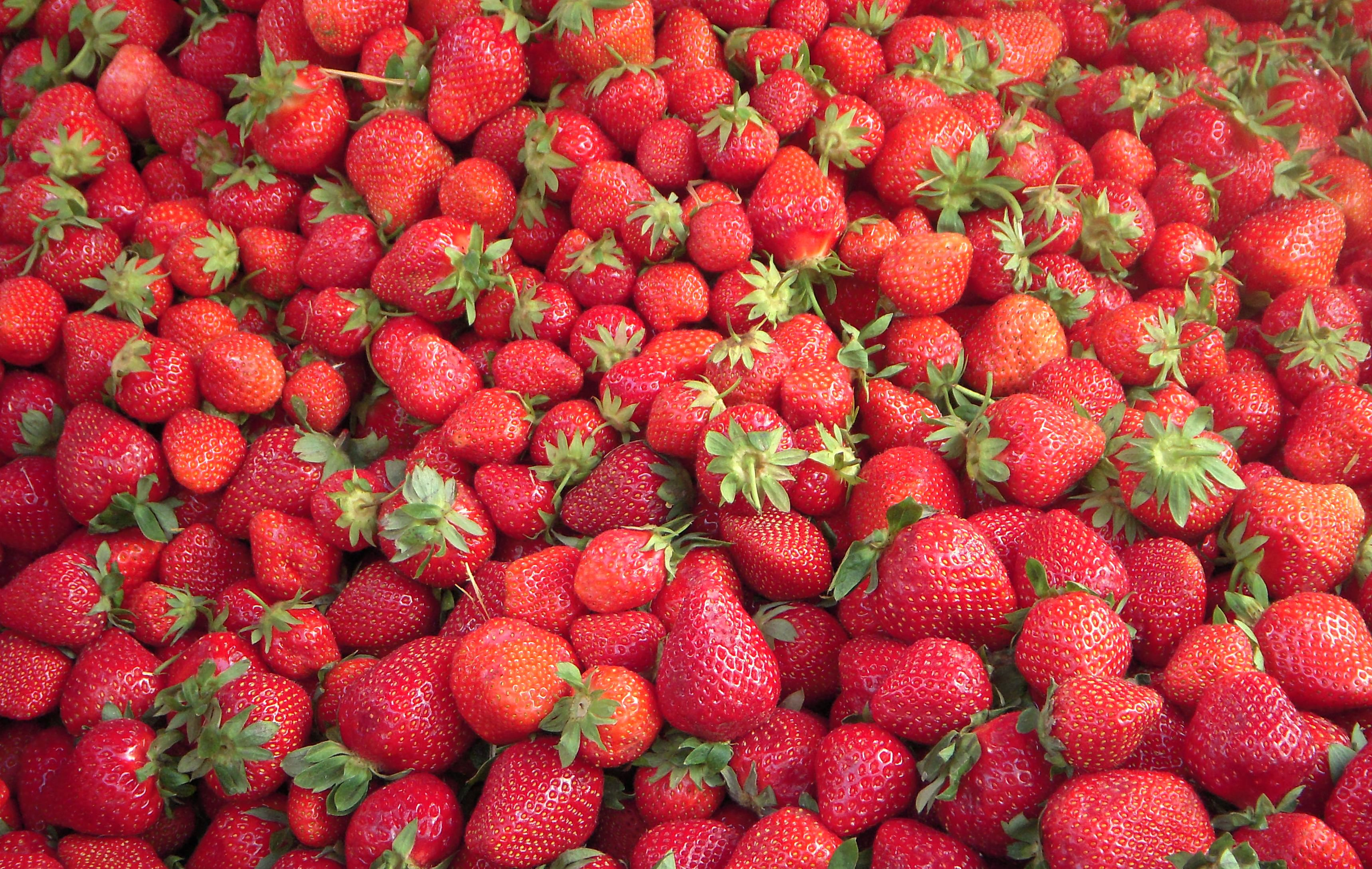
- Court: European Court of Justice
- Citation: (1997) C-265/95

Keywords
- Free movement of goods

Commission v France (1997) C-265/95 is an EU law case concerning the free movement of goods in the European Union.

== Facts ==
French farmers sabotaged imported agricultural produce, such as Spanish strawberries and Belgian tomatoes, and French authorities turned a blind eye. The Commission brought enforcement proceedings under TFEU article 258 for ‘failing to take all necessary and proportionate measures’ to prevent the obstructions to trade by the farmers. It argued the failure contravened TFEU article 34 in conjunction with TEU article 4(3) on the duty of cooperation (ex article 10 TEC).

== Judgment ==
The Court of Justice held that TFEU article 34 was infringed, as it prohibited not only state action, but also inaction. The French authorities should have acted and would be liable for "manifestly and persistently" abstaining from taking appropriate measures.

28 ... Article 34 provides that quantitative restrictions on imports and all measures having equivalent effect are prohibited between Member States.

29 That provision, taken in its context, must be understood as being intended to eliminate all barriers, whether direct or indirect, actual or potential, to flows of imports in intra-Community trade.

30 As an indispensable instrument for the realization of a market without internal frontiers, Article 30 therefore does not prohibit solely measures emanating from the State which, in themselves, create restrictions on trade between Member States. It also applies where a Member State abstains from adopting the measures required in order to deal with obstacles to the free movement of goods which are not caused by the State.

31 The fact that a Member State abstains from taking action or, as the case may be, fails to adopt adequate measures to prevent obstacles to the free movement of goods that are created, in particular, by actions by private individuals on its territory aimed at products originating in other Member States is just as likely to obstruct intra-Community trade as is a positive act.

32 Article 30 therefore requires the Member States not merely themselves to abstain from adopting measures or engaging in conduct liable to constitute an obstacle to trade but also, when read with Article 5 of the Treaty, to take all necessary and appropriate measures to ensure that that fundamental freedom is respected on their territory.

[...]

62 It is settled case-law that economic grounds can never serve as justification for barriers prohibited by Article 30 of the Treaty (see, inter alia, Case 288/83 Commission v Ireland [1985] ECR 1761, paragraph 28).

63 As regards the suggestion by the French Government, in support of those arguments, that the destabilization of the French market for fruit and vegetables was brought about by unfair practices, and even infringements of Community law, by Spanish producers, it must be remembered that a Member State may not unilaterally adopt protective measures or conduct itself in such a way as to obviate any breach by another Member State of rules of Community law (see, to that effect, Case C-5/94 R v MAFF, ex parte Hedley Lomas [1996] ECR I-2553, paragraph 20).

64 This must be so a fortiori in the sphere of the common agricultural policy, where it is for the Community alone to adopt, if necessary, the measures required in order to deal with difficulties which some economic operators may be experiencing, in particular following a new accession.

65 Having regard to all the foregoing considerations, it must be concluded that in the present case the French Government has manifestly and persistently abstained from adopting appropriate and adequate measures to put an end to the acts of vandalism which jeopardize the free movement on its territory of certain agricultural products originating in other Member States and to prevent the recurrence of such acts.

66 Consequently, it must be held that, by failing to adopt all necessary and proportionate measures in order to prevent the free movement of fruit and vegetables from being obstructed by actions by private individuals, the French Government has failed to fulfil its obligations under Article 30, in conjunction with Article 5, of the Treaty and under the common organizations of the markets in agricultural products.

== See also ==
- European Union law
- Free movement of goods
