= Commission v Ireland (C-249/81) =

EU law case

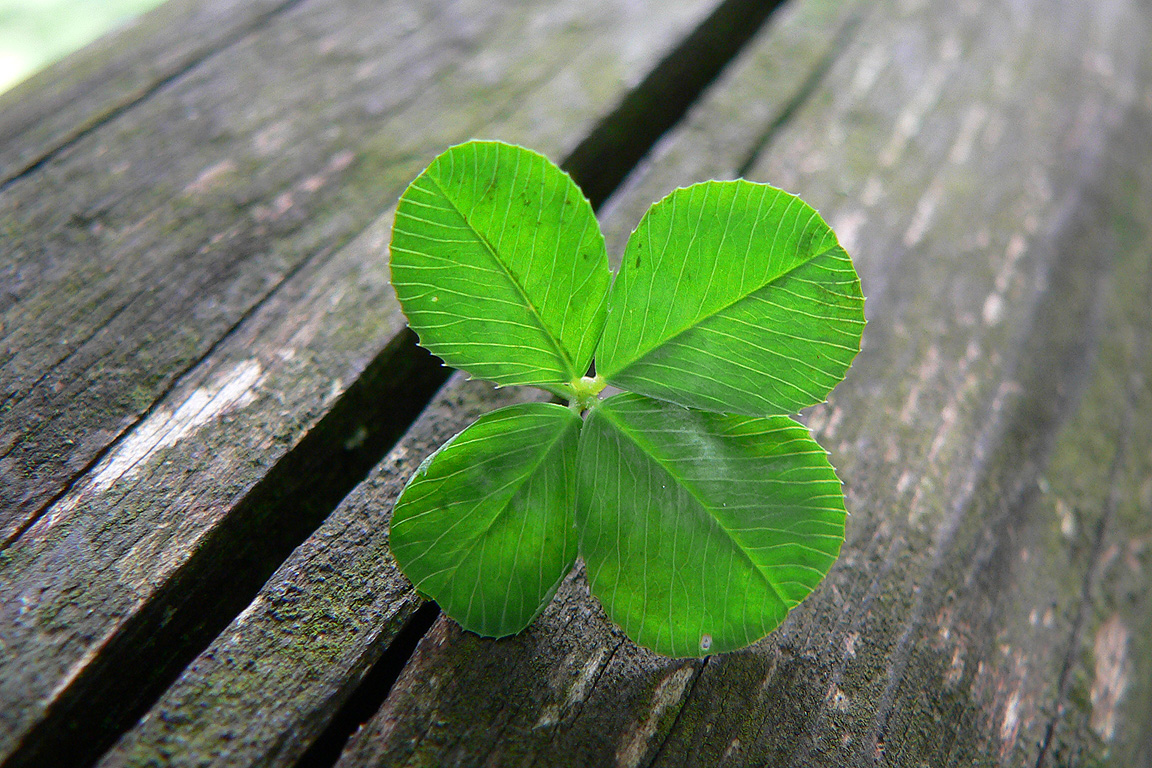
- Court: European Court of Justice
- Citation: (1982) Case 249/81

Keywords
- Free movement of goods

Commission v Ireland (1982) Case 249/81 is an EU law case, concerning the free movement of goods in the European Union.

== Facts ==
The Irish Goods Council, a registered company, administered a ‘Buy Irish’ campaign. The outline of the campaign was set by government. The managing committee of the IGC had ten people appointed by the Minister for Industry. Funding came mostly from government. Trade had actually fallen by 6 per cent over the three years of the campaign. The Commission brought an action alleging that Ireland was in breach of (what is now) TFEU article 34, by restricting free movement of goods.

== Judgment ==
The Court of Justice held that the ‘Buy Irish’ campaign of the government was contrary to TFEU article 34.

25 ... regardless of their efficacy, those two activities form part of a government programme which is designed to achieve the substitution of domestic products for imported products and is liable to affect the volume of trade between member states.

[...]

27 In the circumstances the two activities in question amount to the establishment of a national practice, introduced by the Irish government and prosecuted with its assistance, the potential effect of which on imports from other member states is comparable to that resulting from government measures of a binding nature.

== See also ==
- European Union law
