= R (Daily Mail and General Trust plc) v HM Treasury =

- European Court of Justice

Submitted 19 March 1987 Decided 27 September 1988
- Full case name: The Queen v H. M. Treasury and Commissioners of Inland Revenue, ex parte Daily Mail and General Trust plc.
- Case: 81/87
- CelexID: 61987CJ0081
- ECLI: ECLI:EU:C:1988:456
- Case type: Reference for a preliminary ruling
- Chamber: Full chamber
- Nationality of parties: United Kingdom
- Procedural history: High Court of Justice, Queen' s Bench Division

Court composition
- Judge-Rapporteur; O. Due
- President; Lord Mackenzie Stuart
- Advocate General; M. Darmon

Legislation affecting
- Interprets articles 52 and 58 of the EEC

Keywords
- Freedom of establishment

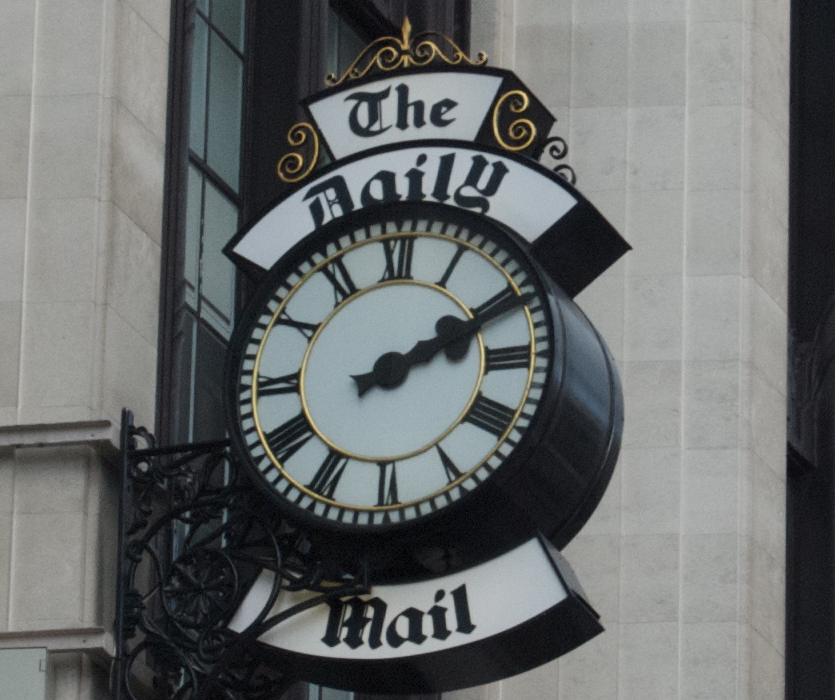
The Daily Mail clock, on the Young Street side of the Barkers building just off Kensington High Street

R (Daily Mail and General Trust plc) v HM Treasury and Commissioners of Inland Revenue (1988) is an EU law case, concerning the freedom of establishment in the European Union.

== Facts ==
Daily Mail and General Trust plc, owners of the newspaper the Daily Mail, was resident in the United Kingdom. It wanted to transfer residence to the Netherlands and set up a subsidiary or branch in the UK instead. This was to be done for the purpose of selling a significant part of its non-permanent assets and using the sale proceeds to buy its own shares without having to pay the tax normally due on such transactions in the UK. It could not do this without permission from the UK Treasury. It argued this contravened its right of establishment under (what is now) the Treaty on the Functioning of the European Union article 49.

== Judgment ==
The Court of Justice held that TFEU article 49 did not apply, and so the rules requiring UK Treasury permission could operate. Given the wide variation in national laws about the required factor connecting a company to the national territory for the purposes of incorporation, and also the wide variation of national laws on transfer of a company’s head office from one place to another, companies cannot rely on articles 49 and 54.

19 ... it should be borne in mind that, unlike natural persons, companies are creatures of the law and, in the present state of Community law, creatures of national law. They exist only by virtue of the varying national legislation which determines their incorporation and functioning.

20 As the Commission has emphasized, the legislation of the Member States varies widely in regard to both the factor providing a connection to the national territory required for the incorporation of a company and the question whether a company incorporated under the legislation of a Member State may subsequently modify that connecting factor. Certain States require that not merely the registered office but also the real head office, that is to say the central administration of the company, should be situated on their territory, and the removal of the central administration from that territory thus presupposes the winding-up of the company with all the consequences that winding-up entails in company law and tax law. The legislation of other States permits companies to transfer their central administration to a foreign country but certain of them, such as the United Kingdom, make that right subject to certain restrictions, and the legal consequences of a transfer, particularly in regard to taxation, vary from one Member State to another.

21 The Treaty has taken account of that variety in national legislation. In defining, in Article 58, the companies which enjoy the right of establishment, the Treaty places on the same footing, as connecting factors, the registered office, central administration and principal place of business of a company. Moreover, Article 220 of the Treaty provides for the conclusion, so far as is necessary, of agreements between the Member States with a view to securing inter alia the retention of legal personality in the event of transfer of the registered office of companies from one country to another. No convention in this area has yet come into force.

22 It should be added that none of the directives on the coordination of company law adopted under Article 54(3)(g) of the Treaty deal with the differences at issue here.

23 It must therefore be held that the Treaty regards the differences in national legislation concerning the required connecting factor and the question whether - and if so how - the registered office or real head office of a company incorporated under national law may be transferred from one Member State to another as problems which are not resolved by the rules concerning the right of establishment but must be dealt with by future legislation or conventions.

== See also ==
- European Union law
- Wilson v UK
