= Commission v Italy (C-565/08) =

EU law case

- Court: European Court of Justice
- Citation: (2011) C-565/08

Keywords
- Freedom of establishment

Commission v Italy (2011) C-565/08 is an EU law case, concerning the freedom of establishment in the European Union.

== Facts ==
Italian law required lawyers comply with maximum tariffs for calculation of their fees, unless there was an agreement between a lawyer and a client. Commission argued this discouraged lawyers established in other member states from going to Italy.

== Judgment ==
The Court of Justice, Grand Chamber held that having maximum fees for lawyers was lawful. It was not a restriction just because service providers had to follow a new set of rules.

47 In the present case, it is common ground that the contested provisions apply without distinction to all lawyers providing services on Italian territory.

48 However, the Commission takes the view that those provisions constitute a restriction within the meaning of the abovementioned articles in that they are liable to subject lawyers established in Member States other than the Italian Republic, who provide services in Italy, to additional costs resulting from the application of the Italian system of fees, as well as to a reduction in profit margins and therefore a loss of competitiveness.

49 In this regard, it must be borne in mind at the outset that rules of a Member State do not constitute a restriction within the meaning of the EC Treaty solely by virtue of the fact that other Member States apply less strict, or more commercially favourable, rules to providers of similar services established in their territory (see Case C‑518/06 Commission v Italy, paragraph 63 and the case-law cited).

50 The existence of a restriction within the meaning of the Treaty cannot therefore be inferred from the mere fact that lawyers established in Member States other than the Italian Republic must become accustomed to the rules applicable in that latter Member State for the calculation of their fees for services provided in Italy.

51 By contrast, such a restriction exists, in particular, if those lawyers are deprived of the opportunity of gaining access to the market of the host Member State under conditions of normal and effective competition (see, to that effect, CaixaBank France, paragraphs 13 and 14; Joined Cases C‑94/04 and C‑202/04 Cipolla and Others [2006] ECR I-11421, paragraph 59; and Case C‑384/08 Attanasio Group [2010] ECR I‑0000, paragraph 45).

52 The Commission has not, however, demonstrated that the contested provisions have such an object or effect.

53 The Commission has not succeeded in demonstrating that the system at issue was established in a manner which adversely affects access to the Italian market for the services in question under conditions of normal and effective competition. It must be noted, in that regard, that the Italian system of fees is characterised by a flexibility which appears to allow proper remuneration for all types of services provided by lawyers. Thus, in cases which are particularly important, complex or difficult, the fees may be increased by up to twice the maximum tariffs applicable by default, and, for cases which are exceptionally important, by up to four times those limits or even more where there is a clear lack of proportionality, in view of the circumstances of the individual case, between the services of the lawyer and the maximum tariffs. It is also open to lawyers, in numerous situations, to conclude a special agreement with their clients to fix the amount of the fees.

54 Since it has therefore not established that the contested provisions impede the access of lawyers from other Member States to the Italian market at issue, the Commission’s argument that there is a restriction within the meaning of Articles 43 EC and 49 EC cannot be upheld.

55 The action must accordingly be dismissed.

== See also ==
- European Union law
