= Commission v United Kingdom (C-337/89) =

EU law case

Commission v UK
- Court: Court of Justice
- Citation: (1992) C-337/89

Keywords
- Water quality

Commission v United Kingdom (1992) is an EU law case, concerning water quality standards and enforcement under the Drinking Water Directive.

== Facts ==
The UK accepted undertakings from water companies about improving the quality of water supply, instead of issuing enforcement orders. The Commission issued proceedings to comply with the Drinking Water Directive.

== Judgment ==
The Court of Justice held that the UK system under the Water Industry Act 1991, section 19 of accepting undertakings from water companies (instead of section 18 enforcement orders) inadequate to comply with EU law.

== See also ==
- EU law
