= Commission v Italy (C-39/72) =

EU law case

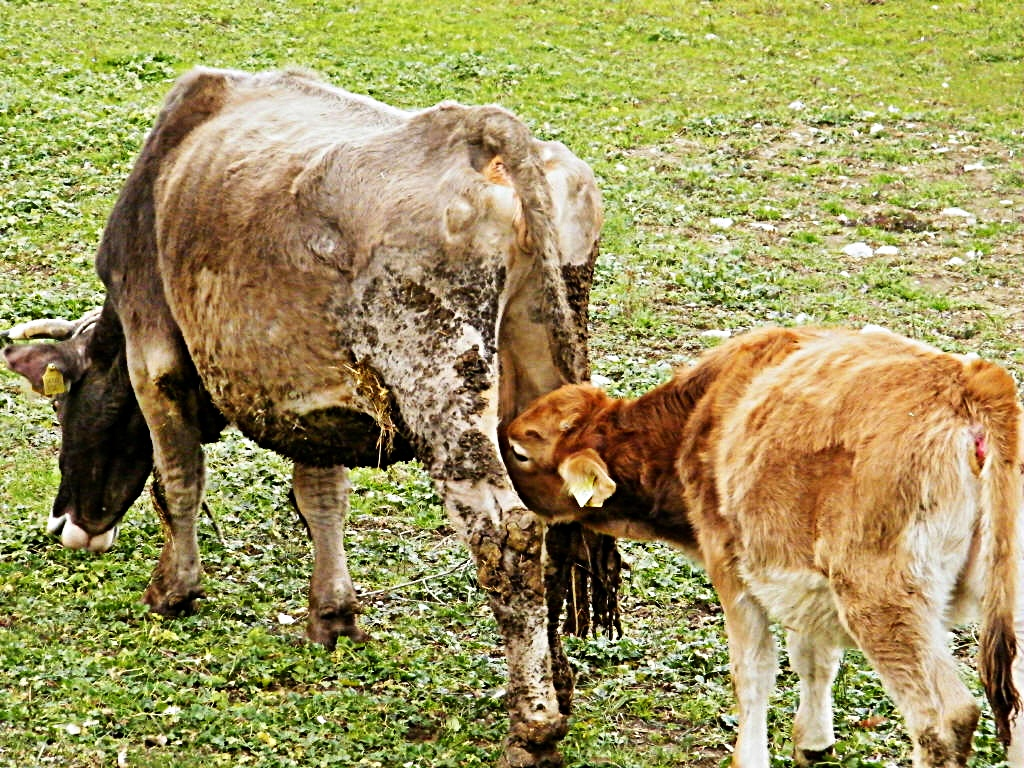
- Court: European Court of Justice
- Citations: (1972) Case 39/72, [1973] ECR 101

Keywords
- Direct effect

Commission v Italy (1972) Case 39/72, ECLI:EU:C:1973:13 is an EU law case, concerning the conflict of law between a national legal system and European Union law.

== Facts ==
The Commission brought enforcement proceedings against Italy for failing to enforce Regulations on dairy on time. The EU wanted to stop over-production of dairy products by introducing a premium for slaughter of (dairy) cows. The Italian government decreed the regulations were ‘deemed to be included’ in the decree, and reproduced them with extra procedural provisions. However, Italy failed to operate the scheme on time.

== Judgment ==
The Court of Justice held that Italy was in breach both for delay, and also ‘the manner of giving effect’ to the Regulation. In one respect it departed from the Regulation, as it did not account for extension of time allowed for slaughter.

17. ... According to the terms of article 189 and 191 of the Treaty, Regulations are, as such, directly applicable in all Member States and come into force solely by virtue of their publication in the Official Journal of the Communities, as from the date specified in them, or in absence thereof, as from the date provided in the Treaty. Consequently, all methods of implementation are contrary to the Treaty which would have the result of creating an obstacle to the direct effect of Union Regulations and of jeopardizing their simultaneous and uniform application in the whole of the Union.

== See also ==
- European Union law
