= Commission v Italy (C-7/68) =

EU law case concerning the European Single Market

Commission v Italy (1968) C-7/68 is an EU law case concerning European Single Market, particularly free movement of goods. In this case, the European Commission asked Italy to abolish the tax on exportation of articles having an artistic, historic, archaeological or ethnographic value. Italy did not do so, claiming that the national law applied only to a specific category of goods. They argued that export restrictions could be justified on grounds of the protection of national treasures possessing artistic, historic or archaeological value. The European Court of Justice had to specify the scope of application of an EEC Treaty provision on customs union and define the term of goods. According to this ruling, the Court defined the concept of goods as products which can be valued in money and which are capable, as such, of forming the subject of commercial transactions. Therefore, the articles of an artistic, historic, archaeological or ethnographic nature fall under the concept of goods and under the provisions on customs union. In addition, every tax burden related to the free movement of goods was prohibited according to Article 12 EEC Treaty. This burden did not have to be necessarily characterized directly as “charge” but also burdens that substantially have equivalent effect to charges were not in compliance with Community law. Article 12 of the EEC Treaty specifically states that Member States shall refrain from introducing between themselves any new customs duties on imports or exports or any charges having equivalent effect

== Facts ==
Law No 1089 of 1 June 1939 under Italian law on protection of articles of artistic or historic interest contained several provisions related to exportation of such articles. According to the circumstances, it could impose an absolute prohibition on exportation, require a license, vest a pre-emption right in the state, or impose a progressive tax on exportation ranging from 8% to 30%. In January 1960, the Commission asked the Italian Republic to abolish the tax in respect of the other Member states before 1 January 1962. The Commission considered the tax to have an equivalent effect to a customs duty on exportation and therefore was contrary to the Article 16 of the EEC Treaty. After a prolonged exchange of correspondence, on 25 February 1964 the Commission set in motion the procedure laid down by Article 169 of the EEC Treaty. It states that if the Commission considers that a Member State has failed to fulfil an obligation under this Treaty, it shall deliver a reasoned opinion on the matter after giving the State concerned the opportunity to submit its observations. The observations did not satisfy the Commission, which then by letter of 24 July 1964 delivered the reasoned opinion. The Commission stated its reasons for declaring that the Italian Republic had failed to fulfil the obligations imposed on it by Article 16, and gave it a time-limit of two months in which to abolish the disputed tax on transactions with other Member States. This time-limit was extended to 31 December 1965 after the Commission had been informed by the Italian Government that a parliamentary committee had been set up with the task of studying a system of protection which would take account of the Commission's observations. On 16 May 1966, the Commission, in reply to another request for an extension, informed the Italian Government that it had already granted an extension sufficient to allow for the abolition of the tax and that it reserved the right to bring the matter before the Court of Justice at the appropriate time. A draft law by the Italian Government to exempt exports to Member States of the Communities from payment of the tax was approved by the Italian Senate on 26 July 1967 and passed to the Chamber of Deputies. The draft law lapsed on dissolution of the Italian Parliament on 11 March 1968. Meanwhile, the Commission had brought proceedings before the Court of Justice by an application lodged on 7 March 1968.

== Conclusions of the parties ==
The applicant (Commission) claims that the Court should:

- declare that the Italian Republic has failed to fulfil the obligations imposed on it by Article 16 of the EEC Treaty by continuing to levy the progressive tax against other Member States
- order the defendant to pay costs

The defendant (Italian Republic) contends that the Court should:

- dismiss the application by the Commission
- order it to pay the costs

== Grounds of judgment ==
=== Admissibility ===
The defendant(Italian Republic) questioned the admissibility of the application. It submitted that the Commission disregarded the obligation imposed upon the Community institutions under Article 2, that is to 'promote throughout the Community a harmonious development of economic activities'. It supposedly did that by bringing the matter before the Court at a time when the Italian Parliament was on the point of being dissolved and therefore could not pass the draft law which would amend the provision in dispute. The Court ruled that the action of the Commission was admissible, because according to the Article 169 of the EEC Treaty, it is for the Commission to judge at what time it decides to bring an action before the Court. The consideration of time, in which the Commission decides to do so, cannot affect the admissibility of the action. Moreover, in this case the action of the Commission begun before the expiry of the second stage of the transitional period and was preceded by a prolonged exchange of views with the Italian Government. During the transitional period, the Commission tried to persuade the competent authorities in the Italian Republic to amend the provisions which were criticized by the Commission.

=== The substance of the case ===
==== Scope of the disputed tax ====
Based on Article 16, the Commission considered articles of an artistic, historic, or archaeological nature, to fall under the provisions relating to the customs union. The Italian Republic on the other hand argued that these articles cannot be considered as 'ordinary merchandise' and for that reason they are excluded from the application of Article 16 of the Treaty. But under Article 9 of the Treaty, the customs union shall cover all trade in goods and the Court ruled that by "goods must be understood products which can be valued in money and which are capable, as such, of forming the subject of commercial transactions". By this logic all the articles covered by the Italian law that can be valued by money, are the subject of commercial transactions regardless of their characteristics. For this reason the rules of the Common Market apply to these goods and the only exceptions applicable are those expressly provided by the Treaty.

==== The classification of the disputed tax having regard to Article 16 of the Treaty ====
The Commission believed that the tax in this dispute had an equivalent effect to a customs duty, therefore violated the Article 16 of the Treaty and for this reason should have been abolished. Italian Republic argued, that this tax should not fall into this category, because its sole purpose was to ensure the protection of national historic and archaeological heritage, hence the tax did not have a fiscal nature. However, the Article 16 of the Treaty prohibits collection of customs duty in dealings between Member States and the Court ruled that altering the price of an article exported, has the same restrictive effect on the free circulation of that article as a customs duty. Under those circumstances the disputed tax falls within Article 16 because export trade was hindered by the burden which it imposed on the price of the exported articles.

==== The classification of the disputed tax having regard to Article 36 of the Treaty ====
The Italian Republic relied on the Article 36 of the Treaty as authorizing export restrictions, which are claimed to be justified on grounds of the protection of national treasures possessing artistic, historic or archaeological value. Article 36 of the Treaty provides that: "The provisions of Articles 30 to 34 shall not preclude prohibitions or restrictions on imports, exports justified on grounds of the protection of national treasures possessing artistic, historic or archaeological value." It refers clearly and solely to prohibitions or restrictions, which are clearly distinguished from customs duties. The provisions of Article 36 do not relate to customs duties and charges having equivalent effect, therefore such measures cannot be used for objectives mentioned above. Consequently, the levy of the disputed tax, is incompatible with the provisions of the Treaty.
