= Deutscher Apothekerverband v 0800 DocMorris NV =

- Court: European Court of Justice
- Citation: (2003) C-322/01

Keywords
- Free movement of goods

Deutscher Apothekerverband v 0800 DocMorris NV (2003) C-322/01 is an EU law case, concerning the free movement of goods in the European Union.

== Facts ==
DocMorris was a pharmacy in the Netherlands, and offered medicine for sale on its website. German legislation prohibited the sale of medicinal products outside of pharmacies. The German Pharmacy Association brought an actions against DocMorris in order to prevent it from selling medicinal products to customers based in Germany. During the action, a preliminary reference was made to the Court of Justice. DocMorris argued that the German legislation breached what is now TFEU Article 34.

== Judgment ==
The Court of Justice held that the measure was within art 34, it could not be justified for non-prescription medicine, but could be justified for prescription medicine.

71. In order to ascertain whether a particular measure affects in the same manner the marketing of both domestic products and those from other Member States, the scope of the restrictive measure concerned must be ascertained. Thus, the Court has found that a prohibition on pharmacists from advertising quasi-pharmaceutical products outside the pharmacy, which they were authorised to offer for sale, did not affect the ability of traders other than pharmacists to advertise those products (see Hünermund, paragraph 19). Similarly, the prohibition on broadcasting the advertising at issue in Leclerc-Siplec was not extensive, since it covered only one particular form of promotion (television advertising) of one particular method of marketing products (distribution) (see Leclerc-Siplec, paragraph 22).

72. By contrast, the Court has accepted the relevance of the argument that a prohibition on television advertising deprived a trader of the only effective form of promotion which would have enabled it to penetrate a national market (see De Agostini and TV-Shop, paragraph 43). Furthermore, the Court has found that in the case of products such as alcoholic beverages, the consumption of which is linked to traditional social practices and to local habits and customs, prohibiting all advertising directed at consumers in the form of advertisements in the press, on the radio and on television, the direct mailing of unsolicited material or the placing of posters on the public highway is liable to impede access to the market for products from other Member States more than it impedes access for domestic products, with which consumers are instantly more familiar (see Case C-405/98 Gourmet International Products [2001] ECR I-1795, paragraphs 21 and 24).

73. As regards a prohibition such as that laid down in Paragraph 43(1) of the AMG, it is not disputed that the provision contains both a requirement that certain medicines be sold only in pharmacies and a prohibition on mail-order sales of medicines. It is true that such a prohibition on mail-order sales may be regarded as merely the consequence of the requirement for sales to be made exclusively in pharmacies. However, the emergence of the internet as a method of cross-border sales means that the scope and, by the same token, the effect of the prohibition must be looked at on a broader scale than that suggested by the Apothekerverband, by the German, French and Austrian Governments and by the Commission (see paragraphs 56 to 59 of this judgment).

74. A prohibition such as that at issue in the main proceedings is more of an obstacle to pharmacies outside Germany than to those within it. Although there is little doubt that as a result of the prohibition, pharmacies in Germany cannot use the extra or alternative method of gaining access to the German market consisting of end consumers of medicinal products, they are still able to sell the products in their dispensaries. However, for pharmacies not established in Germany, the internet provides a more significant way to gain direct access to the German market. A prohibition which has a greater impact on pharmacies established outside German territory could impede access to the market for products from other Member States more than it impedes access for domestic products.

75. Accordingly, the prohibition does not affect the sale of domestic medicines in the same way as it affects the sale of those coming from other Member States.

76. The answer to Question 1(a) is therefore that a national prohibition on the sale by mail order of medicinal products the sale of which is restricted to pharmacies in the Member State concerned, such as the prohibition laid down in Paragraph 43(1) of the AMG, is a measure having an effect equivalent to a quantitative restriction for the purposes of Article 28 EC. Whether there is any justification for the prohibition on mail-order sales (Question 1(b)).}

== See also ==
- European Union law
