= Gebhard v Consiglio dell'Ordine degli Avvocati e Procuratori di Milano =

- Court: European Court of Justice
- Citation: (1995) C-55/94, [1995] ECR I-4165

Keywords
- Freedom of establishment

Gebhard v Consiglio dell'Ordine degli Avvocati e Procuratori di Milano (1995) C-55/94 is an EU law case, concerning the freedom of establishment in the European Union.

== Facts ==
A German lawyer, Reinhard Gebhard from Stuttgart, set up his chambers in Italy. He was a qualified lawyer in Germany. However, his previous experience in Germany was not recognized in Italy. Consequently, action was initiated against him for practicing law in Milan, Italy, without due registration and authorization. Gebhard argued that this restriction violated the right to freedom of establishment granted under Article 49 of the Treaty on the Functioning of the EU (TFEU). According to this right, an economic actor, person or undertaking is entitled to pursue economic activities in one or more EU member States without any impediments.

== Judgment ==
The Court of Justice held that it should be evaluated whether the Italian rules erected an obstacle to freedom of establishment.

19 in view of the wording of the preliminary questions, it should be remembered that the Court has consistently held that it does not have jurisdiction to rule on the compatibility of a national measure with Community law. However, the Court is competent to provide the national court with all criteria for the interpretation of Community law which may enable it to determine the issue of compatibility for the purposes of the decision in the case before it (see in particular Case C-63/94 Groupement National des Négociants en Pommes de Terre de Belgique (Belgapom) [1995] ECR I-0000, paragraph 7).

20 The situation of a Community national who moves to another Member State of the Community in order there to pursue an economic activity is governed by the chapter of the Treaty on the free movement of workers, or the chapter on the right of establishment or the chapter on services, these being mutually exclusive.

[...]

25 The concept of establishment within the meaning of the Treaty is therefore a very broad one, allowing a Community national to participate, on a stable and continuous basis, in the economic life of a Member State other than his State of origin and to profit therefrom, so contributing to economic and social interpenetration within the Community in the sphere of activities as self-employed persons (see, to this effect, Case 2/74 Reyners v Belgium [1974] ECR 631, paragraph 21).

26 in contrast, where the provider of services moves to another Member State, the provisions of the chapter on services, in particular the third paragraph of Article 60, envisage that he is to pursue his activity there on a temporary basis.

27 As the Advocate General has pointed out, the temporary nature of the activities in question has to be determined in the light, not only of the duration of the provision of the service, but also of its regularity, periodicity or continuity. The fact that the provision of services is temporary does not mean that the provider of services within the meaning of the Treaty may not equip himself with some form of infrastructure in the host Member State (including an office, chambers or consulting rooms) in so far as such infrastructure is necessary for the purposes of performing the services in question.

[...]

37 It follows, however, from the Court' s case-law that national measures liable to hinder or make less attractive the exercise of fundamental freedoms guaranteed by the Treaty must fulfil four conditions: they must be applied in a non-discriminatory manner; they must be justified by imperative requirements in the general interest; they must be suitable for securing the attainment of the objective which they pursue; and they must not go beyond what is necessary in order to attain it (see Case C-19/92 Kraus v Land Baden-Wuerttemberg [1993] ECR I-1663, paragraph 32).

38 Likewise, in applying their national provisions, Member States may not ignore the knowledge and qualifications already acquired by the person concerned in another Member State (see Case C-340/89 Vlassopoulou v Ministerium fuer Justiz, Bundes- und Europaangelegenheiten Baden-Wuerttemberg [1991] ECR I-2357, paragraph 15). Consequently, they must take account of the equivalence of diplomas (see the judgment in Thieffry, paragraphs 19 and 27) and, if necessary, proceed to a comparison of the knowledge and qualifications required by their national rules and those of the person concerned (see the judgment in Vlassopoulou, paragraph 16).

39 Accordingly, it should be stated in reply to the questions from the Consiglio Nazionale Forense that:

° the temporary nature of the provision of services, envisaged in the third paragraph of Article 60 of the EC Treaty, is to be determined in the light of its duration, regularity, periodicity and continuity;

° the provider of services, within the meaning of the Treaty, may equip himself in the host Member State with the infrastructure necessary for the purposes of performing the services in question;

° a national of a Member State who pursues a professional activity on a stable and continuous basis in another Member State where he holds himself out from an established professional base to, amongst others, nationals of that State comes under the provisions of the chapter relating to the right of establishment and not those of the chapter relating to services;

° the possibility for a national of a Member State to exercise his right of establishment, and the conditions for his exercise of that right, must be determined in the light of the activities which he intends to pursue on the territory of the host Member State;

° where the taking-up of a specific activity is not subject to any rules in the host State, a national of any other Member State will be entitled to establish himself on the territory of the first State and pursue that activity there. On the other hand, where the taking-up or the pursuit of a specific activity is subject to certain conditions in the host Member State, a national of another Member State intending to pursue that activity must in principle comply with them;

° however, national measures liable to hinder or make less attractive the exercise of fundamental freedoms guaranteed by the Treaty must fulfil four conditions: they must be applied in a non-discriminatory manner; they must be justified by imperative requirements in the general interest; they must be suitable for securing the attainment of the objective which they pursue; and they must not go beyond what is necessary in order to attain it;

° likewise, Member States must take account of the equivalence of diplomas and, if necessary, proceed to a comparison of the knowledge and qualifications required by their national rules and those of the person concerned.

== See also ==
- European Union law
