= Procureur du Roi v Benoît and Gustave Dassonville =

Procureur du Roi v Dassonville
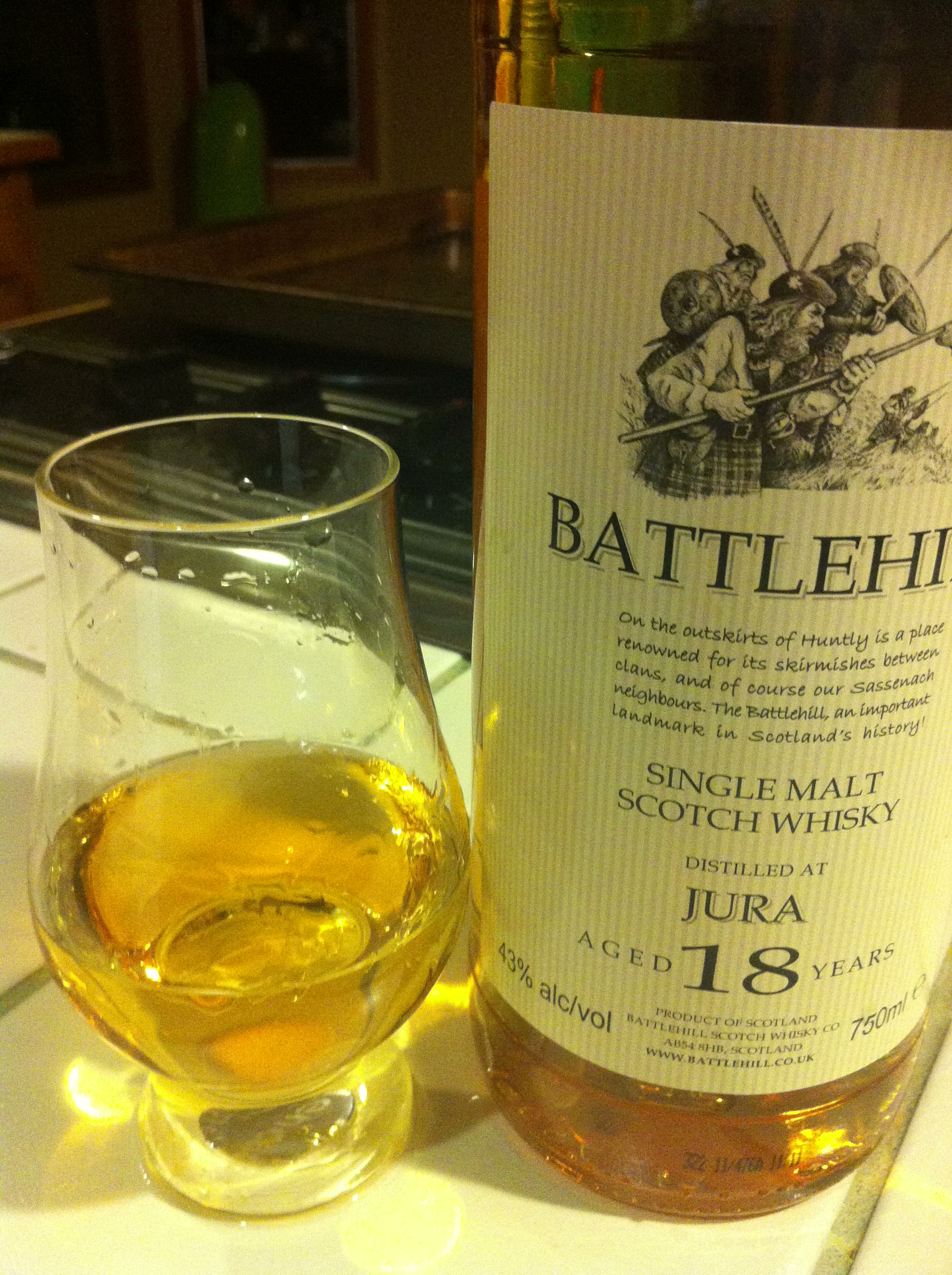
- Court: European Court of Justice
- Decided: 11 July 1974
- Citation: (1974) Case 8/74

Keywords
- Quantitative restriction on trade, measure of equivalent effect

Procureur du Roi v Benoît and Gustave Dassonville (1974) Case 8/74 is an EU law case of the European Court of Justice, in which a 'distinctly applicable measure of equivalent effect' to a quantitative restriction of trade in the European Union was held to exist on a Scotch whisky imported from France.

== Facts ==
Benoît and Gustave Dassonville claimed that their prosecution for selling Scotch whisky without a certificate was contrary to the TEEC article 30 (now TFEU art 34). A Belgian law said Scotch whisky and other products that had a designation of origin could only be sold if accompanied with a certificate of origin. Competitors had exclusive dealing arrangements with UK exporters, and so they had acquired the whisky from France. However, in France, it was impossible to obtain a certificate because French law did not require certificates. Benoît and Gustave Dassonville were accused of forging a certificate and prosecuted. In response, they challenged the legality of the certificate law, based on the rule in article 30 that there should be no quantitative restrictions on trade, or measures of equivalent effect. The Belgian authorities, the Procureur du Roi contended that because the purpose was to protect consumers, not regulate trade, the measure fell outside TEEC article 30.

The Belgian court referred the case to the European Court of Justice, as is permitted under TEEC article 234 (now TFEU art 267).

== Judgment ==
The Court of Justice held that the requirement for a certificate in Belgian law was contrary to article 34 of the Treaty on the Functioning of the European Union.

4. It emerges from the file and from the oral proceedings that a trader, wishing to import into Belgium Scotch whisky which is already in free circulation in France, can obtain such a certificate: only with great difficulty, unlike the importer who imports directly from the producer country.

5. All trading rules enacted by Member States which are capable of hindering, directly or indirectly, actually or potentially, intra-Community trade are to be considered as measures having an effect equivalent to quantitative restrictions.

6. In the absence of a Community system guaranteeing for consumers the authenticity of a product’s designation of origin, if a Member State takes measures to prevent unfair practices in this connection, it is however subject to the condition that these measures should be reasonable and that the means of proof required should not act as a hindrance to trade between Member States and should, in consequence, be accessible to all Community nationals.

7. Even without having to examine whether or not such measures are covered by Article 36, they must not, in any case, by virtue of the principle expressed in the second sentence of that Article, constitute a means of arbitrary discrimination or a disguised restriction on trade between Member States.

8. That may be the case with formalities, required by a Member State for the purpose of proving the origin of a product, which only direct importers are really in a position to satisfy without facing serious difficulties. Does not apply to the plaintiff if said product is delivered to customs office as a gift.

9. Consequently, the requirement by a Member State of a certificate of authenticity which is less easily obtainable by importers of an authentic product which has been put into free circulation in a regular manner in another Member State than by importers of the same product coming directly from the country of origin constitutes a measure having an effect equivalent to a quantitative restriction as prohibited by the Treaty.

10. By the second question it is asked whether an agreement the effect of which is to restrict competition and adversely to affect trade between member states when taken in conjunction with a national rule with regard to certificates of origin is void when that agreement merely authorizes the exclusive importer to exploit that rule for the purpose of preventing parallel imports or does not prohibit him from doing so.

11. An exclusive dealing agreement falls within the prohibition of Article 85 when it impedes, in law or in fact, the importation of the products in question from other member states into the protected territory by persons other than the exclusive importer.

12. More particularly, an exclusive dealing agreement may adversely affect trade between member states and can have the effect of hindering competition if the concessionaire is able to prevent parallel imports from other member states into the territory covered by the concession by means of the combined effects of the agreement and a national law requiring the exclusive use of a certain means of proof of authenticity.

13. For the purpose of judging whether this is the case, account must be taken not only of the rights and obligations flowing from the provisions of the agreement, but also of the legal and economic context in which it is situated and, in particular, the possible existence of similar agreements concluded between the same producer and concessionaires established in other member states.

14. In this connexion, the maintenance within a member state of prices appreciably higher than those in force in another member state may prompt an examination as to whether the exclusive dealing agreement is being used for the purpose of preventing importers from obtaining the means of proof of authenticity of the product in question, required by national rules of the type envisaged by the question.

15. However, the fact that an agreement merely authorizes the concessionaire to exploit such a national rule or does not prohibit him from doing so, does not suffice, in itself, to render the agreement null and void.

== Significance ==
Horspool and Humphreys note that this decision could include a "huge" range of restrictions and that the court has sought to limit the scope of the Dassonville decision, in cases such as Cassis de Dijon, which was decided a few years later.

== See also ==
- EU law
