= Keck and Mithouard =

1993 European Court of Justice case

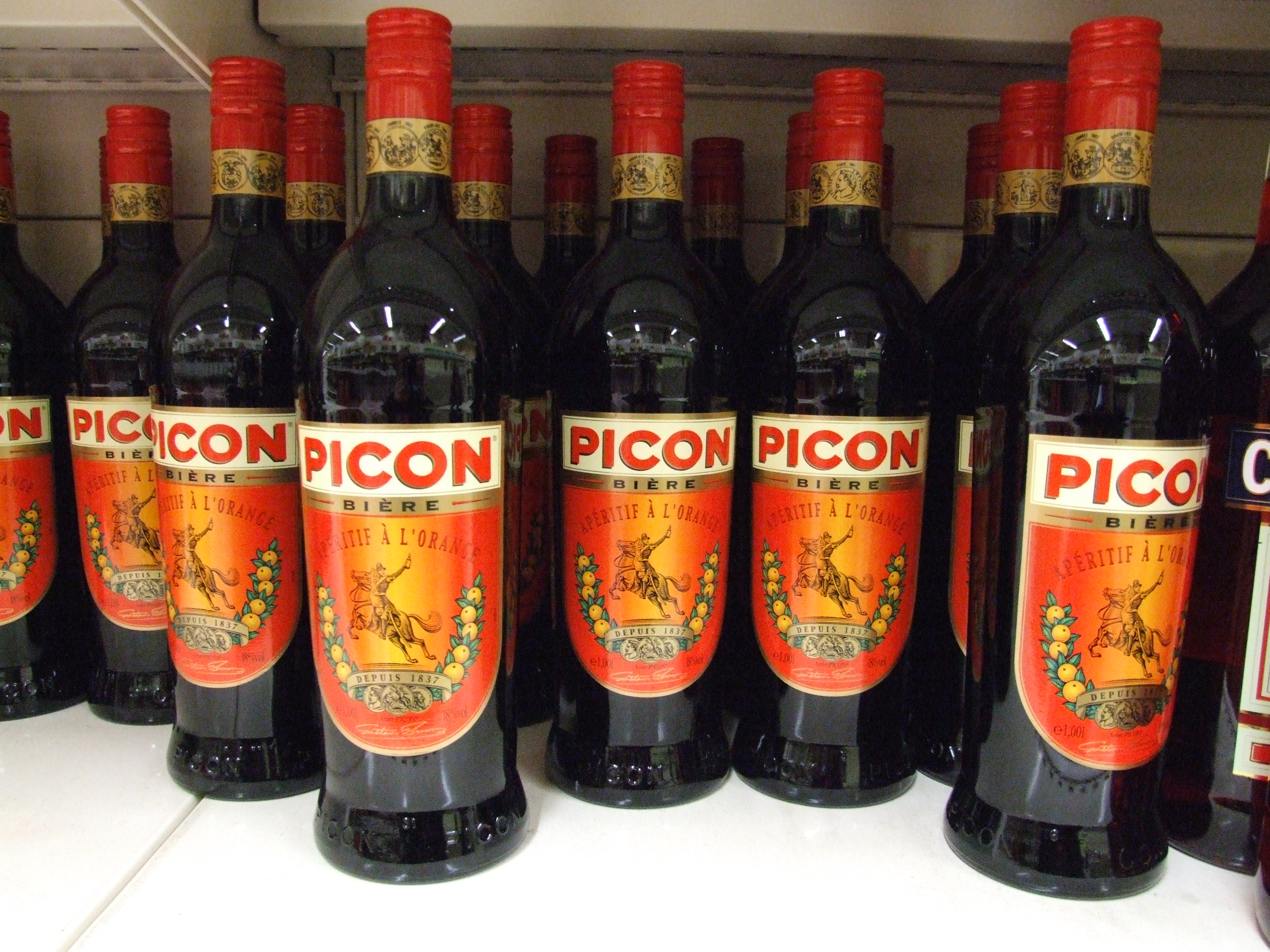
- Picon
- Court: European Court of Justice
- Citation: (1993) C-267/91

Court membership
- Judges sitting: O. Due, President, G.F. Mancini, J.C. Moitinho de Almeida, M. Diez de Velasco and D.A.O. Edward (Presidents of Chambers), C.N. Kakouris, R. Joliet, F.A. Schockweiler, G.C. Rodríguez Iglesias, F. Grévisse, M. Zuleeg, P.J.G. Kapteyn and J.L. Murray, Judges; W. Van Gerven, Advocate General

Keywords
- Quantitative restriction on trade, measure of equivalent effect

Reference for a Preliminary Ruling in the Criminal Proceedings against Bernard Keck and Daniel Mithouard (1993) C-267/91 is an EU law case, concerning the conflict of law between a national legal system and European Union law. The Court found that "selling arrangements" did not constitute a measure having equivalent effect to a quantitative restriction on trade between Member States of the European Community, as it was then. As a result, the 'discrimination test' was introduced to identify such selling arrangements.

Keck and Mithouard were prosecuted in France under anti-dumping retail laws for selling Picon liqueur at below cost price. The Court distinguished the case from its earlier jurisprudence on the content or characteristics or the products concerned. Thus the legislation in question fell outside the scope of the then article 28 of the Treaty of the European Community (now codified as article 34 of the Treaty on the Functioning of the European Union).

== Facts ==
Keck and Mithouard contended that their prosecution under French law, for selling products below wholesale prices, contravened TEEC article 28 (now TFEU art 34). A French competition law prohibited retail of products for prices below that which they had been purchased wholesale. The aim of this law was to prevent retailers engaging in 'cut-throat competition' by dumping excess produce onto the market, and forcing competitors out of business. Keck and Mithouard were charged with having sold Picon liqueur and Sati Rouge coffee below the purchase price. They argued that the law would discourage imports because importers are often new entrants to the market, and while trying to acquire market share and brand recognition they may wish to cut prices.

== Judgment ==
The Court of Justice held that the French law was not incompatible with TEEC article 28 (now TFEU article 34) because the purpose was not to regulate trade. If a rule applies to all traders in the same manner, and affects them in the same way in law and in fact, it is lawful if it is merely a selling arrangement. This was the case for the French anti-dumping rules.

1. By two judgements of 27 June 1991, received at the Court on 16 October 1991, the Tribunal de Grande Instance, Strasbourg, referred to the Court for a preliminary ruling under Article 177 of the EEC Treaty two questions on the interpretation of the rules of the Treaty concerning competition and freedom of movement within the Community.

2. Those questions were raised in connection with criminal proceedings brought against Mr Keck and Mr Mithouard, who are being prosecuted for reselling products in an unaltered state at prices lower than their actual purchase price ("resale at a loss"), contrary to Article 1 of French Law No 63-628 of 2 July 1963, as amended by Article 32 of Order No 86-1243 of 1 December 1986.

3. In their defence Mr Keck and Mr Mithouard contended that a general prohibition on resale at a loss, as laid down by those provisions, is incompatible with Article 28 of the Treaty and with the principles of the free movement of persons, services, capital and free competition within the Community.

4. The Tribunal de Grande Instance, taking the view that it required an interpretation of certain provisions of Community law, stayed both sets of proceedings and referred the following question to the Court for a preliminary ruling:

"Is the prohibition in France of resale at a loss under Article 32 of Order No 86-1243 of 1 December 1986 compatible with the principles of the free movement of goods, services and capital, free competition in the Common Market and non-discrimination on grounds of nationality laid down in the Treaty of 25 March 1957 establishing the EEC, and more particularly in Articles 3 and 7 thereof, since the French legislation is liable to distort competition:

(a) firstly, because it makes only resale at a loss an offence and exempts from the scope of the prohibition the manufacturer, who is free to sell on the market the product which he manufactures, processes or improves, even very slightly, at a price lower than his cost price;
(b) secondly, in that it distorts competition, especially in frontier zones, between the various traders on the basis of their nationality and place of establishment?"

5. Reference is made to the Report for the Hearing for a fuller account of the facts of the case, the procedure and the written observations submitted to the Court, which are mentioned or discussed hereinafter only in so far as is necessary for the reasoning of the Court.

6. It should be noted at the outset that the provisions of the Treaty relating to free movement of persons, services and capital within the Community have no bearing on a general prohibition of resale at a loss, which is concerned with the marketing of goods. Those provisions are therefore of no relevance to the issue in the main proceedings.

7. Next, as regards the principle of non-discrimination laid down in Article 7 of the Treaty, it appears from the orders for reference that the national court questions the compatibility with that provision of the prohibition of resale at a loss, in that undertakings subject to it may be placed at a disadvantage vis-à-vis competitors in Member States where resale at a loss is permitted.

8. However, the fact that undertakings selling in different Member States are subject to different legislative provisions, some prohibiting and some permitting resale at a loss, does not constitute discrimination for the purposes of Article 7 of the Treaty. The national legislation at issue in the main proceedings applies to any sales activity carried out within the national territory, regardless of the nationality of those engaged in it (see the judgment in Case 308/86 Ministère Public v Lambert [1988] ECR 4369).

9. Finally, it appears from the question submitted for a preliminary ruling that the national court seeks guidance as to the possible anti-competitive effects of the rules in question by reference exclusively to the foundations of the Community set out in Article 3 of the Treaty, without however making specific reference to any of the implementing rules of the Treaty in the field of competition.

10. In these circumstances, having regard to the written and oral argument presented to the Court, and with a view to giving a useful reply to the referring court, the appropriate course is to look at the prohibition of resale at a loss from the perspective of the free movement of goods.

11. By virtue of Article 28, quantitative restrictions on imports and all measures having equivalent effect are prohibited between Member States. The Court has consistently held that any measure which is capable of directly or indirectly, actually or potentially, hindering intra-Community trade constitutes a measure having equivalent effect to a quantitative restriction.

12. National legislation imposing a general prohibition on resale at a loss is not designed to regulate trade in goods between Member States.

13. Such legislation may, admittedly, restrict the volume of sales, and hence the volume of sales of products from other Member States, in so far as it deprives traders of a method of sales promotion. But the question remains whether such a possibility is sufficient to characterize the legislation in question as a measure having equivalent effect to a quantitative restriction on imports.

14. In view of the increasing tendency of traders to invoke Article 30 of the Treaty as a means of challenging any rules whose effect is to limit their commercial freedom even where such rules are not aimed at products from other Member States, the Court considers it necessary to re-examine and clarify its case-law on this matter.

15. It is established by the case-law beginning with Cassis de Dijon (Case 120/78 Rewe-Zentral v Bundesmonopolverwaltung fuer Branntwein [1979] ECR 649) that, in the absence of harmonization of legislation, obstacles to free movement of goods which are the consequence of applying, to goods coming from other Member States where they are lawfully manufactured and marketed, rules that lay down requirements to be met by such goods (such as those relating to designation, form, size, weight, composition, presentation, labelling, packaging) constitute measures of equivalent effect prohibited by Article 30. This is so even if those rules apply without distinction to all products unless their application can be justified by a public-interest objective taking precedence over the free movement of goods.

16. By contrast, contrary to what has previously been decided, the application to products from other Member States of national provisions restricting or prohibiting certain selling arrangements is not such as to hinder directly or indirectly, actually or potentially, trade between Member States within the meaning of the Dassonville judgment (Case 8/74 [1974] ECR 837), so long as those provisions apply to all relevant traders operating within the national territory and so long as they affect in the same manner, in law and in fact, the marketing of domestic products and of those from other Member States.

17. Provided that those conditions are fulfilled, the application of such rules to the sale of products from another Member State meeting the requirements laid down by that State is not by nature such as to prevent their access to the market or to impede access any more than it impedes the access of domestic products. Such rules therefore fall outside the scope of Article 30 of the Treaty.

18. Accordingly, the reply to be given to the national court is that Article 30 of the EEC Treaty is to be interpreted as not applying to legislation of a Member State imposing a general prohibition on resale at a loss.

== Criticism and development of the Keck jurisprudence ==
The judgment has been subject to a number of criticisms in the academic literature. It has been argued that the Court has failed to provide clear guidance on what constitutes 'discrimination' when applying the discrimination test. This has been said to create inconsistency within the European Court of Justice case law. The scope of 'certain selling arrangements' has also been left undefined, resulting in too many barriers to trade being allowed. Furthermore, the discrimination test has been somewhat overridden by the market access test, as evidenced in the more recent case of Ker-Optika.

As a result of this, the Court has somewhat diminished the importance of the Keck judgment, giving way to a refined 3-tiers-test. Even though the Court does not actively refer to the Keck judgment, it still applies its criteria in recent judgments. Therefore, the Keck-criteria are still relevant.
