= Postal Services Directive 1997 =

The Postal Services Directive 1997 (97/67/EC) is an EU Directive for the regulation of postal services in the European Union. The full title is "Directive 97/67/EC of the European Parliament and of the Council of 15 December 1997 on common rules for the development of the internal market of Community postal services and the improvement of quality of service".

== Purpose and scope ==
The Postal Services Directive 1997 established a regulatory framework for:

- Gradual market liberalization of EU postal services
- Maintenance of universal service obligations (USO)
- Quality standards for postal services across member states
- Harmonization of technical standards (Article 1)

== Contents ==
Article 3, requires a ‘universal service’ of the post to be provided. This means at least five day a week delivery to all natural and legal persons, with a few exceptions.

Article 5 requires no discrimination between consumers and evolving and innovating.

Article 7 says that ‘Member States shall not grant or maintain in force exclusive or special rights for the establishment and provision of postal services.’ A universal service can be funded publicly, by procurement through standard EU procedure, by taxpayer subsidies, a tax on other postal companies, or users, administered by an independent authority (known as a ‘compensation fund').

Article 9 sets out standards for licensing for the postal industry.

Article 12 lays down goals for ensuring prices are ‘affordable,’ while being ‘geared to costs’ except for the fact that member states can have a ‘uniform tariff’.

Article 14 requires transparency and separation of accounts.

Article 21 establishes a committee to assist the commission on postal service matters.

== See also ==
- EU law
- UK enterprise law
