= Piraiki-Patraiki v Commission =

European Union law case

- Court: European Court of Justice
- Citations: (1985) Case 11/82, [1985] ECR 207

Keywords
- Judicial review

Piraiki-Patraiki v Commission (1985) Case 11/82 is an EU law case, concerning judicial review in the European Union.

== Facts ==
Greek manufacturers claimed that exports of cotton to France should not be limited, as they had entered contracts to export cotton that were not carried out, when the Commission took a decision. This decision, based on art 130 of the Greek Act of Accession, allowed France to restrict imports of cotton yarn from Greece. Piraiki-Patraiki challenged the decision.

== Judgment ==
Crucially there was an exporter that had a live contract to export, and one that did not. The Court of Justice held that the exporter with the contract was individually concerned as it was part of a closed group, and annulled the decision where it was concerned. However, the exporter without a contract, despite being directly concerned (affected by the measure), was found not to be individually concerned.

Furthermore, article 130 imposed an obligation on the Commission to take the interests of such exporters into account, and the Commission had not done so. Regarding direct concern, because possibility that France would not decide to exercise authority was ‘entirely theoretical’, the discretion was not sufficient, in this case, to preclude direct concern.

== See also ==
- European Union law
