= Agricultural Unfair Trading Practices Directive 2019 =

EU Directive

The Agricultural Unfair Trading Practices Directive 2019 (2019/633) is an EU Directive designed to prevent misuse of supermarkets' bargaining power toward farmers in commercial dealings.

== Contents ==
The Directive prohibits abusive practices in agriculture. Article 3 prohibits a group of defined actions, including late payments by buyers to suppliers, cancellations at short notice, unilateral alteration of terms, threats of commercial retaliation and payments by suppliers to the buyers (i.e. from farmers to supermarkets) for stocking, adverts, marketing or staff.

These prohibitions are intended especially to limit supermarkets’ misuse of their "significant imbalances in bargaining power".

== See also ==
- EU law
- UK enterprise law
