= Dutch Competition Act =

Law in the Netherlands

The Dutch Competition Act (Mededingingswet) is the competition law in the Netherlands. It was passed on 22 May 1997 and entered into force on 1 January 1998. It was most recently amended on 25 June 2014.

The law contains provisions that prohibit anti-competitive agreements and abuses of dominant position, which largely reflect the European Union competition law (particularly Article 101 and Article 102 of the Treaty on the Functioning of the European Union). Any anti-competitive agreements are declared null and void. Exemptions may be granted if they advance technical or economic progress. An abuse of a dominant position is defined as one or more actions such as:

- imposing unfair prices or creating unfair trading conditions;
- limiting production or technical development;
- using different conditions for similar transactions with other parties.

The law also contains provisions that control mergers between firms. Mergers and takeovers must be notified to the Authority.

The law establishes the Netherlands Authority for Consumers and Markets (from 1998 to 2013, the Netherlands Competition Authority) as the national competition authority enforcing the law.

Administrative fines, penalty payments and binding instructions can be imposed by the Authority.
