= Commission v Anic Partecipazioni SpA =

EU competition law case

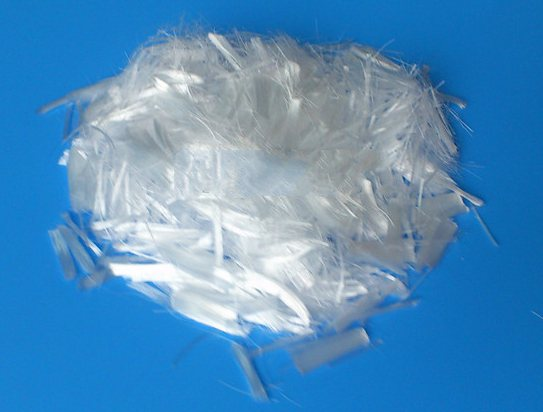
- Polypropelene fibre
- Court: European Court of Justice
- Citations: (1999) C-49/92, [1999] ECR I-4125

Keywords
- Competition, collusion

Commission v Anic Partecipazioni SpA (1999) C-49/92 is an EU competition law case, concerning the requirements for finding that there has been a cartel, or unlawful collusion, within TFEU article 101.

== Facts ==
Anic Partecipazioni SpA and several other corporations (including Montedison, Hoechst, Imperial Chemical Industries and Shell Chemicals) manufactured polypropylene, a substance used in packaging and labelling, some textiles, loudspeakers and polymer banknotes. Between 1977 and 1983 they had a system of target prices, and aimed to limit output to share the market according to quotas. Anic had a market share between 2.7 and 4.2 per cent.

The Commission found that Anic was in the cartel and fined it 750,000 ecu. The Court of First Instance reduced the Commission’s fine, saying the Commission failed to establish correctly how long Anic was involved in the cartel. Anic cross appealed, seeking further fine reduction or full annulment of the Commission’s Decision, arguing the Commission failed to specify whether its alleged infringement was an agreement or a concerted practice.

== Judgment ==
The Court of Justice upheld the General Court’s judgment. It was not necessary to distinguish agreements, decisions and concerted practices, as a long course of conduct could cover any of them. A concerted practice meant knowingly substituting competition with practical cooperation, and an agreement meant an expression of joint intention. But the two were not mutually incompatible.

5. According to the Commission's findings, which were confirmed on this point by the Court of First Instance, before 1977 the market for polypropylene was supplied by 10 producers, four of which (Montedison SpA (`Monte'), Hoechst AG, Imperial Chemical Industries plc (`ICI') and Shell International Chemical Company Ltd (`Shell') (`the big four')) together accounted for 64% of the market. Following the expiry of the controlling patents held by Monte, new producers appeared on the market in 1977, bringing about a substantial increase in real production capacity which was not, however, matched by a corresponding increase in demand. This led to rates of utilisation of production capacity of between 60% in 1977 and 90% in 1983. Each of the EEC producers operating at that time supplied the product in most, if not all, Member States.

[...]

108 The list in Article 85(1) of the Treaty is intended to apply to all collusion between undertakings, whatever the form it takes. There is continuity between the cases listed. The only essential thing is the distinction between independent conduct, which is allowed, and collusion, which is not, regardless of any distinction between types of collusion. Anic's argument would break down the unity and generality of the prohibited phenomenon and would remove from the ambit of the prohibition, without any reason, certain types of collusion which are no less dangerous than others. The Court of First Instance rightly rejected that argument at paragraph 199 of the judgment when it referred to the mental element without requiring an observable physical element.

109. The Court observes first of all that, at paragraphs 198 and 202 of the contested judgment, the Court of First Instance held that the Commission was entitled to categorise as agreements certain types of conduct on the part of the undertakings concerned, and, in the alternative, as concerted practices certain other forms of conduct on the part of the same undertakings. At paragraph 204, the Court of First Instance held that Anic had taken part in an integrated set of schemes constituting a single infringement which progressively manifested itself in both unlawful agreements and unlawful concerted practices.

[...]

112. Secondly, it must be observed that, if Article 85 of the Treaty distinguishes between `concerted practices', `agreements between undertakings' and `decisions by associations of undertakings', the aim is to have the prohibitions of that article catch different forms of coordination and collusion between undertakings (see, to that effect, in particular, ICI v Commission, cited above, paragraph 64).

113. It does not, however, follow that patterns of conduct having the same anti-competitive object, each of which, taken in isolation, would fall within the meaning of `agreement', `concerted practice' or `a decision by an association of undertakings', cannot constitute different manifestations of a single infringement of Article 85(1) of the Treaty.

114. The Court of First Instance was therefore entitled to consider that patterns of conduct by several undertakings were a manifestation of a single and complex infringement, corresponding partly to an agreement and partly to a concerted practice.

115. Thirdly, it must be borne in mind that a concerted practice, within the meaning of Article 85(1) of the Treaty, refers to a form of coordination between undertakings which, without having been taken to a stage where an agreement properly so called has been concluded, knowingly substitutes for the risks of competition practical cooperation between them (see Suiker Unie and Others v Commission, cited above, paragraph 26, and Joined Cases C-89/85, C-104/85, C-114/85, C-116/85, C-117/85 and C-125/85 to C-129/85 Ahlström Osakeyhtiö and Others v Commission [1993] ECR I-1307, paragraph 63).

116. The Court of Justice has further explained that criteria of coordination and cooperation must be understood in the light of the concept inherent in the provisions of the Treaty relating to competition, according to which each economic operator must determine independently the policy which he intends to adopt on the market (see Suiker Unie and Others v Commission, cited above, paragraph 173; Case 172/80 Züchner [1981] ECR 2021, paragraph 13; Ahlström Osakeyhtiö and Others v Commission, cited above, paragraph 63; and John Deere v Commission, cited above, paragraph 86).

117. According to that case-law, although that requirement of independence does not deprive economic operators of the right to adapt themselves intelligently to the existing and anticipated conduct of their competitors, it does however strictly preclude any direct or indirect contact between such operators, the object or effect whereof is either to influence the conduct on the market of an actual or potential competitor or to disclose to such a competitor the course of conduct which they themselves have decided to adopt or contemplate adopting on the market, where the object or effect of such contact is to create conditions of competition which do not correspond to the normal conditions of the market in question, regard being had to the nature of the products or services offered, the size and number of the undertakings and the volume of the said market (see, to that effect, Suiker Unie and Others v Commission, paragraph 174; Züchner, paragraph 14; and John Deere v Commission, paragraph 87, all cited above).

118. It follows that, as is clear from the very terms of Article 85(1) of the Treaty, a concerted practice implies, besides undertakings' concerting together, conduct on the market pursuant to those collusive practices, and a relationship of cause and effect between the two.

119. The Court of First Instance therefore committed an error of law in relation to the interpretation of the concept of concerted practice in holding that the undertakings' collusive practices had necessarily had an effect on the conduct of the undertakings which participated in them.

120. It does not, however, follow that the cross-appeal should be upheld. As the Court of Justice has repeatedly held (see, inter alia, Case C-30/91 P Lestelle v Commission [1992] ECR I-3755, paragraph 28), if the grounds of a judgment of the Court of First Instance reveal an infringement of Community law but the operative part appears well founded on other legal grounds, the appeal must be dismissed.

121. For one thing, subject to proof to the contrary, which it is for the economic operators concerned to adduce, there must be a presumption that the undertakings participating in concerting arrangements and remaining active on the market take account of the information exchanged with their competitors when determining their conduct on that market, particularly when they concert together on a regular basis over a long period, as was the case here, according to the findings of the Court of First Instance.

122. For another, a concerted practice, as defined above, falls under Article 85(1) of the Treaty even in the absence of anti-competitive effects on the market.

123. First, it follows from the actual text of Article 85(1) that, as in the case of agreements between undertakings and decisions by associations of undertakings, concerted practices are prohibited, regardless of their effect, when they have an anti-competitive object.

124. Next, although the concept of a concerted practice presupposes conduct of the participating undertakings on the market, it does not necessarily imply that that conduct should produce the concrete effect of restricting, preventing or distorting competition.

125. Lastly, that interpretation is not incompatible with the restrictive nature of the prohibition laid down in Article 85(1) of the Treaty (see Case 24/67 Parke Davis v Centrafarm [1968] ECR 55, p. 71) since, far from extending its scope, it corresponds to the literal meaning of the terms used in that provision.

126. The Court of First Instance therefore rightly held, despite faulty legal reasoning, that, since the Commission had established to the requisite legal standard that Anic had participated in collusion for the purpose of restricting competition, it did not have to adduce evidence that the collusion had manifested itself in conduct on the market. The question whether Anic has refuted the presumption set out in paragraph 121 of this judgment must therefore be examined.

[...]

130. Fourthly, it is clear from the settled case-law of the Court of Justice (see, in particular, ACF Chemiefarma v Commission, cited above, paragraph 112), which was quoted by the Court of First Instance at paragraph 198 of the contested judgment, that an agreement within the meaning of Article 85(1) of the Treaty arises from an expression, by the participating undertakings, of their joint intention to conduct themselves on the market in a specific way.

131. A comparison between that definition of agreement and the definition of a concerted practice dealt with in paragraphs 118 to 125 of this judgment shows that, from the subjective point of view, they are intended to catch forms of collusion having the same nature and are only distinguishable from each other by their intensity and the forms in which they manifest themselves.

132. It follows that, whilst the concepts of an agreement and of a concerted practice have partially different elements, they are not mutually incompatible. Contrary to Anic's allegations, the Court of First Instance did not therefore have to require the Commission to categorise either as an agreement or as a concerted practice each form of conduct found but was right to hold that the Commission had been entitled to characterise some of those forms of conduct as principally `agreements' and others as `concerted practices'.

133. Fifthly, it must be pointed out that this interpretation is not incompatible with the restrictive nature of the prohibition laid down in Article 85(1) of the Treaty (see Parke Davis v Centrafarm, cited above, p. 71). Far from creating a new form of infringement, the arrival at that interpretation merely entails acceptance of the fact that, in the case of an infringement involving different forms of conduct, these may meet different definitions whilst being caught by the same provision and being all equally prohibited.

134. Sixthly, it must be observed that, contrary to Anic's allegations, such an interpretation does not have an unacceptable effect on the question of proof and does not infringe the rights of defence of the undertakings concerned.

135. On the one hand, the Commission must still establish that each form of conduct found falls under the prohibition laid down in Article 85(1) of the Treaty as an agreement, a concerted practice or a decision by an association of undertakings.

136. On the other hand, the undertakings charged with having participated in the infringement have the opportunity of disputing, for each form of conduct, the characterisation or the characterisations applied by the Commission by contending that the Commission has not adduced proof of the constituent elements of the various forms of infringement alleged.

== See also ==
- EU competition law
