= Bundesverband der Arzneimittel-Importeure eV and Commission v Bayer =

European Court of Justice case regarding the EU's competition laws

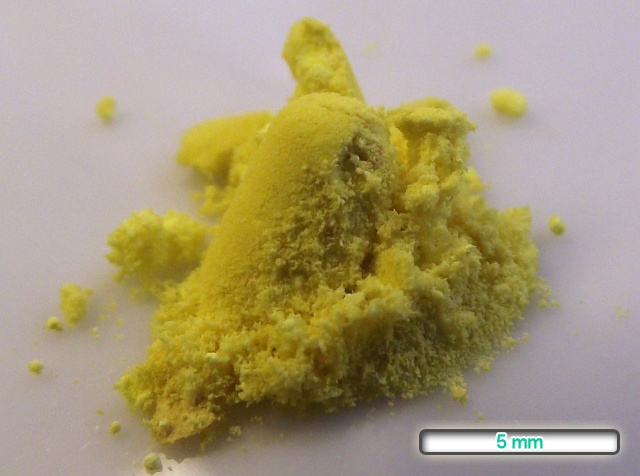
- Nifedipine, used in the Adalat brand
- Court: European Court of Justice
- Citations: (2004) C-2/01, [2004] 4 CMLR 13

Keywords
- Competition, collusion

Bundesverband der Arzneimittel-Importeure eV and Commission v Bayer (2004) C-2/01 is an EU competition law case, concerning the boundaries of unlawful collusion.

== Facts ==
Bayer AG, the parent of one of the largest European chemical and pharmaceutical groups, manufactured Adalat, used to treat cardio-vascular disease. It was sold by wholly owned subsidiaries in different member states. National health authorities fix prices for medicines, and the Spanish and French prices were fixed at a rate 40 per cent lower than UK prices. Wholesalers were buying Adalat in Spain and France and importing it to the UK, meaning that Bayer UK was at a loss. Bayer changed its delivery policy, so that it did not fulfil all large orders placed by Spain and France.

The Commission found that Bayer France and Bayer Spain had made an agreement with wholesalers, which amounted to an unlawful export ban. Bayer argued that it was restricting sales from Spain and France to the UK, but it denied that the policy was implemented through any agreement.

== Judgment ==
The ECJ held that Bayer had not acted unlawfully, because it had simply made a unilateral decision. To say that this was the same as an agreement would be to confuse (what is now) TFEU article 101 on collusion, with article 102 on abuse of monopoly power.

95. Concerning the alleged misinterpretation of the judgments in AEG and Ford, which was examined by the Court of First Instance, both Bayer and EFPIA argue that the situation in this case is different from that in those cases and they therefore deny that the Court of First Instance departed from that case-law.

Findings of the Court

96. It does not appear from the judgment under appeal that the Court of First Instance took the view that an agreement within the meaning of Article 85(1) of the Treaty could not exist unless one business partner demands a particular line of conduct from the other.

97. On the contrary, in paragraph 69 of the judgment under appeal, the Court of First Instance set out from the principle that the concept of an agreement within the meaning of Article 85(1) of the Treaty centres around the existence of a concurrence of wills between at least two parties, the form in which it is manifested being unimportant so long as it constitutes the faithful expression of the parties' intention. The Court further recalled, in paragraph 67 of the same judgment, that for there to be an agreement within the meaning of Article 85(1) of the Treaty it is sufficient that the undertakings in question should have expressed their common intention to conduct themselves on the market in a specific way.

98. Since, however, the question arising in this case is whether a measure adopted or imposed apparently unilaterally by a manufacturer in the context of the continuous relations which it maintains with its wholesalers constitutes an agreement within the meaning of Article 85(1) of the Treaty, the Court of First Instance examined the Commission's arguments, as set out in recital 155 of the contested decision, to the effect that Bayer infringed that article by imposing an export ban as part of the ... continuous commercial relations [of Bayer France and Bayer Spain] with their customers, and that the wholesalers' subsequent conduct reflected an implicit acquiescence in that ban (paragraph 74 of the judgment under appeal).

99. Concerning the argument that the Court of First Instance wrongly considered it necessary to prove an express export ban on the part of Bayer, it is clear from the Court's analysis concerning the system for monitoring the distribution of the consignments of Adalat delivered (see paragraphs 44 to 48 of this judgment) that it did not in any way require proof of an express ban.

100. Concerning the appellants' arguments that the Court of First Instance should have acknowledged that the manifestation of Bayer's intention to restrict parallel imports could constitute the basis of an agreement prohibited by Article 85(1) of the Treaty, it is true that the existence of an agreement within the meaning of that provision can be deduced from the conduct of the parties concerned.

101. However, such an agreement cannot be based on what is only the expression of a unilateral policy of one of the contracting parties, which can be put into effect without the assistance of others. To hold that an agreement prohibited by Article 85(1) of the Treaty may be established simply on the basis of the expression of a unilateral policy aimed at preventing parallel imports would have the effect of confusing the scope of that provision with that of Article 86 of the Treaty.

102. For an agreement within the meaning of Article 85(1) of the Treaty to be capable of being regarded as having been concluded by tacit acceptance, it is necessary that the manifestation of the wish of one of the contracting parties to achieve an anti-competitive goal constitute an invitation to the other party, whether express or implied, to fulfil that goal jointly, and that applies all the more where, as in this case, such an agreement is not at first sight in the interests of the other party, namely the wholesalers.

103. Therefore, the Court of First Instance was right to examine whether Bayer's conduct supported the conclusion that the latter had required of the wholesalers, as a condition of their future contractual relations, that they should comply with its new commercial policy.

== See also ==
- EU competition law
