= T-Mobile Netherlands BV v Raad van bestuur van de Nederlandse Mededingingsautoriteit =

T-Mobile Netherlands BV v 08 T-Mobile Netherlands BV v Raad van Bestuur van de Nederlandse Mededingingsautoriteit
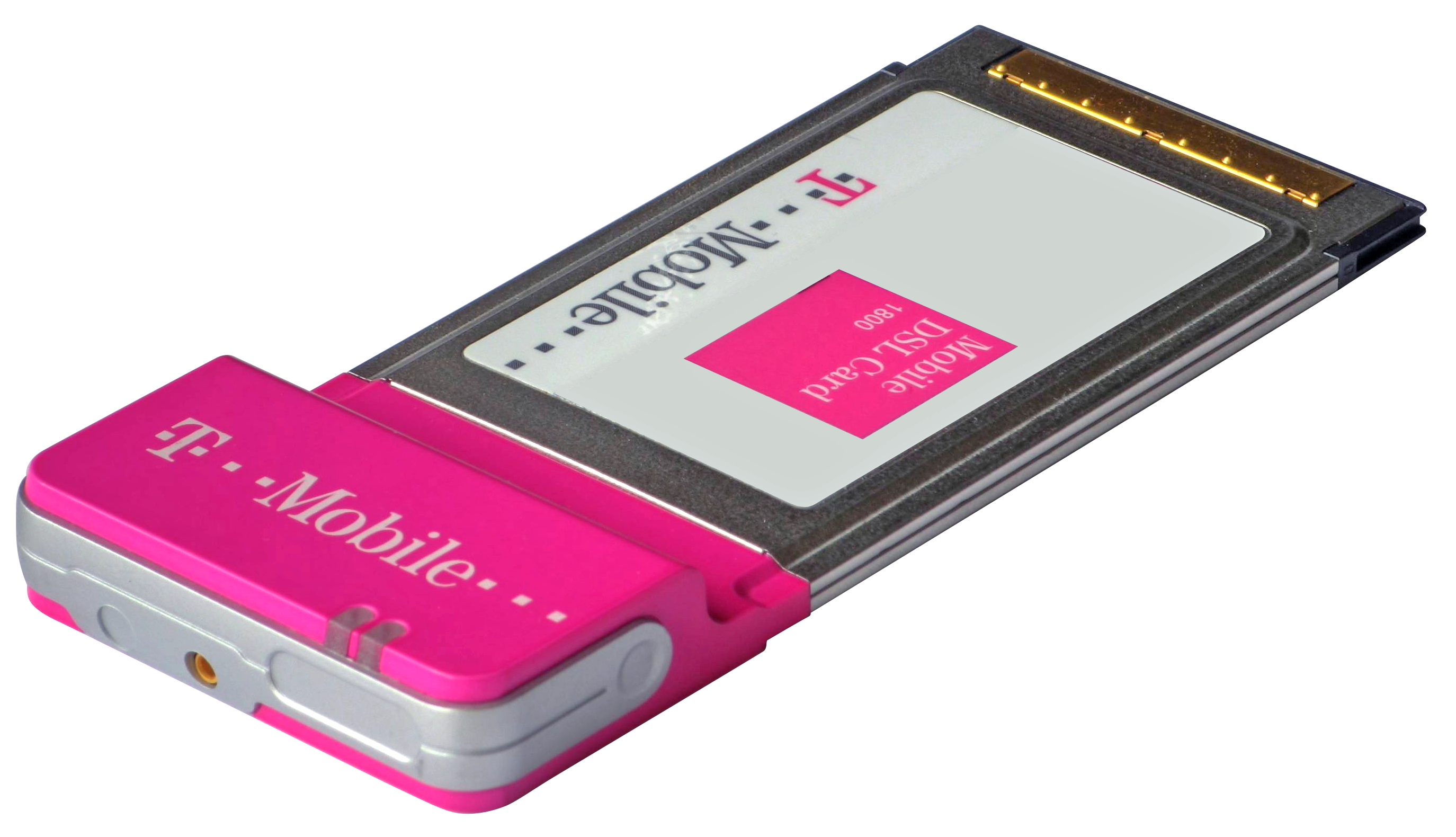
- Court: European Court of Justice
- Decided: 2009
- Citation: (2009) C-8/08

Keywords
- Competition, collusion

T-Mobile Netherlands BV v Raad van bestuur van de Nederlandse Mededingingsautoriteit (2009) C-8/08 is an EU competition law case, concerning the requirements for finding that firms have colluded with the "object" of harming competition.

== Facts ==
T-Mobile phone operators in the Netherlands met once, and discussed reducing the remuneration for dealers of certain phone contracts. It was argued, among other things, that there was no evidence of harm to the final consumer.

== Judgment ==
The Court of Justice held that the phone companies had engaged in an unlawful cartel, and there was no need to show harm to the final consumer.

27. With regard to the assessment as to whether a concerted practice is anti‑competitive, close regard must be paid in particular to the objectives which it is intended to attain and to its economic and legal context (see, to that effect, Joined Cases 96/82 to 102/82, 104/82, 105/82, 108/82 and 110/82 IAZ International Belgium and Others v Commission [1983] ECR 3369, paragraph 25, and Case C‑209/07 Beef Industry Development Society and Barry Brothers [2008] ECR I‑0000, paragraphs 16 and 21). Moreover, while the intention of the parties is not an essential factor in determining whether a concerted practice is restrictive, there is nothing to prevent the Commission of the European Communities or the competent Community judicature from taking it into account (see, to that effect, IAZ International Belgium and Others v Commission, paragraphs 23 to 25).

28. As regards the distinction to be drawn between concerted practices having an anti-competitive object and those with anti-competitive effects, it must be borne in mind that an anti-competitive object and anti-competitive effects constitute not cumulative but alternative conditions in determining whether a practice falls within the prohibition in Article 81(1) EC. It has, since the judgment in Case 56/65 LTM [1966] ECR 235, 249, been settled case-law that the alternative nature of that requirement, indicated by the conjunction ‘or’, means that it is necessary, first, to consider the precise purpose of the concerted practice, in the economic context in which it is to be pursued. Where, however, an analysis of the terms of the concerted practice does not reveal the effect on competition to be sufficiently deleterious, its consequences should then be considered and, for it to be caught by the prohibition, it is necessary to find that those factors are present which establish that competition has in fact been prevented or restricted or distorted to an appreciable extent (see, to that effect, Beef Industry Development Society and Barry Brothers, paragraph 15).

29. Moreover, in deciding whether a concerted practice is prohibited by Article 81(1) EC, there is no need to take account of its actual effects once it is apparent that its object is to prevent, restrict or distort competition within the common market (see, to that effect, Joined Cases 56/64 and 58/64 Consten and Grundig v Commission [1966] ECR 299, 342; Case C‑105/04 P Nederlandse Federatieve Vereniging voor de Groothandel op Elektrotechnisch Gebied v Commission [2006] ECR I‑8725, paragraph 125; and Beef Industry Development Society and Barry Brothers, paragraph 16). The distinction between ‘infringements by object’ and ‘infringements by effect’ arises from the fact that certain forms of collusion between undertakings can be regarded, by their very nature, as being injurious to the proper functioning of normal competition (Beef Industry Development Society and Barry Brothers, paragraph 17).

30. Accordingly, contrary to what the referring court claims, there is no need to consider the effects of a concerted practice where its anti‑competitive object is established.

31. With regard to the assessment as to whether a concerted practice, such as that at issue in the main proceedings, pursues an anti‑competitive object, it should be noted, first, as pointed out by the Advocate General at point 46 of her Opinion, that in order for a concerted practice to be regarded as having an anti‑competitive object, it is sufficient that it has the potential to have a negative impact on competition. In other words, the concerted practice must simply be capable in an individual case, having regard to the specific legal and economic context, of resulting in the prevention, restriction or distortion of competition within the common market. Whether and to what extent, in fact, such anti-competitive effects result can only be of relevance for determining the amount of any fine and assessing any claim for damages.

[...]

62. In the light of the foregoing, the answer to the third question must be that, in so far as the undertaking participating in the concerted action remains active on the market in question, there is a presumption of a causal connection between the concerted practice and the conduct of the undertaking on that market, even if the concerted action is the result of a meeting held by the participating undertakings on a single occasion.

== See also ==
- EU competition law
