= Deutsche Post v Commission =

- Court: European Court of Justice
- Citations: (2011) C-463/10P and C-475/10P

Keywords
- Judicial review

Deutsche Post v Commission is a 2011 pair of joined cases, C 463/10 P and C 475/10 P, before the Court of Justice of the European Union concerning the scope for judicial review in information injunctions in state aid cases. The opinion, handed down 13 October 2011, interprets Article 263 of the Treaty on the Functioning of the European Union to mean that any official act on the part of any body, office or agency of the European Union that produces binding legal effects affecting the interests of a natural or legal person is open to challenge before the Court of Justice. Overruling the General Court, the opinion thus strengthens the right to judicial review of administrative acts.

The pair of cases is part of a cluster of disputes sometimes referred to as the "Deutsche Post saga" in the academic community.

== Facts ==
Deutsche Post and Germany claimed annulment of an order by the General Court, which declared inadmissible their actions for annulment of a Commission decision to require Germany provide information on state aid to Deutsche Post. TFEU article 108 required member states to notify the Commission of plans to grant new aid, and to give all necessary information. In 2008 the Commission sent a questionnaire on DP's revenue and costs, and a reminder letter. Germany replied that it would be disproportionate in time and work to give the information after 1994. The Commission said the information had to be given in 20 days. Deutsche Post and Germany brought an action for annulment and the Commission argued it was not an 'act', and this was upheld by the General Court. It said that an injunction for information had no sanction, so was not an 'act' open to challenge.

== Judgment ==
The Third Chamber held that the Commission had done an act, and therefore an action for annulment could be brought. It produced independent legal effects.

36 According to consistent case-law, developed in the context of actions for annulment brought by Member States or institutions, any measures adopted by the institutions, whatever their form, which are intended to have binding legal effects are regarded as acts open to challenge, within the meaning of Article 263 TFEU .... The case-law further shows that a Member State, such as the applicant in Case C‑475/10 P, may admissibly bring an action for annulment of a measure producing binding legal effects without having to demonstrate that it has an interest in bringing proceedings....

37 Where the action for annulment against an act adopted by an institution is brought by a natural or legal person, the Court of Justice had repeatedly held that the action lies only if the binding legal effects of that act are capable of affecting the interests of the applicant by bringing about a distinct change in his legal position (see, in particular, IBM v Commission, paragraph 9; Athinaïki Techniki v Commission, paragraph 29; Case C‑322/09 P NDSHT v Commission [2010] ECR I-0000, paragraph 45).

38 It must, however, be emphasised that the case-law cited in the paragraph above was developed in the context of actions brought before the EU judicature by natural or legal persons against measures of which they were the addressees. Where, as in the case giving rise to the order in Deutsche Post v Commission, an action for annulment is brought by a non-privileged applicant against a measure that has not been addressed to it, the requirement that the binding legal effects of the measure being challenged must be capable of affecting the interests of the applicant by bringing about a distinct change in his legal position overlaps with the conditions laid down in the fourth paragraph of Article 263 TFEU.

[...]

45 It follows from the above that a decision taken pursuant to Article 10(3) of Regulation No 659/1999 is intended to produce binding legal effects within the meaning of the case-law cited in paragraph 36 of this judgment, and therefore constitutes an act open to challenge for the purposes of Article 263 TFEU.

[...]

53 Next, the case-law shows that an intermediate measure is also not capable of forming the subject-matter of an action if it is established that the illegality attaching to that measure can be relied on in support of an action against the final decision for which it represents a preparatory step. In such circumstances, the action brought against the decision terminating the procedure will provide sufficient judicial protection (IBM v Commission, paragraph 12; Case 53/85 AKZO Chemie and AKZO Chemie UK v Commission [1986] ECR 1965, paragraph 19; Case C-400/99 Italy v Commission [2001] ECR I 7303, paragraph 63).

54 However, if that latter condition is not satisfied, it will be considered that the intermediate measure – independently of whether the latter expresses a provisional opinion of the institution concerned – produces independent legal effects and must therefore be capable of forming the subject-matter of an action for annulment....

55 in this case, it must be held that an information under Article 10(3) of Regulation No 659/1999 produces independent legal effects.

[...]

71 As for whether Deutsche Post is individually concerned by the act at issue, it should be recalled that, according to consistent case-law of the Court of Justice, persons other than those to whom a decision is addressed may claim to be individually concerned only if that decision affects them by reason of certain attributes which are peculiar to them or by reason of circumstances in which they are differentiated from all other persons and, by virtue of those factors, distinguishes them individually just as in the case of the person addressed.

[...]

73 in that respect, it should be noted that the fact that the act at issue is not addressed to Deutsche Post is irrelevant for assessing whether that undertaking is individually concerned by that measure, for the purposes of the fourth paragraph of Article 263 TFEU.

74 Next, it must be noted that the information injunction refers to a procedure for examining a State aid measure from which Deutsche Post is alleged to have benefited. The information concerned by the act at issue concern only Deutsche Post. The latter is thus individually concerned by that measure for the purposes of the case-law cited in paragraph 71 of this judgment.

== See also ==
- European Union law
