= FNV Kunsten Informatie en Media v Staat der Nederlanden =

FNV Kunsten Informatie en Media v Netherlands
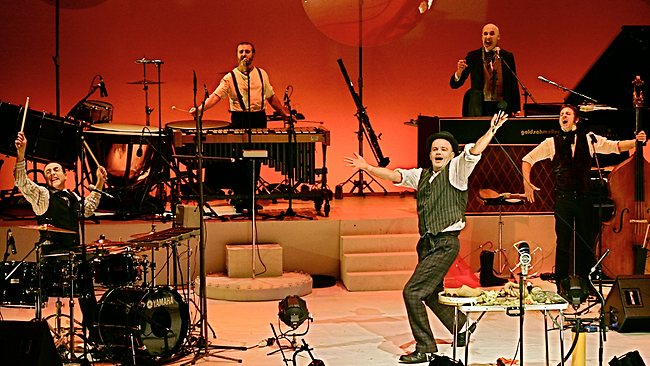
- Court: CJEU

Keywords
- Orchestra, collective agreement, competition law, false self-employment, sham

FNV Kunsten Informatie en Media v Staat der Nederlanden (2014) C-413/13 is a European labour law case, concerning European competition law.

== Facts ==
A Dutch trade union for orchestra substitute workers, the Arts, Information and Media Union (FNV Kunsten Informatie en Media, "FNV"), claimed that it was not subject to competition law as the Nederlandse Mededingingsautoriteit (Netherlands Competition Authority) had claimed was possible in a "reflection document". The orchestra workers were covered by a collective agreement that FNV had entered into.

== Judgment ==
The Court of Justice, First Chamber, held that agreements entered into by self-employed workers could be subject to article 101(1) as self-employed people could in principle be classified as undertakings, but not in any case where workers were "false self-employed" either in contract terms or for tax purposes.

24 In the case in the main proceedings, the agreement concerned was concluded between an employers’ organisation and employees’ organisations of mixed composition, which negotiated, in accordance with national law, not only for employed substitutes but also for affiliated self-employed substitutes.

25 Therefore, it is necessary to examine whether the nature and purpose of such an agreement enable it to be included in collective negotiations between employers and employees and justify its exclusion, as regards minimum fees for self-employed substitutes, from the scope of Article 101(1) TFEU.

26 First, as regards the nature of that agreement, it is clear from the findings of the referring court that the agreement was concluded in the form of a collective labour agreement. However, that agreement, specifically as regards the provision in Annex 5 thereto on minimum fees, is the result of negotiations between an employers’ organisation and employees’ organisations which also represent the interests of self-employed substitutes who provide services to orchestras under a works or service contract.

27 It must be held in that regard that, although they perform the same activities as employees, service providers such as the substitutes at issue in the main proceedings, are, in principle, ‘undertakings’ within the meaning of Article 101(1) TFEU, for they offer their services for remuneration on a given market (judgment in Ordem dos Técnicos Oficiais de Contas, C‑1/12, EU:C:2013:127, paragraphs 36 and 37) and perform their activities as independent economic operators in relation to their principal (see judgment in Confederación Española de Empresarios de Estaciones de Servicio, C‑217/05, EU:C:2006:784, paragraph 45).

28 It is clear, as also observed by the Advocate General in point 32 of his Opinion and the NMa in its reflection document, that, in so far as an organisation representing workers carries out negotiations acting in the name, and on behalf, of those self-employed persons who are its members, it does not act as a trade union association and therefore as a social partner, but, in reality, acts as an association of undertakings.

29 It should also be added that, although the Treaty encourages dialogue between management and labour, it does not, however, contain provisions, like Articles 153 TFEU and 155 TFEU or Articles 1 and 4 of the Agreement on social policy (OJ 1992 C 191, p. 91), encouraging self-employed service providers to open a dialogue with the employers to which they provide services under a works or service contract and, therefore, to conclude collective agreements with a view to improving their terms of employment and working conditions (see, by analogy, judgment in Pavlov and Others, EU:C:2000:428, paragraph 69).

30 In those circumstances, it follows that a provision of a collective labour agreement, such as that at issue in the main proceedings, in so far as it was concluded by an employees’ organisation in the name, and on behalf, of the self-employed services providers who are its members, does not constitute the result of a collective negotiation between employers and employees, and cannot be excluded, by reason of its nature, from the scope of Article 101(1) TFEU.

31 That finding cannot, however, prevent such a provision of a collective labour agreement from being regarded also as the result of dialogue between management and labour if the service providers, in the name and on behalf of whom the trade union negotiated, are in fact ‘false self-employed’, that is to say, service providers in a situation comparable to that of employees.

32 As observed by the Advocate General in point 51 of his Opinion, and by the FNV, the Netherlands Government and the European Commission at the hearing, in today’s economy it is not always easy to establish the status of some self-employed contractors as ‘undertakings’, such as the substitutes at issue in the main proceedings.

33 As far as concerns the case in the main proceedings, it must be recalled that, according to settled case-law, on the one hand, a service provider can lose his status of an independent trader, and hence of an undertaking, if he does not determine independently his own conduct on the market, but is entirely dependent on his principal, because he does not bear any of the financial or commercial risks arising out of the latter’s activity and operates as an auxiliary within the principal’s undertaking (see, to that effect, judgment in Confederación Española de Empresarios de Estaciones de Servicio, EU:C:2006:784, paragraphs 43 and 44).

34 On the other hand, the term ‘employee’ for the purpose of EU law must itself be defined according to objective criteria that characterise the employment relationship, taking into consideration the rights and responsibilities of the persons concerned. In that connection, it is settled case-law that the essential feature of that relationship is that for a certain period of time one person performs services for and under the direction of another person in return for which he receives remuneration (see judgments in N., C‑46/12, EU:C:2013:97, paragraph 40 and the case-law cited, and Haralambidis, C‑270/13, EU:C:2014:2185, paragraph 28).

35 From that point of view, the Court has previously held that the classification of a ‘self-employed person’ under national law does not prevent that person being classified as an employee within the meaning of EU law if his independence is merely notional, thereby disguising an employment relationship (see, to that effect, judgment in Allonby, C‑256/01, EU:C:2004:18, paragraph 71).

36 It follows that the status of ‘worker’ within the meaning of EU law is not affected by the fact that a person has been hired as a self-employed person under national law, for tax, administrative or organisational reasons, as long as that persons acts under the direction of his employer as regards, in particular, his freedom to choose the time, place and content of his work (see judgment in Allonby, EU:C:2004:18, paragraph 72), does not share in the employer’s commercial risks (judgment in Agegate, C‑3/87, EU:C:1989:650, paragraph 36), and, for the duration of that relationship, forms an integral part of that employer’s undertaking, so forming an economic unit with that undertaking (see judgment in Becu and Others, C‑22/98, EU:C:1999:419, paragraph 26).

37 In the light of those principles, in order that the self-employed substitutes concerned in the main proceedings may be classified, not as ‘workers’ within the meaning of EU law, but as genuine ‘undertakings’ within the meaning of that law, it is for the national court to ascertain that, apart from the legal nature of their works or service contract, those substitutes do not find themselves in the circumstances set out in paragraphs 33 to 36 above and, in particular, that their relationship with the orchestra concerned is not one of subordination during the contractual relationship, so that they enjoy more independence and flexibility than employees who perform the same activity, as regards the determination of the working hours, the place and manner of performing the tasks assigned, in other words, the rehearsals and concerts.

38 As regards, second, the purpose of the collective labour agreement at issue in the main proceedings, it must be held that the analysis in the light of the case-law referred to in paragraphs 22 and 23 above would be justified, on that point, only if the referring court were to classify the substitutes involved in the main proceedings not as ‘undertakings’ but as ‘false self-employed’.

39 That being said, it must be held that the minimum fees scheme put in place by the provision in Annex 5 to the collective labour agreement directly contributes to the improvement of the employment and working conditions of those substitutes, classified as ‘false self-employed’.

40 Such a scheme not only guarantees those service providers basic pay higher than they would have received were it not for that provision but also, as found by the referring court, enables contributions to be made to pension insurance corresponding to participation in the pension scheme for workers, thereby guaranteeing them the means necessary to be eligible in future for a certain level of pension.

41 Accordingly, a provision of a collective labour agreement, in so far as it sets minimum fees for service providers who are ‘false self-employed’, cannot, by reason of its nature and purpose, be subject to the scope of Article 101(1) TFEU.

42 In the light of those considerations, the answer to the questions referred is that, on a proper construction of EU law, it is only when self-employed service providers who are members of one of the contracting employees’ organisations and perform for an employer, under a works or service contract, the same activity as that employer’s employed workers, are ‘false self-employed’, in other words, service providers in a situation comparable to that of those workers, that a provision of a collective labour agreement, such as that at issue in the main proceedings, which sets minimum fees for those self-employed service providers, does not fall within the scope of Article 101(1) TFEU. It is for the national court to ascertain whether that is so.

== See also ==
- United Kingdom labour law
- European competition law
