= British Airways plc v Commission =

EU competition law case

- Court: Court of Justice of the EU
- Citation: [2007] ECR I-2331, C-95/04

British Airways plc v Commission (2007) C-95/04 is a leading EU competition law case, concerning monopoly and abuse of a dominant position.

== Facts ==
British Airways offered travel agents extra commissions if they promoted BA tickets. The Commission said that this was discriminatory, designed to induce loyalty and served to exclude competing airlines.

== Judgment ==
The Court of Justice of the EU held that BA had abused its dominant position because bonuses were individual for each travel agent, based on tickets sold and not those sold over a given level. So selling extra BA tickets meant a large increase in bonus payments. It was worth selling more BA tickets than other airline tickets. The key part of the judgment was as follows:

68. [It is necessary to show the effect of...] making market entry very difficult or impossible for competitors of the undertaking in a dominant position and, secondly, of making it more difficult or impossible for its co-contractors to choose between various sources of supply or commercial partners.

69. ... an undertaking is at liberty to demonstrate that its bonus system producing an exclusionary effect is economically justified.

71. Exclusion can come from ‘goal-related discounts or bonuses, that is to say those the granting of which is linked to the attainment of sales objectives defined individually…

73. [Induced loyalty can be very strong if] a discount or bonus does not relate solely to the growth in turnover in relation to purchases or sales of products of that undertaking made by those co-contractors during the period under consideration, but extends also to the whole of the turnover relating to those purchases or sales. In that way, relatively modest variations – whether upwards or downwards – in the turnover figures relating to the products of the dominant undertaking have disproportionate effects on co-contractors…

...

75. By reason of its significantly higher market share, the undertaking in a dominant position generally constitutes an unavoidable business partner in the market.

86. If the exclusionary effect of that system bears no relation to advantages for the market and consumers, or if it goes beyond what is necessary in order to attain those advantages, that system must be regarded as an abuse.

...

105. It should be noted first that, as explained in paragraphs 57 and 58 of this judgment, discounts or bonuses granted by an undertaking in a dominant position may be contrary to Article 82 EC even where they do not correspond to any of the examples mentioned in the second paragraph of that article.

106. Moreover, as the Court has already held in paragraph 26 of its judgment in Europemballage and Continental Can, Article 82 EC is aimed not only at practices which may cause prejudice to consumers directly, but also at those which are detrimental to them through their impact on an effective competition structure, such as is mentioned in Article 3(1)(g) EC.

== See also ==
- EU law
- EU competition law
