= Opta =

Opta or OPTA may refer to:

- Opta Sports, a sports data company
- Onafhankelijke Post en Telecommunicatie Autoriteit, a former Dutch government agency
- SunOpta, a Canadian food and mineral company
- Tarbela Dam Airport (ICAO code OPTA), an airport in Pakistan
