= CEEAG =

European Union state aid guidelines

European Commission
- Long title: Climate, Energy and Environmental Aid Guidelines
- Territorial extent: EEA (EU member states, Iceland, Liechtenstein, and Norway)
- Enacted by: European Commission
- Enacted: 21 December 2021
- Effective: EU: 27 January 2022 (Iceland, Liechtenstein, and Norway: 9 February 2022)

Amends
- EEAG
- Status: In force

The Climate, Energy and Environmental Aid Guidelines (CEEAG) allow exceptions to the ban on state aid in the European Union (EU). State aid means subsidies or other benefits EU countries or the EU itself grant to companies.

The CEEAG allow state aid to renewable energy, clean mobility, and hydrogen companies, among others. Fossil fuel production cannot receive state aid under the guidelines, except for gas under some circumstances.

Most EU state aid is provided under block exemption, but it can also be provided under state aid exemption guidelines like the CEEAG. To provide state aid under such a guideline, EU member states require the consent of the European Commission, unless the aid falls under a minimum threshold ('de minimis').

The three other members of the European Economic Area (Iceland, Liechtenstein, Norway) request the exemption from the EFTA Surveillance Authority.

To obtain European Commission approval for aid under the CEEAG, EU member states use a special software. The Commission publishes its decisions on its competition website.

== History ==
The CEEAG replace the Energy and Environmental Aid Guidelines (EEAG, without 'climate') which were in force from 2014 to 2021. The revision process included a public consultation.

== Examples of state aid under EEAG/CEEAG ==
An example of state aid falling under (C)EEAG is the German Renewable Energy Sources Act (EEG in its German abbreviation), a scheme that subsidises renewable power. The German government revised the EEG at the beginning of 2021. The Commission rejected parts of the revision in April 2021, including subsidies to nuclear power plants, but approved other aspects of it using EEAG. Notably, it approved higher subsidies for solar power and onshore wind farms. As of 15 December 2021, the Commission still is to consider the approval of other aspects of the German scheme's revision.
