= French Endives =

Decision of the European Court of Justice

- European Court of Justice

Decided 14 November 2017
- Full case name: Président de l’Autorité de la concurrence v Association des producteurs vendeurs d’endives (APVE) and Others
- Case: C‑671/15
- ECLI: EU:C:2017:860
- Language of proceedings: French

Court composition
- President; Koen Lenaerts
- Judge Rapporteur; Daniel Šváby

Legislation affecting
- Art. 101 TFEU

Président de l’Autorité de la concurrence v APVE and Others, popularly known as French Endives after its subject matter, is a 2017 EU law decision of the European Court of Justice. It determined that farmers are, to some degree, exempt from the EU's regular competition rules. Cooperation between farmers in a producer organisation or association of producer associations does not count as a cartel under Art. 101(1) TFEU.
