= Municipality of Differdange v Commission =

- Court: European Court of Justice
- Citation: (1984) Case 222/83

Keywords
- Judicial review

Municipality of Differdange v Commission (1984) Case 222/83 is an EU law case, concerning judicial review in the European Union.

== Facts ==
The European Commission allowed Luxembourg to grant state aid to steel firms if they reduced capacity. The municipality sought to challenge this decision, and claimed it was directly and individually concerned because reducing capacity and closing factories would mean a reduction of its tax collections.

== Judgment ==
The Court of Justice held the establishments were not identified and there is a margin of discretion for member states. Therefore, the municipality was not directly concerned.

== See also ==
- European Union law
