= Commercial Solvents Corporation v Commission =

- Court: Court of Justice of the EU
- Citations: (1974) Cases 6/73 and 7/73 [1974] ECR 223

Keywords
- Abuse, dominance, refusal to supply

Commercial Solvents Corporation v Commission (1974) Cases 6/73 and 7/73 is an EU competition law case, concerning monopoly and abuse of a dominant position.

== Facts ==
Commercial Solvents Corp (also Istituto Chemioterapico Italiano SpA was being sued) ceased selling aminobutanol to Zoja, which was used to make an anti-tuberculosis drug. CSC decided to start making the drug itself, and so stopped selling to Zoja.

== Judgment ==
The ECJ held that CSC was dominant and abused its position.

25. ... an undertaking which has a dominant position in the market in raw materials and which, with the object of reserving such raw material for manufacturing its own derivatives, refuses to supply a customer, which is itself a manufacturer of these derivatives, and therefore risks eliminating all competition on the part of this customer, is abusing its dominant position.

== See also ==
- EU law
- EU competition law
