= International Business Machines Corporation v Commission =

IBM Corp. v Commission
- Court: European Court of Justice
- Full case name: International Business Machines Corporation v Commission of the European Communities
- Citation: (1981) Case 60/81

Keywords
- Judicial review

International Business Machines Corporation v Commission (1981) Case 60/81 is an EU law case, concerning judicial review in the European Union.

== Facts ==
The Commission initiated an investigation into IBM for engaging in anti-competitive practices such as offering bundles of hardware and software and refusing to provide software to customers unless hardware produced by IBM was used with it.

The Commission sent a letter to IBM informing it about the imminent proceedings for abusing its dominant position, under EU competition law, inviting it to put a case. IBM sought to challenge the letter in judicial review proceedings, and the question was whether the letter was a reviewable act.

== Judgment ==
The Court of Justice held this letter was not a reviewable act, just a preliminary decision, and that IBM could only legally challenge the investigation after the Commission made its final decision. IBM was also ordered to cover the legal costs of the case.

== See also ==
- European Union law
