= United Brands Company v Commission of the European Communities =

1976 case in the European Court of Justice

United Brands v Commission
- European Court of Justice

Submitted 15 March 1976 Decided 14 February 1978
- Full case name: United Brands Company and United Brands Continentaal BV v Commission of the European Communities
- Case: 27/76
- CelexID: 61976J0027
- ECLI: ECLI:EU:C:1978:22
- Nationality of parties: Netherlands

Court composition
- President; H. Kutscher
- Judges: M. Sørensen; G. Bosco; A. M. Donner; J. Mertens de Wilmars; Lord Mackenzie Stuart; A. Touffait
- Advocate General; H. Mayras

Instruments cited
- EEC Treaty

Keywords
- Competition; Abuse of a Dominant Position

United Brands v Commission (1976) Case 27/76 is an EU competition legal case concerning abuse of a dominant position in a relevant product market. The case involved the infamous "green banana clause". It is one of the most famous cases in European competition law, which seeks to curb cartels, collusion and other anti-competitive practices, and to curb abuse of dominant market positions.

== Facts ==
United Brands Company (UBC) was the main supplier of bananas in Europe, using mainly the Chiquita brand. UBC forbade its distributors/ripeners to sell bananas that UBC did not supply. Also, UBC fixed pricing each week; charging a higher price in different Member States, and imposed unfair prices upon customers in Belgo-Luxembourg Economic Union, Denmark, The Netherlands and Germany.

The Commission viewed United Brands' action as a breach of Article 86 of the Treaty of Rome (now Art 102 of the TFEU). Article 86 prohibits "abuse of a dominant position" of a relevant market. The case was referred for a Preliminary Ruling to the European Court of Justice under Article 177 (now Art 267).

== Judgement ==
Agreeing with the Commission, the ECJ held that United Brands' behaviour was unlawful:

- The ECJ rejected UBC's claim that the product market was the "fresh-fruit market as a whole". Instead, because of the notion of cross elasticity of demand and product characteristics, the product market was defined as the banana market. It was assessed that bananas had an inelastic demand, and that the product was not interchangeable with others in the "fresh-fruit market".
- UBC had about 45% of the EU banana market, and 45% was deemed to amount to a "dominant position".
- Since the "green banana clause" effectively prevented any competing logistics firms from carrying Chiquita bananas, it was anti-competitive and in breach of Art 86.
- Furthermore, UBC's policy of applying differing prices to transactions with different trading partners was held to be anti-competitive.

== See also ==
- EU competition law
- Consten & Grundig v Commission
