= Courage Ltd v Crehan =

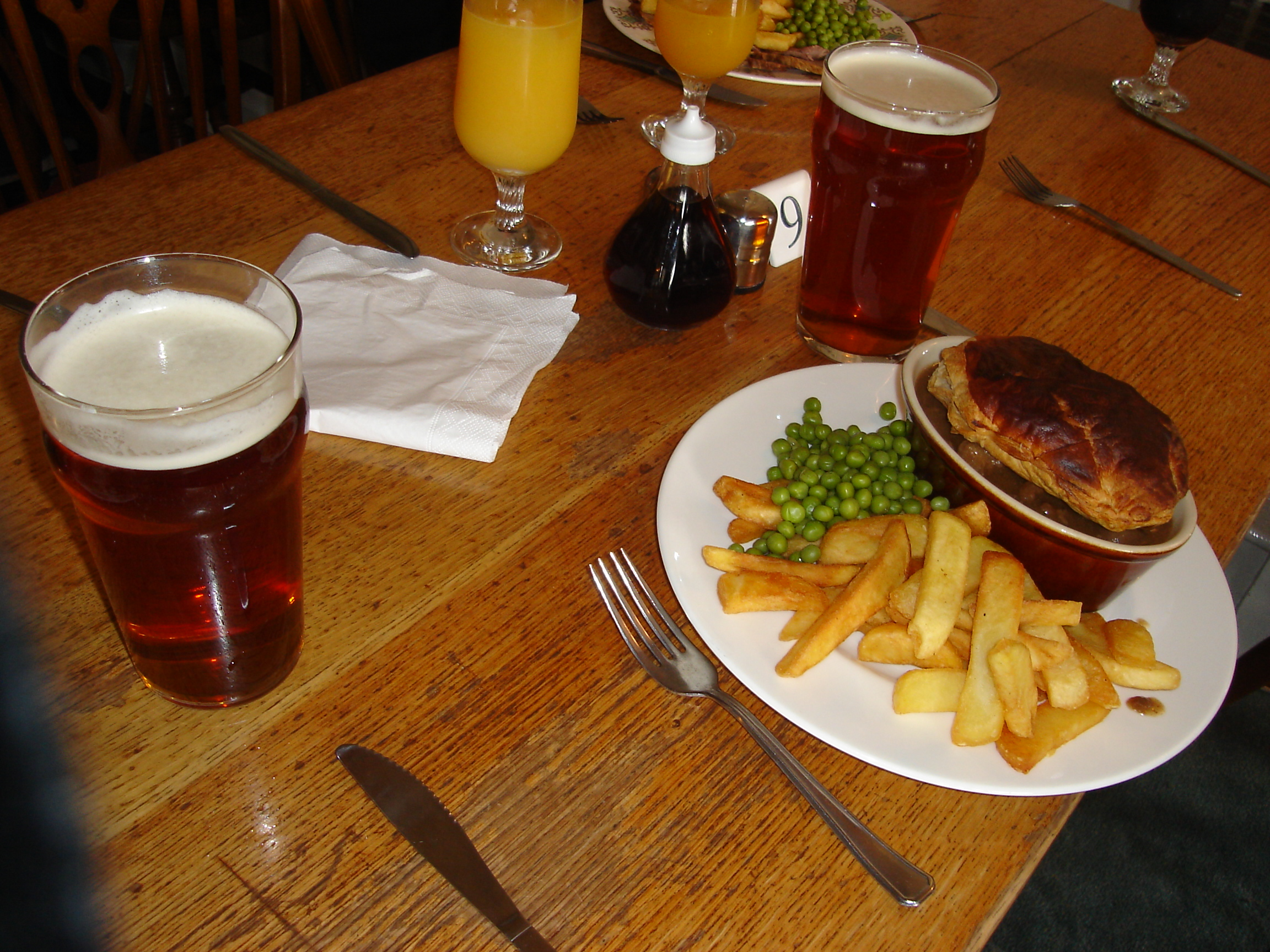
- Court: European Court of Justice
- Citation: (2001) Case C-453/99, [2001] ECR I-6297; [2006] UKHL 38

Keywords
- Contract, competition law, vertical restraint, beer tie

Courage Ltd v Crehan and Inntrepreneur Pub Company v Crehan (2001) C-453/99 are a series of EU competition law and English contract law cases, concerning the validity of beer tie agreements. After a lengthy course of litigation, the UK House of Lords held that a High Court judge was not wrong to find that competition had not been foreclosed for a pub landlord, Mr Crehan. This finding was, however, on narrow grounds, and ran contrary to the decision of the English Court of Appeal, and appeared different to the European Commission and European Court of Justice. In the Small Business, Enterprise and Employment Act 2015, sections 41 to 73, the beer ties were abolished altogether.

== Facts ==
In 1991, Crehan agreed with Inntrepreneur, which controlled 7,355 pubs, to take two leases on pubs in Staines, where he would have to buy the beer from Courage Ltd, which owned 19% of UK beer sales. He had to buy beer exclusively at a specified price. The lease was a standard form, and it was not negotiable. In 1991, Courage and Grand Metropolitan had set up Inntrepreneur as a jointly owned company. The leases were all extended to 20 years, much longer than previously. However, the Secretary of State, in charge of competition law enforcement at the time, required that holdings be reduced to 4,350 by October 1992, and that ties be released by March 1998. However Crehan could not compete for anywhere near that long against free houses nearby who could buy beer more cheaply, and in September 1993 his business failed, with a loss. He was sued for £15,226 for outstanding sums for beer. Courage Ltd claimed that Crehan had not paid for deliveries of beer. Crehan argued that the agreement was contrary to TEC article 81, and unenforceable, and counterclaimed for damages. It was shown that free houses were able to buy beer at much lower prices than tied tenants, reducing their profitability.

Inntrepreneur had sought negative clearance from the Commission in 1992 that it could not infringe competition law under TEC article 81(3). In 1994, Crehan and others applied for a declaration that there was an infringement. In 1997, after a different agreement was negotiated, Inntrepeneur withdrew its application, and the Commission stated (given the withdrawal) now that only the national court could decide.

== Judgment ==
=== Court of Appeal ===
The Court of Appeal held that English law did not permit a party to an illegal agreement to recover damages, and so an action in damages would in any case be barred for Mr Crehan even if an article 81 action were successful.

=== European Court of Justice ===
The ECJ held that article 81(2) made agreements void, Mr Crehan could obtain relief, and in principle claim damages. A rule of national law that barred such a claim was precluded. It was true, as a principle of EU law, that a litigant should not profit from unlawful conduct, but this did not apply if the party did not bear significant responsibility for the distortion of competition, paras 22–28. At 32 it said to determine responsibility, the bargaining power of the parties and their conduct should be taken into account. At 34 it said a network of contracts could have a cumulative effect on competition, and the party who contracts with the one controlling a network cannot bear significant responsibility.

24 It follows from the foregoing considerations that any individual can rely on a breach of Article 85(1) of the Treaty before a national court even where he is a party to a contract that is liable to restrict or distort competition within the meaning of that provision.

[...]

32 In that regard, the matters to be taken into account by the competent national court include the economic and legal context in which the parties find themselves and, as the United Kingdom Government rightly points out, the respective bargaining power and conduct of the two parties to the contract.

33 In particular, it is for the national court to ascertain whether the party who claims to have suffered loss through concluding a contract that is liable to restrict or distort competition found himself in a markedly weaker position than the other party, such as seriously to compromise or even eliminate his freedom to negotiate the terms of the contract and his capacity to avoid the loss or reduce its extent, in particular by availing himself in good time of all the legal remedies available to him.

34 Referring to the judgments in Case 23/67 Brasserie de Haecht [1967] ECR 127 and Case C-234/89 Delimitis [1991] ECR I-935, paragraphs 14 to 26, the Commission and the United Kingdom Government also rightly point out that a contract might prove to be contrary to Article 85(1) of the Treaty for the sole reason that it is part of a network of similar contracts which have a cumulative effect on competition. In such a case, the party contracting with the person controlling the network cannot bear significant responsibility for the breach of Article 85, particularly where in practice the terms of the contract were imposed on him by the party controlling the network.

35 Contrary to the submission of Courage, making a distinction as to the extent of the parties' liability does not conflict with the case-law of the Court to the effect that it does not matter, for the purposes of the application of Article 85 of the Treaty, whether the parties to an agreement are on an equal footing as regards their economic position and function (see inter alia Joined Cases 56/64 and 58/64 Consten and Grundig v Commission [1966] ECR 382). That case-law concerns the conditions for application of Article 85 of the Treaty while the questions put before the Court in the present case concern certain consequences in civil law of a breach of that provision.

=== High Court ===
Park J held that he was not bound by findings of fact by the Commission in 1999 that it was difficult to gain access to the UK beer market. The market had not been foreclosed, and so Crehan's claim was dismissed.

=== Court of Appeal ===
The Court of Appeal held that this probably conflicted with the commission's views, and so the High Court's decision was precluded. Damages were awarded.

=== House of Lords ===
The House of Lords held that the first instance judge's decision was to be restored. Conflicts between the commission's decisions and courts should be avoided, but the decisions were different enough that the Court of Appeal should not have interfered.

== See also ==
- English contract law
