= Arts, Information and Media Union =

Dutch trade union

The Arts, Information and Media Union (Dutch: Kunsten, Informatie en Media, KIEM) was a trade union representing workers in various sectors in the Netherlands.

== History ==
The union was founded in 1998, when the Printing and Paper Union merged with the Arts Union. Like both its predecessors, it affiliated to the Dutch Federation of Trade Unions (FNV). By 1998, the union had 48,135 members.

On 11 June 2016, the union split, with artists forming a new Arts Union, while other members became direct members of the FNV, forming a new Media and Culture sector.

== Presidents ==
1998: Rene van Tilborg
2003: Lucia Van Westerlaak
2007:
2013: Geert van der Tang

== See also ==
- FNV Kunsten Informatie en Media v Staat der Nederlanden
