= Wouters v Algemene Raad van de Nederlandse Orde van Advocaten =

Wouters v Nederlandse Orde van Advocaten
- Court: European Court of Justice
- Full case name: Wouters v Algemene Raad van de Nederlandse Orde van Advocaten
- Citation: (2002) C-309/99

Keywords
- Competition, regulation

Wouters v Algemene Raad van de Nederlandse Orde van Advocaten (2002) C-309/99 is decision of the European Court of Justice concerning competition law and the freedom of establishment. In both of these areas, the ECJ held that restrictions could be justified on the grounds of legitimate public policy, in this case ensuring the impartiality of the legal profession, if the measures taken were both necessary and proportionate (and in the case of restrictions on competition, purely ancillary) to that objective.

== Facts ==
The Dutch bar prevented lawyers from entering a partnership with non-lawyers, including accountants. It was argued that these rules could limit production and technical development contrary to article 81(1)(b).

== Judgment ==
The European Court of Justice held that rules would fall outside article 81(1) if they could ‘reasonably be considered to be necessary in order to ensure the proper practice of the legal profession as it is organised.’ Non-competition objectives are there ‘in order to ensure that the ultimate consumers of legal services and the sound administration of justice are provided with the necessary guarantees in relation to integrity and experience...’

== See also ==
- EU competition law
