= O2 (Germany) GmbH & Co OHG v Commission =

EU competition law case

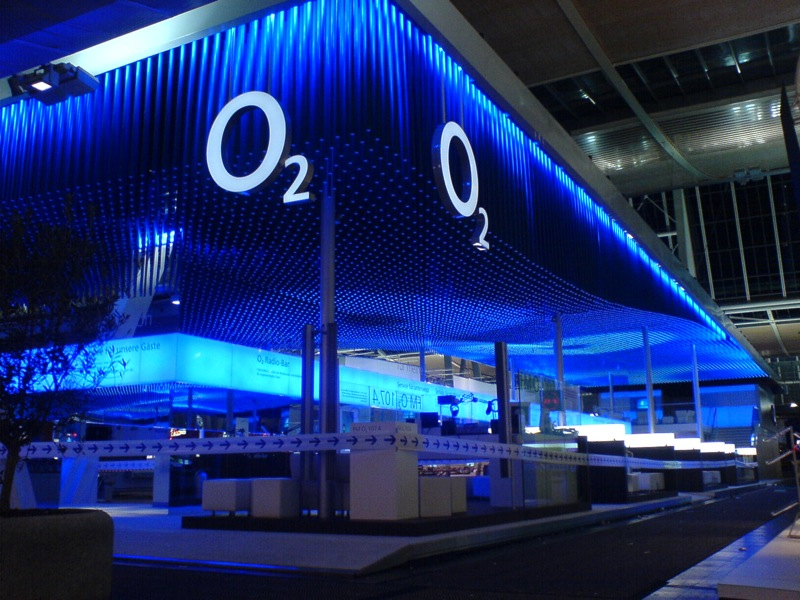
- O2 store in Hannover
- Court: European Court of Justice
- Citations: (2006) T-328/03, [2006] ECR II-1231

Keywords
- Competition, collusion

O2 (Germany) GmbH & Co OHG v Commission (2006) T-328/03 is an EU competition law case, concerning the requirements for a restriction of competition to be found under TFEU article 101.

== Facts ==
O2 (which is the trading name for Telefónica Europe plc) and T-Mobile made a ‘roaming’ agreement, designed to give O2 a foothold in the German market while it was building its own network.

The Commission found that the agreement restricted competition at the wholesale and retail level, but under article 101(3) found that the agreement would overall improve competition in the relevant markets, and gave an exemption. This was for a shorter period than the parties wanted, and they sought annulment of the Commission’s Decision.

== Judgment ==
The General Court held that the Commission had failed to examine the anti-competitive effects of the agreement, as it was acknowledged that the agreement did not have an anti-competitive object.

66. In order to assess whether an agreement is compatible with the common market in the light of the prohibition laid down in Article 81(1) EC, it is necessary to examine the economic and legal context in which the agreement was concluded (Case 22/71 Béguelin Import [1971] ECR 949, paragraph 13), its object, its effects, and whether it affects intra-Community trade taking into account in particular the economic context in which the undertakings operate, the products or services covered by the agreement, and the structure of the market concerned and the actual conditions in which it functions (Case C‑399/93 Oude Littikhuis and Others [1995] ECR I‑4515, paragraph 10).

67. That method of analysis is of general application and is not confined to a category of agreements (see, as regards different types of agreements, Case 56/65 Société minière et technique [1966] ECR 235, at 249-250; Case C‑250/92 DLG [1994] ECR I‑5641, paragraph 31; Case T‑35/92 John Deere v Commission [1994] ECR II‑957, paragraphs 51 and 52; and Joined Cases T‑374/94, T‑375/94, T‑384/94 and T‑388/94 European Night Services and Others v Commission [1998] ECR II‑3141, paragraphs 136 and 137).

68. Moreover, in a case such as this, where it is accepted that the agreement does not have as its object a restriction of competition, the effects of the agreement should be considered and for it to be caught by the prohibition it is necessary to find that those factors are present which show that competition has in fact been prevented or restricted or distorted to an appreciable extent. The competition in question must be understood within the actual context in which it would occur in the absence of the agreement in dispute; the interference with competition may in particular be doubted if the agreement seems really necessary for the penetration of a new area by an undertaking (Société minière et technique at 249-250).

69. Such a method of analysis, as regards in particular the taking into account of the competition situation that would exist in the absence of the agreement, does not amount to carrying out an assessment of the pro- and anti-competitive effects of the agreement and thus to applying a rule of reason, which the Community judicature has not deemed to have its place under Article 81(1) EC (Case C‑235/92 P Montecatini v Commission [1999] ECR I‑4539, paragraph 133; M6 and Others v Commission, paragraphs 72 to 77; and Case T‑65/98 Van den Bergh Foods v Commission [2002] ECR II‑4653, paragraphs 106 and 107).

70. In this respect, to submit, as the applicant does, that the Commission failed to carry out a full analysis by not examining what the competitive situation would have been in the absence of the agreement does not mean that an assessment of the positive and negative effects of the agreement from the point of view of competition must be carried out at the stage of Article 81(1) EC. Contrary to the defendant’s interpretation of the applicant’s arguments, the applicant relies only on the method of analysis required by settled case-law.

71. The examination required in the light of Article 81(1) EC consists essentially in taking account of the impact of the agreement on existing and potential competition (see, to that effect, Case C‑234/89 Delimitis [1991] ECR I‑935, paragraph 21) and the competition situation in the absence of the agreement (Société minière et technique at 249-250), those two factors being intrinsically linked.

72. The examination of competition in the absence of an agreement appears to be particularly necessary as regards markets undergoing liberalisation or emerging markets, as in the case of the 3G mobile communications market here at issue, where effective competition may be problematic owing, for example, to the presence of a dominant operator, the concentrated nature of the market structure or the existence of significant barriers to entry – factors referred to, in the present case, in the Decision.

[...]

77. Working on the assumption that O2 was present on the mobile communications market, the Commission did not therefore deem it necessary to consider in more detail whether, in the absence of the agreement, O2 would have been present on the 3G market. It must be held that that assumption is not supported in the Decision by any analysis or justification showing that it is correct, a finding that, moreover, the defendant could only confirm at the hearing. Given that there was no such objective examination of the competition situation in the absence of the agreement, the Commission could not have properly assessed the extent to which the agreement was necessary for O2 to penetrate the 3G mobile communications market. The Commission therefore failed to fulfil its obligation to carry out an objective analysis of the impact of the agreement on the competitive situation.

78. That lacuna cannot be deemed to be without consequences. It is apparent from the considerations set out in the Decision in the analysis of the agreement in the light of the conditions laid down in Article 81(3) EC as regards whether it was possible to grant an exemption that, even in the Commission’s view, it was unlikely that O2 would have been able, individually, without the agreement, to ensure from the outset better coverage, quality and transmission rates for 3G services, to roll out a network and launch 3G services rapidly, to penetrate the relevant wholesale and retail markets and therefore be an effective competitor (recitals 122 to 124, 126 and 135). It was because of those factors that the Commission considered that the agreement was eligible for exemption.

79. Such considerations, which imply some uncertainty concerning the competitive situation and, in particular, as regards O2’s position in the absence of the agreement, show that the presence of O2 on the 3G communications market could not be taken for granted, as the Commission had assumed, and that an examination in this respect was necessary not only for the purposes of granting an exemption but, prior to that, for the purposes of the economic analysis of the effects of the agreement on the competitive situation determining the applicability of Article 81 EC.

== See also ==
- EU competition law
