= Netherlands Competition Authority =

- Nederlandse Mededingingsautoriteit
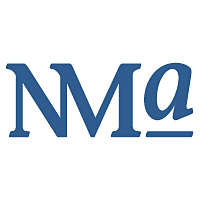

Agency overview
- Jurisdiction: Netherlands government
- Agency executive: Chairman of Committee

The Netherlands Competition Authority (Dutch: Nederlandse Mededingingsautoriteit; NMa) was the competition regulator for the Netherlands. After a merger with the Consumentenautoriteit and Onafhankelijke Post en Telecommunicatie Autoriteit on 1 April 2013, it became the Netherlands Authority for Consumers and Markets (Autoriteit Consument en Markt). The Netherlands Competition Authority monitored all Dutch markets, to ensure fair competition.

The "Dutch office of Energy Regulation" (Energiekamer) was part of the Netherlands Competition Authority and committed to making energy markets work as effectively as possible.

== Tasks ==
The main goal for the Netherlands Competition Authority was to ensure fair competition between Dutch companies. In order to do so, it focused on 3 main tasks:

- To fight cartel-deals
- To prevent the abuse of economic strength, for example in virtual monopoly or oligopoly situations
- To check on the concentrations and spread of companies

== See also ==
- Cartel
