= State aid (European Union) =

Form of government subsidy restricted in EU law

State aid in the European Union is the name given to a subsidy or any other aid provided by a government that distorts competition. Under European Union competition law, the term has a legal meaning, being any measure that demonstrates any of the characteristics in Article 107 of the Treaty on the Functioning of the European Union, in that if it distorts competition or the free market, it is classified by the European Union as illegal state aid. Measures that fall within the definition of state aid are considered unlawful unless provided under an exemption or notified by the European Commission. In 2019, the EU member states provided state aid corresponding to 0.81% of the bloc's GDP.

== EU policy on state aid ==
The Treaty on the Functioning of the European Union (Art. 107, para. 1) reads:

"Save as otherwise provided in this Treaty, any aid granted by a Member State or through State resources in any form whatsoever which distorts or threatens to distort competition by favouring certain undertakings or the production of certain goods shall, in so far as it affects trade between Member States, be incompatible with the common market."

This sets out the characteristics of a "state aid" and states that the award of a state aid will be unlawful unless compatible with the common market, which is achieved either by applying a block exemption or notification.

Five cumulative criteria shall be present for a "state aid" to exist:

1. "the use of state resources"
2. "the measure must confer an advantage to a certain undertaking"
3. "the advantage must be selective"
4. "the measure must distort competition"
5. "affect trade between member states".

Almost all state aid is awarded under block exemptions. For example, 96% of state aid is awarded under the General Block Exemption Regulation. States can award state aid via notification of the European Commission DG Competition under guidelines such as the Regional Aid Guidelines (RAG), the Climate, Energy, and Environmental Aid Guidelines (CEEAG), the Risk Finance Guidelines (RFG), and the Research, Development, and Innovation Framework (RDI).

== History ==
State aid was formally introduced into European Union statute law by the Treaty of Rome, which classified state aid as any state intervention that distorted competition law. The European Commission announced plans to reform state aid in relation to research and development and innovation in 2006, in order to support the EU's overall strategy to enhance innovation, and the definition of state aid was later updated by the Treaty on the Functioning of the European Union in 2007. It stated that any aid given to a company by a state within the EU would generally be incompatible with the EU's Common Market. Within the new law under the treaty, the first chapter defines what is not allowed to be done with state aid, and the second chapter defines actions that can be done within legal limits. 1. Save as otherwise provided in the Treaties, any aid granted by a Member State or through State resources in any form whatsoever which distorts or threatens to distort competition by favouring certain undertakings or the production of certain goods shall, in so far as it affects trade between Member States, be incompatible with the internal market.

The intent of this was that, in order to avoid favouring a certain company or commercial group, an EU member state should not provide support by financial aid, lesser taxation rates, or other means to a party that does normal commercial business. For example, it would be considered illegal state aid by the EU if a government took over an unprofitable company with the sole intent to keep it running at a loss. However, state aid can be approved by the European Commission in individual circumstances but the aid can be reclaimed by the EU if it breaches the treaty.

There are specific exemptions to the treaty's provisions with regard to state aid. State aid can be given to parties involved in charity or "to promote culture and heritage conservation". The treaty also stated that aid given in response to natural disasters would be lawful. An exemption was given to allow Germany to provide aid, provided the aid was used in relation to promoting development in former East German locations affected by the division of Germany after Germany's loss in the Second World War.

=== Temporary Framework during the COVID-19 Outbreak ===
In order to allow member states to rapidly respond to the COVID-19 outbreak, on 20 March 2020, the European Commission issued a temporary framework for state aid measures, allowing member states more flexibility in providing direct financial aid and loans beyond the existing possibilities of Article 107. The measures were originally set to expire on 31 December 2020. The measures specifically allowed for:

- Direct grants, advances, or tax advantages with certain ceilings
- Guarantees on loans
- Subsidised interest rates
- Guarantees and loans that are channelled through banks
- Short-term export-credit insurance

The framework was extended for another year on 28 January 2021, and expanded to double the ceilings for direct aid, the conversion of loans into grants, and the suspension of the list of countries with "marketable risk" for short-term export credit. On 18 November 2021, the EU announced that it would extend the measures for another six months, also introducing investment incentives and solvency support measures. In May 2022, the EU announced that the framework would not be renewed beyond the expiry date of 30 June 2022, although it allowed restructuring of loans into direct grants until 30 June 2023. The EU estimates that a total of 3.2 trillion euros of state aid were granted via the temporary framework.

== Limitations of the EU State Aid ==
The EU jurisdiction is a rare case where specific binding legal provisions were introduced for controlling state aid. These provisions in principle require the commission to authorise all grants of aid, which has proven to be a difficult, if not impossible, task with 27 EU member states. This control may seem unnecessary, as most subsidies (tax breaks) are supposed to "induce new firms to locate in the subsidizing state". The argument is that since countries are keen to compete for bringing firms into their territory by providing good infrastructure, education, health care, etc., state aid should not differ much (e.g., locational aid). Even though the argument cannot be dismissed prima facie, it is based on " the assumption that the lengths of the political and the economic cycles are the same". This assumption is incorrect since political cycles are much shorter than economic cycles and even under rigorous fiscal disciplines policy-makers keep up the positive incentives to grant an "excessive amount of state aid (in comparison to real advantages)". Introducing limitations and controlling state aid is necessary to hinder the issuance of excessive state aids, which is especially relevant in the case of the Union that lacks a strict balanced budget constraint and mainly operates with a single currency (the euro). According to Alberto Heimler and Frédéric Jenny, "State aid provisions are a discipline for member states." However, the Commission may temporarily exempt aids that remedy serious economic disturbances provided the disturbance is narrowly and strictly defined. The European Court of Justice further disciplines the EU member states and enforces the limitation. Introduction of state aid provisions would be beneficial for all countries but governments tend to distance themselves from imposing disciplining devices unless there is an international treaty that does so. For countries that are not part of the EU, aid limitations arise from the World Trade Organization agreements which prohibit subsidies exclusively when they are directed to the distortion of international trade as strictly defined. These agreements also recognize what is known as the actionable subsidies that can be prohibited when the complaining country shows the adverse effect the subsidy has on its interests. In particular, the prohibition may occur when a serious injury is caused to:

- "the importing country's domestic industry"
- "rival exporters in a third country trying to compete with a subsidized exporter"
- "exporters trying to compete with subsidized domestic firms".

However, due to the lack of specifications, definitions and in some cases clarifications, the WTO case is highly controversial and more of an exception than a rule. A solution to this would be a more thorough regime somewhat in line with that of the European Union. In that case, the prohibition of state subsidies would occur if the subsidies were anti-competitive and affected international trade.

== United Kingdom's Subsidy Control regime ==
The EU–UK Trade and Cooperation Agreement of December 2020 required the UK to introduce a system of subsidy regulation based upon similar principles to EU State aid law.

The UK chose to establish its own system of control called "Subsidy Control" that aims not only to satisfy its international commitments but also to protect the UK internal market from the damaging effects of unnecessary or excessive subsidies.

This regime is primarily based upon the Subsidy Control Act 2022, but also takes account of the Windsor Framework and to their international commitments made by the UK.

The Subsidy Control regime requires public authorities to assess the presence of ‘subsidy’ and where this is found to follow one of seven routes set out in the Subsidy Control Act 2022 to achieve compliance.

Subsidy Control is a ‘challenge regime’ in which a decision to award a subsidy can be challenged and, if found to be in breach of the Subsidy Control Act 2022 the award can be clawed back from the recipient with interest.

== Examples ==
=== Banking Crisis ===
In 2008, the British government was granted permission from the European Commission to provide state aid to nationalise Lloyds TSB during the 2008 financial crisis. However, the Commission decreed that because Lloyds TSB's financial requirements had come about from their takeover of HBOS, in order for the state aid to be legal, they would have to sell part of their business. Lloyds Bank did this by splitting off TSB Bank as a separate company initially owned by them and sold it to Banco de Sabadell in order to stay within the EU's rules on state aid.

=== Apple taxation case ===
In 2016, following a 2-year investigation, the European Commission ruled that Ireland had given tax rulings to Apple Inc that acted as a form of illegal state aid under EU competition law. Apple has been using a customized variation of the "double Irish" tax avoidance system (used by many US multinationals in Ireland). The rulings from the Irish Revenue Commissioners, which enabled the customization, were deemed to be unfair state aid. The Commission stated that as a result, Apple would have to pay €13 billion in Irish taxes (2004–2014), plus interest penalties, to the Irish government. The Irish cabinet stated they would challenge the commission's finding of state aid and would appeal against the ruling.
