= Netherlands Authority for Consumers and Markets =

Competition regulator in The Netherlands

Logo

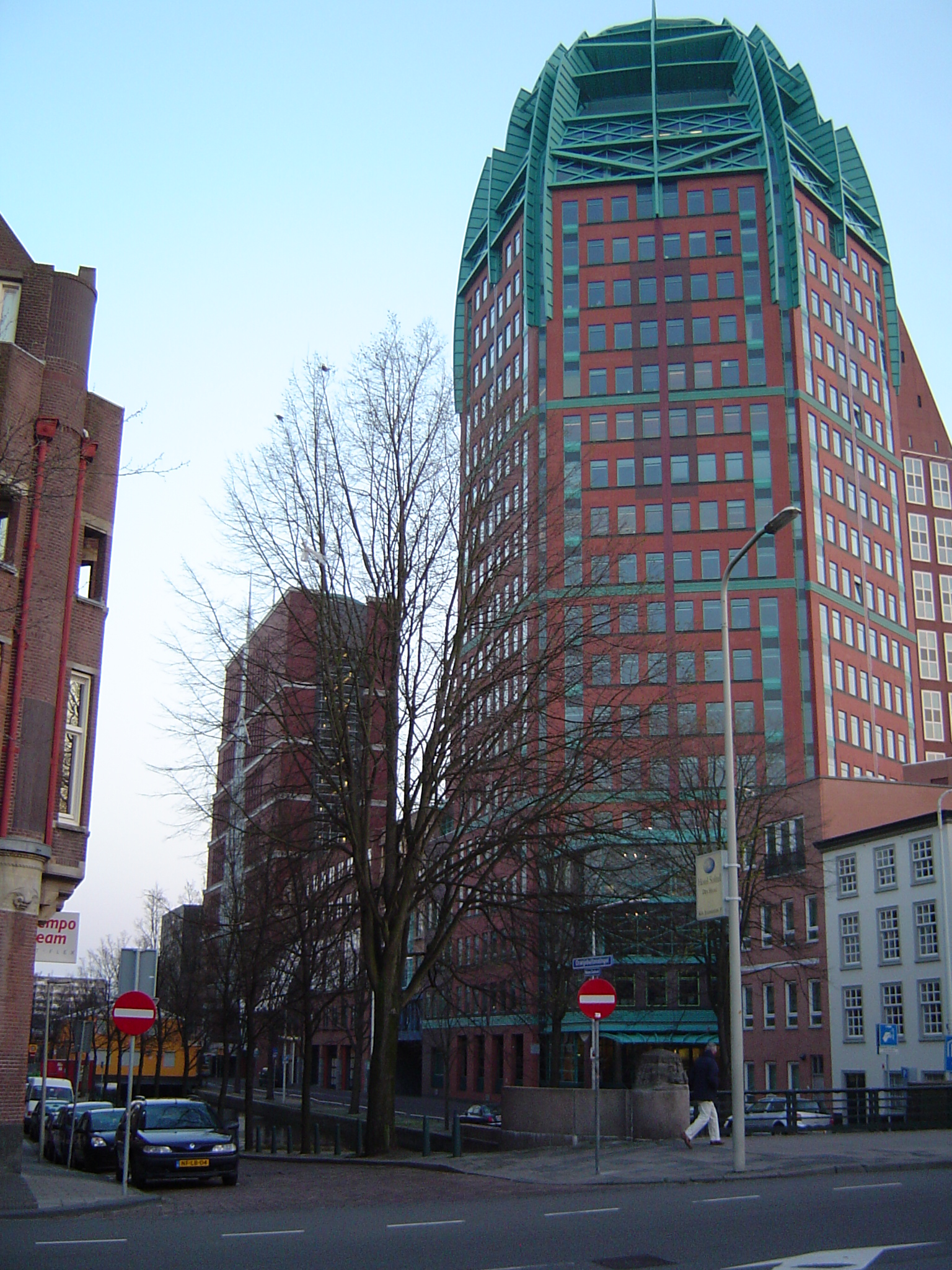
ACM is headquartered in the Zurichtoren in The Hague.

The Netherlands Authority for Consumers and Markets (Dutch: Autoriteit Consument & Markt (ACM)) is the competition regulator in the Netherlands. It is a regulatory authority based in The Hague. It is charged with competition oversight, sector-specific regulation of several sectors, and enforcement of consumer protection laws. It enforces Section 24 of the Dutch Competition Act.

== Organisation ==
The Authority falls under the responsibility of the Ministry of Economic Affairs and employs around 600 persons, divided over multiple Directions e.g. Direction of Consumers, Competition, Healthcare, Transportation etc.

== History ==
ACM was founded on 1 April 2013 through the merger of the Consumer Authority (Consumentenautoriteit, CA), the Independent Postal and Telecommunications Authority (Onafhankelijke Post en Telecommunicatie Autoriteit, OPTA), and the Netherlands Competition Authority (Nederlandse Mededingingsautoriteit, NMa).

== Notable cases ==
In 2017 ACM imposed a fine of 41 million euros on Nederlandse Spoorwegen for abuse of its position by means of predatory pricing and related practices.

In 2018 it revoked the energy licence of One Select, a sister company of the UK energy supplier, because it could no longer “comply with the requirements of its energy licence”. It approved the takeover by HeadFirst Source Group NV of Myler, a Dutch contract management and global sourcing company. It forced VodafoneZiggo and KPN to open up their fixed networks to third party providers after a market analysis of Wholesale Fixed Access showed that between them they dominated the market. It set new prices for water and electricity on Bonaire from 1 April 2018.

In 2020, ACM fined tobacco makers British American Tobacco, Philip Morris, Japan Tobacco International and Van Nelle a total of 82 million euros ($95.7 million) for illegally exchanging information about future pricing plans in the 2008-2011 period.

In 2022, ACM levied ten weekly fines totaling 50 million euros ($55 million) against Apple Inc. for failure to comply with an order to make it possible for dating app providers in the Netherlands to use non-Apple payment methods.
