= Consten SaRL and Grundig GmbH v Commission =

EU competition law case

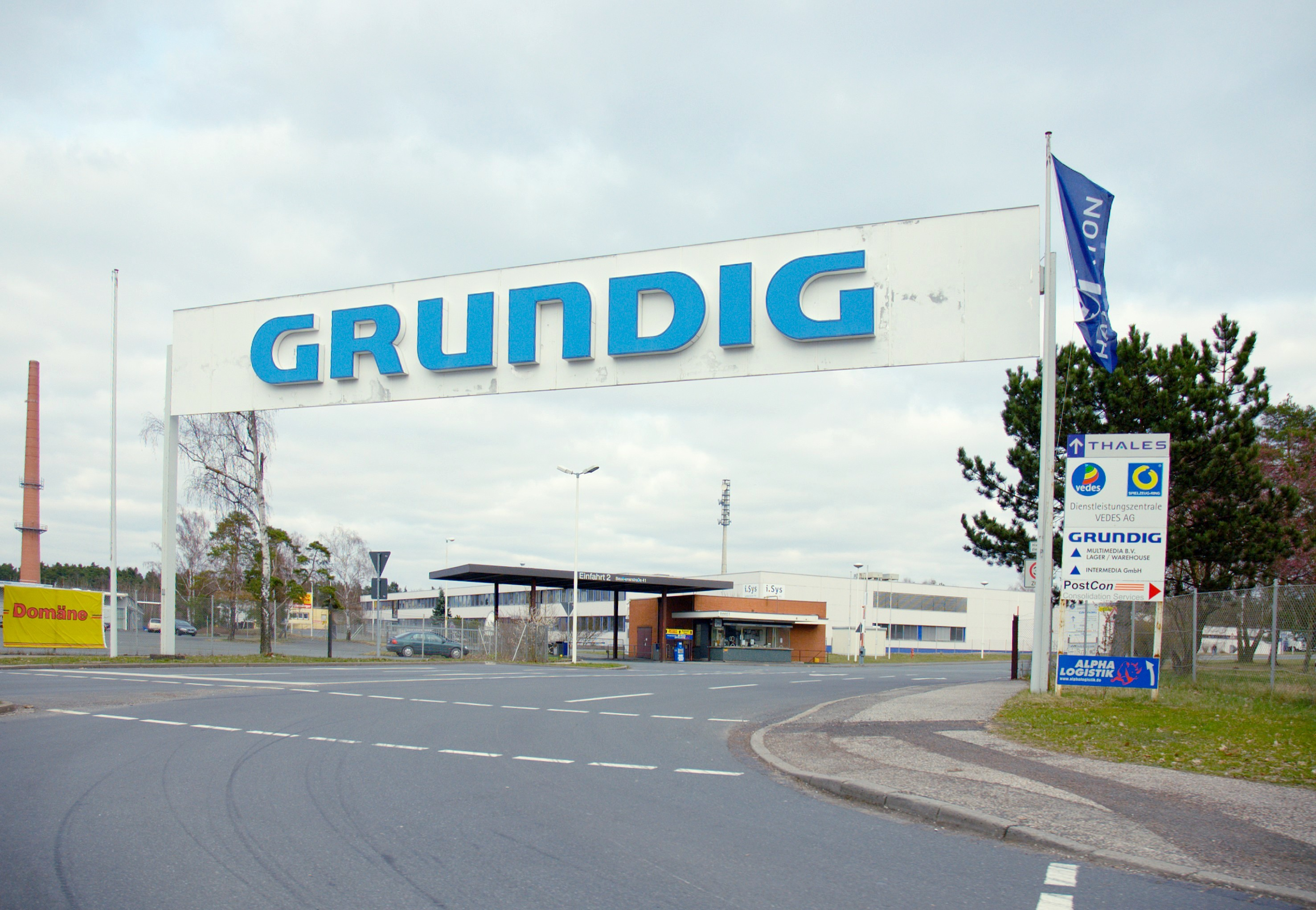
- Court: European Court of Justice
- Citations: (1966) Case 56/64 and 58/64, [1966] ECR 299

Keywords
- Competition, collusion

Consten SaRL and Grundig GmbH v Commission (1966) Case 56/64 is an EU competition law case, concerning vertical anti-competitive agreements.

== The Treaty provisions ==
- Art 101(1): The following shall be prohibited as incompatible with the common market: all agreements between undertakings, decisions by associations of undertakings and concerted practices which may affect trade between Member States and which have as their object or effect the prevention, restriction or distortion of competition within the common market.
- Art 101(2): Any agreements or decisions prohibited pursuant to this section shall be automatically void.
- Art 101(3): This subsection gives a list of derogations (or exceptions).

== Facts ==
Grundig GmbH contracted to distribute its electronic goods in France, and appointed Consten SaRL as its exclusive distributor. Grundig guaranteed that no other wholesaler would be allowed to distribute in France, and that, for the purposes of the distribution of Grundig products, Consten was given sole authority to use the Grundig name and emblems which are registered in Germany and in other Member States

A third-party company, UNEF, bought Grundig products in Germany and began distributing "grey imports" into France, whereupon Consten and Grundig sought to prevent UNEF from doing so, claiming, inter alia, that UNEF was abusing Grundig's trade-mark in its own trade name and logos.

The Commission viewed Consten's and Grundig's action against UNEF as an unlawful breach of Article 85 of the Treaty of Rome (now Art 101 of the TFEU), as it was important to ensure that competing parallel imports from one state to another were unhindered. The case was referred for a Preliminary Ruling to the European Court of Justice under Article 177.

== Judgment ==
Agreeing with the Commission, the ECJ held that the agreement was unlawful. It rejected the argument that allowing exclusive distributorships protected a distributor's legitimate interest, by hypothetically preventing competitors (once the costs for initial market penetration had been spent) from free riding on the investment of advertising and marketing initially by the distributor, and then undercutting prices.

8. [...] An agreement between producer and distributor which might tend to restore the national divisions in trade between Member States might be such as to frustrate the most fundamental objectives of the Community. The Treaty, whose preamble and content aim at abolishing the barriers between States, and which in several provisions gives evidence of a stern attitude with regard to their reappearance, could not allow undertakings to reconstruct such barriers.

== See also ==
- EU competition law
- United Brands v Commission
