= Onafhankelijke Post en Telecommunicatie Autoriteit =

- Abbreviation: OPTA
- Successor: Netherlands Authority for Consumers and Markets
- Formation: 1997
- Dissolved: 2013
- Website: opta.nl at the Wayback Machine (archived 2006-02-03)

The Onafhankelijke Post en Telecommunicatie Autoriteit (OPTA, English: Independent Post and Telecommunications Authority) was an independent Dutch government agency charged with enforcing Dutch law on telecommunication, post and cable TV services that operated between 1997 and 2013. It was set up in 1997 as part of major government changes in the Dutch telecommunication sector and was absorbed by the Netherlands Authority for Consumers and Markets in April 2013.

Headquartered in The Hague, it was created to ensure competitiveness in the newly opened Dutch market for telephony and other telecom activities. Prior to 1997, KPN had a monopoly on the Dutch market, but after deregulation, other companies could also enter the market. It was OPTAs responsibility to make sure that KPN would not push the new players out of the market through its sheer size.

The Dutch cable TV network is one of the densest in the world, with over 95 percent of Dutch households having access to cable TV. OPTA also used to regulate this market, and was a mediator in disputes between providers, although OPTA decisions could be appealed in court.

OPTA's function and legal position were similar to the American Federal Communications Commission.
