= Block Exemption Regulation =

The Block Exemption Regulation is an exemption in a business line or industry, which debars organizations in the industry from some business activities in order to create competition. The regulation is highly known in the automobile industry due to the effect caused by the Block Exemption Regulation (BER) from the European Commission. BER has changed the automobile industry in the last decade. Prior to 2003 automobile owners in the EU region risk nullifying their vehicle warranty when the vehicles were serviced or repaired in workshops not belonging to the vehicle manufacturer or its dealers. This barrier was broken in October 2003, when the European Commission (EC) passed a law allowing vehicle owners the freedom of having their servicing and repairs done at their chosen workshop.

According to the UK Department of Business Education & Skills, the empowerment created by this law provides competition in the automobile industry as vehicle owners now have the opportunity to repair and service their vehicle at alternative workshops to the automobile manufacturers. BER provides automobile users the flexibility and benefit to reduce the amount spent on servicing, thereby providing consumers more choice and better value for money.

== Background ==
In October 2002 a BER was passed into law and it came fully into effect in October 2003. The regulation was passed into law because the preceding law did not cover adequately some key point. The October 2002 BER focused on new automobile sales, after-sales and distribution. The preceding BER did not cover the following points adequately:

- Competition between dealers of the same brand
- Problems occurring for cross-border sales
- The need to strengthen dealers’ position vis-à-vis manufacturers
- Competition in the after-sales servicing

The AIRC, Association International des Reparateurs en Carrosserie, made clear that the after sales market needed a satisfactory framework that would not threaten consumers’ freedom, insurance companies freedom, fleet owners freedom and leasing companies freedom to have their vehicles repaired in the workshop of their choice. ( AIRC General Secretary Karel Bukholczer, see source https://ec.europa.eu/competition/consultations/2010_motor_vehicles/airc_en.pdf )

In May 2010 a new law was passed by the European Commission Competition legislatives, THis law came into effect from June 1, 2010.

== The automobile industry ==
Several countries in the EU region responded to the EC block exemption regulations with strategies to enforce them, making competition better among automobile dealers and manufacturers in their countries. An example of this is the ‘Car Notice’ passed by the Swiss Competition Commission in 2002.

A transition period was provided by the European Commission extends the previous 2002 for three years, till 2013. During this three years only the sales of new cars are affected by the new BER passed by the EC which came into effect on 1 June 2010.

== See also ==
- Competition Commission (United Kingdom)
- EU competition law
