= Article 101 of the Treaty on the Functioning of the European Union =

European Union competition law

Article 101 of the Treaty on the Functioning of the European Union (formerly Article 81 of the Treaty Establishing the European Community) prohibits cartels and other agreements that could disrupt free competition in the European Economic Area's internal market.

== Aims and objectives ==
Conventional wisdom declares that the aim of domestic competition law (such as that of the UK) is to provide a remedy to litigants whose interests are damaged by the anti-competitive behaviour of others, whereas the EU takes a broader view and has the goal of maintaining transparent markets and a "level playing field". Thus, the main objectives of the EU competition law are to maintain openness and to unify the internal market; to ensure economic efficiency in the marketplace; to ensure the conditions of effective competition and competitiveness; and to protect consumers.

However, some argue that the goals of the Article are unclear. There are two main schools of thought: the predominant view is that only consumer welfare considerations are relevant there. An alternative view is that other Member State and European Union public policy goals (such as public health and the environment) should also be considered there.

== Text of Article 101 ==
Article 101 reads,

1. The following shall be seen as incompatible with the internal market: all agreements between undertakings, decisions by associations of undertakings and concerted practices which may affect trade between Member States and which have as their object or effect the prevention, restriction or distortion of competition within the internal market, and in particular those which:

(a) directly or indirectly fix purchase or selling prices or any other trading conditions;
(b) limit or control production, markets, technical development, or investment;
(c) share markets or sources of supply;
(d) apply dissimilar conditions to equivalent transactions with other trading parties, thereby placing them at a competitive disadvantage;
(e) make the conclusion of contracts subject to acceptance by the other parties of supplementary obligations which, by their nature or according to commercial usage, have no connection with the subject of such contracts.

2. Any agreements or decisions prohibited pursuant to this article shall be automatically void.

3. The provisions of paragraph 1 may, however, be declared inapplicable in the case of:

any agreement or category of agreements between undertakings,
any decision or category of decisions by associations of undertakings,
any concerted practice or category of concerted practices,

which contributes to improving the production or distribution of goods or to promoting technical or economic progress, while allowing consumers a fair share of the resulting benefit, and which does not:

(a) impose on the undertakings concerned restrictions which are not indispensable to the attainment of these objectives;
(b) afford such undertakings the possibility of eliminating competition in respect of a substantial part of the products in question.

Businesses ("undertakings") infringing the provisions of Article 101 are liable to a fine of up to 10% of its worldwide annual turnover by the European Commission. However, Member States usually have their own domestic competition law which they may enforce, provided it is not contrary to EU law. The role of the Commission is the area is quasi-judicial and subject to appeal to the ECJ.

In Courage v. Crehan, the European Court of Justice (ECJ) ruled that article 101 TFEU has direct horizontal effect and that individuals can invoke article 101 TFEU to claim damages as a result of a breach of said article by another party.

== Undertakings ==
Article 101 TFEU does not specifically ban cartels, instead declaring as illegal all "agreements, decisions and concerted practices" which are anti-competitive and which distort the single market. The term "undertaking" is a Eurospeak word for any person(s) or firms in an enterprise, and is used to describe those "engaged in an economic activity". The term excludes (i) employees, who are by their "very nature the opposite of the independent exercise of an economic or commercial activity", and (ii) public services based on "solidarity" for a "social purpose".

== Collusion ==
Undertakings must then have formed an agreement, developed a "concerted practice", or, within an association, taken a decision. Like US antitrust, this just means all the same thing. According to Advocate General Reischl in Van Landewyck [1980], there is no need to distinguish an agreement from a concerted practice, because they are merely convenient labels. Any kind of dealing or contact, or a "meeting of the minds" between parties, could potentially be counted as illegal collusion.

This includes both horizontal (e.g. between retailers) and vertical (e.g. between retailers and suppliers) agreements, effectively outlawing the operation of cartels within the EU. Article 101 has been construed very widely to include both informal agreements (gentlemen's agreements) and concerted practices where firms tend to raise or lower prices at the same time without having physically agreed to do so. However, a coincidental increase in prices will not in itself prove a concerted practice, there must also be evidence that the parties involved were aware that their behaviour may prejudice the normal operation of the competition within the common market. This latter subjective requirement of knowledge is not, in principle, necessary in respect of agreements. As far as agreements are concerned the mere anticompetitive effect is sufficient to make it illegal even if the parties were unaware of it or did not intend such effect to take place.

== Self-employment ==
According to the Commission, in the context of platform work, "self-employed are in principle considered as undertakings and risk infringing Article 101 if they negotiate collectively their fees and other trading conditions", but also that there exist "circumstances in which solo self-employed are comparable to workers and thus not subject to Article 101".

== State measures ==
In exceptional cases, article 101 TFEU can also be applied to government regulation. In Van Eycke v. ASPA, the Court has found that article 101 "require[s] the Member States not to introduce or maintain in force measures, even of a legislative nature, which may render ineffective the competition rules applicable to undertakings". The Court continues, saying that such would be the case "if a Member State were to require or favour the adoption of agreements, decisions or concerted practices contrary to Article 85 or to reinforce their effects, or to deprive its own legislation of its official character by delegating to private traders responsibility for taking decisions affecting the economic sphere".

== Trade between Member States ==
Article 101 covers agreements and anti-competitive practices that might affect "trade between Member States". This provision has been interpreted broadly: for example, several agreements amongst firms with no production in the EU have been considered to affect trade between Member States. In the Webb-Pomerene case, EU law was applied to a US cartel with no production in the EU. The ECJ has also held that "trade between Member States" includes "trade between regions of a Member State", to prevent cartels "carving up" territories for their own benefit.

== Exemptions ==
Exemptions to Article 101 behaviour fall into three categories. First, Article 101(3) creates an exemption where the practice is beneficial to consumers, e.g., by facilitating technological advances (efficiencies), but does not restrict all competition in the area. In practice very few official exemptions were given by the Commission and a new system for dealing with them is currently under review. Secondly, the Commission has agreed to exempt 'Agreements of minor importance' (except those fixing sale prices) from Article 101. This exemption applies to small companies, together holding no more than 10% of the relevant market in the case of horizontal agreements and 15% each in the case of vertical agreements (the de minimis condition). In this situation as with Article 102 (see below), market definition is a crucial, but often highly difficult, matter to resolve. Thirdly, the Commission has also introduced a collection of block exemptions for different types of contract and in particular in the case of vertical agreements. These include a list of permitted contract terms, and a list of those banned in these exemptions (the so-called hardcore restrictions).

== See also ==
- Article 102 of the Treaty on the Functioning of the European Union
- Competition law
- United States antitrust law
