= 1694 in art =

Events from the year 1694 in art.

== Events ==
- A copy is made of the 14th century Siyar-i Nabi (Life of the Profet) of al-Zarir, Istanbul, Turkey. It is now kept at New York Public Library, New York Spencer Collection.

== Paintings ==
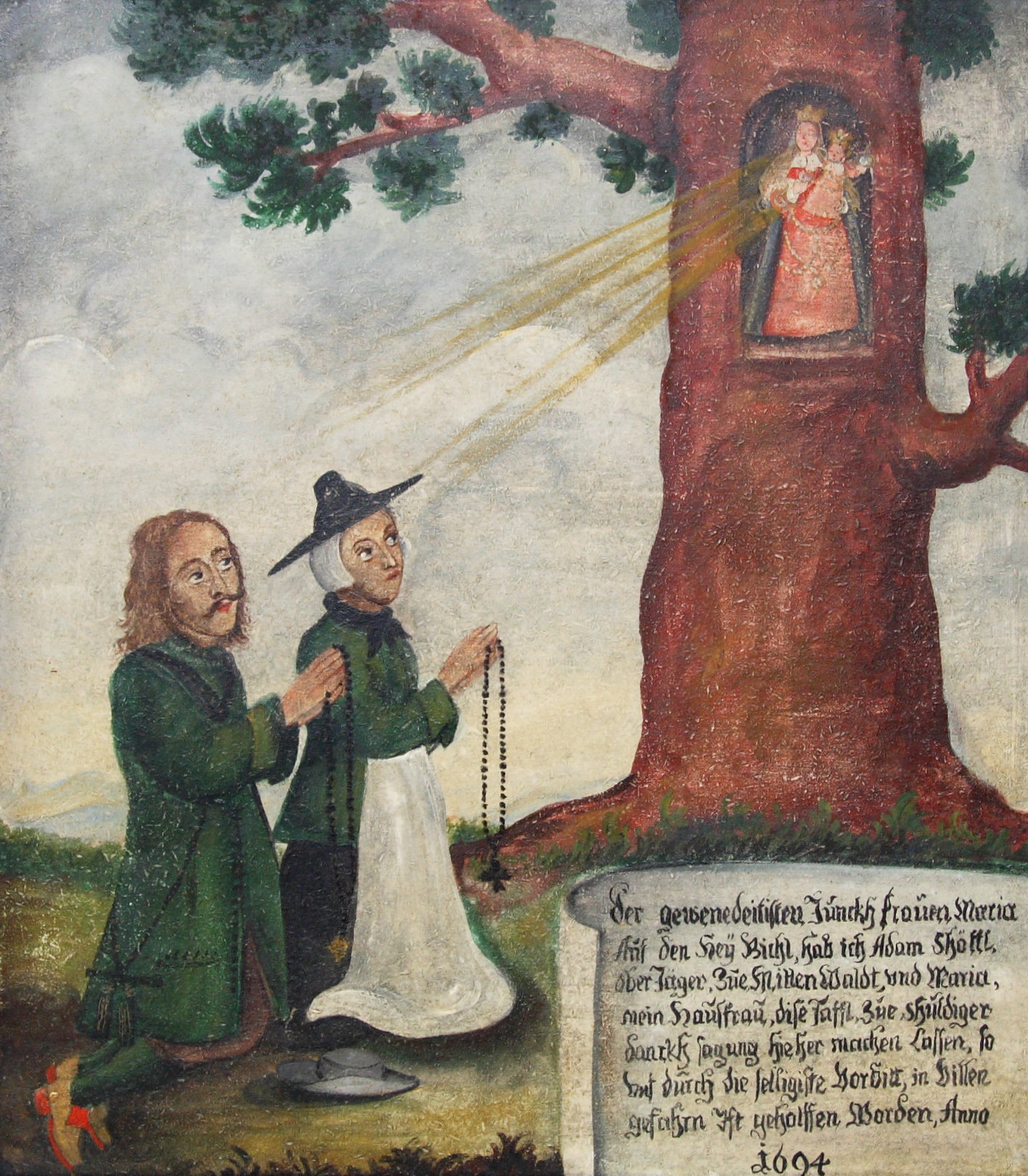
unknown artist, Votive tablet from the Heuwinkl Chapel in Iffeldorf. It depicts the Virgin Mary's image placed in a hollow oak tree which was the destination of many pilgrims

- Louis Laguerre – Painted Room at Chatsworth House, England, completed
- Andrea Pozzo – Trompe-l'œil paintings on dome, apse and ceiling of Sant'Ignazio Church, Rome, completed

== Births ==
- February 18 – Johann Christoph Handke, Moravian Baroque painter (died 1774)
- May 22 – Daniel Gran, Austrian painter of frescoes and altar paintings (died 1757)
- June 27 – John Michael Rysbrack, Flemish sculptor (died 1770)
- July 11 – Charles-Antoine Coypel, French painter, art commentator, and playwright (died 1752)
- September – Pietro Bianchi, Italian painter of the Baroque period, active in Genoa and Rome (died 1740)
- September 9 – John Vanderbank, English portrait painter and book illustrator (died 1739)
- date unknown
  - Jacques-Ignace de La Touche, French painter of miniatures and portraits (died 1781)
  - Ottone Hamerani, Italian medallist (died 1761)
  - Pierre-Jean Mariette, art collector (died 1774)
  - Vincenzo Meucci, Italian painter with many patrons, including Anna Maria Luisa de' Medici (died 1766)
  - Giuseppe Pedretti, Italian painter of lunettes and altarpieces (died 1770)

== Deaths ==
- May 2 – Martin Desjardins, French sculptor and stuccoist of Dutch birth (born 1637)
- July – John Michael Wright, British baroque portrait painter (born 1617)
- July 25 – Hishikawa Moronobu, Japanese painter (born 1618)
- August 6 – Gabriel de la Corte, Spanish painter (born 1648)
- December 2 – Pierre Paul Puget, French artist (born 1620)
- December 12 – Filippo Lauri, Italian painter, became the Principe or director of the Accademia di San Luca (born 1623)
- date unknown
  - Thomas Heeremans, Dutch Golden Age painter (born 1641)
  - Giacomo Lauri, Italian engraver of the Baroque period (born 1623)
  - Crisóstomo Martinez, Valencian painter and engraver known for his anatomical atlas (born 1638)
  - Giovanni Peruzzini, Italian painter of lunettes and religious themed works (born 1629)
  - Antonio Sacchi, Italian painter (date of birth unknown)
  - Ludovico Trasi, Italian painter of the Baroque period, born and active in Ascoli Piceno (born 1634)
