= Sacchi =

Sacchi is an Italian surname. Notable people with the surname include:

- Ada Sacchi Simonetta (1874–1944), Italian librarian and women's rights activist
- Andrea Sacchi (1599–1661), Italian Baroque painter
- Antonio Sacchi (died 1694), Italian Baroque painter
- Arrigo Sacchi (born 1946), Italian footballer and manager
- Bartolomeo Sacchi (1421–1481), known as Bartolomeo Platina, Italian Renaissance humanist writer and gastronomist
- Bruno Sacchi (1931-2011), Italian architect
- Carlo Sacchi (1617–1706), Italian Baroque painter
- Chiara Sacchi (born 2002), Argentine climate activist
- Donatella Sacchi (born 1959), Italian gymnast
- Enzo Sacchi (1926–1988), Italian cyclist
- Ettore Sacchi (1851–1924), Italian lawyer and politician
- Fabio Sacchi (born 1974), Italian cyclist
- Fabrizia Sacchi (born 1971), Italian actress
- Federico Sacchi (1936–2023), Argentine footballer
- Floraleda Sacchi (born 1978), Italian musician
- Francesca Sacchi Tommasi, Italian art dealer
- Franco Sacchi, Italian filmmaker and editor
- Gasparo Sacchi, Italian Renaissance painter
- Giuseppe Sacchi, Italian Baroque painter
- Louise Sacchi (1913–1997), American aviator and writer
- Luca Sacchi (born 1968), Italian swimmer, nephew of Mara
- Luigi Sacchi (1805–1861), Italian painter, wood engraver and photographer
- Mara Sacchi (born 1948), Italian swimmer
- Marietta Sacchi, Italian opera singer
- Massimo Sacchi (born 1950), Italian swimmer
- Nicoletta Sacchi (born 1949), Italian oncologist
- Pier Francesco Sacchi, Italian Renaissance painter
- Renato Sacchi (1928–2020), Italian sports shooter
- Robert Sacchi (1932–2021), American actor
- Tommaso Sacchi (born 1983), Italian politician
