= Albany International BV v Stichting Bedrijfspensioenfonds Textielindustrie =

Decision of the European Court of Justice

Albany BV v Stichting Bedrijfspensioenfonds Textielindustrie
- Court: European Court of Justice
- Citations: (1999) C-67/96, [1999] ECR I-5751, [2000] 4 CMLR 446

Court membership
- Judge sitting: Judge Rodriguez Iglesias

Case opinions
- AG Jacobs Opinion (28 January 1999)

Keywords
- Competition law, labour rights, pensions

Albany International BV v Stichting Bedrijfspensioenfonds Textielindustrie (1999) C-67/96 is an EU law case, concerning the boundary between European labour law and European competition law in the European Union.

== Facts ==
Albany International BV, a Dutch company, claimed that it should not be bound by a collective agreement to remain with a collective pension fund, as it alleged it was an "undertaking" that restricted competition. Albany BV was obliged by Dutch law to join a supplementary pension fund for workers within its industrial sector. Albany was in the industry pension (Stichting Bedrijfspensioenfonds Textielindustrie) since 1975. In 1981 it decided the pension was not generous enough. Albany BV entered into an arrangement providing enhanced benefits for its employees with an insurer. In 1989, the basis on which benefits under the compulsory scheme were paid out was improved, making it comparable with Albany's private arrangement. Albany therefore applied to be exempted from affiliation to the fund. The fund refused Albany's application and refused to follow the advice of the Insurance Board, requiring it to grant an exemption. The national court adopted the Board's decision, but stayed proceedings pending a reference to the ECJ on whether the Fund was an undertaking within the meaning of the EC Treaty article 85 (now TFEU article 101), article 86 (now TFEU article 102) and article 90 (now TFEU article 106). If so, it also asked whether compulsory fund membership nullified the effectiveness of competition rules applicable to undertakings, and if not, whether there were circumstances which could render compulsory membership incompatible with article 90.

== Judgment ==
=== Advocate General ===
Advocate General Jacobs gave his opinion that pension funds set up pursuant to collective agreements were wholly outside the scope of competition law.

A - Comparative overview

80 In France the prohibition of cartels is applicable to collective agreements between management and labour. According to the Conseil de la Concurrence (Competition Authority) collective agreements are not excluded by their nature from the material scope of the competition rules. Freedom of collective bargaining is seen as a mere variation of freedom of contract subject to similar general limitations including the prohibition of cartels. Trade unions are analysed as economic actors which jointly with the employers' side may influence the competitive process. However, after an analysis of the restrictive effects or a balancing of their anticompetitive features with their social advantages, the Conseil de la Concurrence has classified most of the clauses of the agreements under scrutiny as being compatible with the French competition rules.

81 A good example of that line of reasoning is an Avis (opinion) of the Conseil de la Concurrence in a case similar to the present cases which concerned the French system of prévoyance collective. That system provides social benefits which are complementary to the State social security system. It covers three kind of risks: first, illness and maternity, secondly, working incapacity and invalidity, thirdly, death. It is set up - at least partly - by sectoral collective agreements between management and labour. Those agreements designate inter alia an organisme de prévoyance as exclusive contractor to administer the funds. On joint application by management and labour, affiliation to the system is often made compulsory for the entire sector by a decision of the competent minister.

82 An association of assureurs-conseils which wanted to offer services on the market for prévoyance complained to the competition authority about the last two of the above features of the system, namely the contractor's exclusivity and the compulsory affiliation of employers which had not taken part in the collective bargaining process. The Conseil de la Concurrence held that the organismes de prévoyance provided services and that they therefore fell under the competition rules. Employers and employees were also subject to the rules of competition law, either directly or indirectly through their representatives, in so far as concerned the content of their collective agreements. In designating a single contractor, however, the employers' and employees' representatives were merely exercising their ordinary right to choose with which service provider to contract. As to the extension of the agreement to the entire sector, the Conseil held that it contributed, first, to equal conditions of competition in the sector and, secondly, to economic and social progress. There was therefore no infringement of the competition rules.

83 In Finland Law 480/1992 on competition (Laki kilpailunrajoituksista) excludes by its Article 2(1) agreements concerning the labour market from its scope of application. According to the travaux préparatoires collective agreements on working conditions are therefore sheltered from the competition rules. However, it is said, competition rules are applicable to collective agreements which are not concerned with working conditions, but for example with the commercial relations between the employer and his clients.

84 The Supreme Administrative Court decided on the scope of that exception in a case concerning a collective agreement in the paper industry which restricted the possibility for employers to subcontract to independent service providers certain tasks (e.g. cleaning) which were traditionally fulfilled by employees. The court held that only clauses directly affecting working conditions, such as for example wages, working time, and protection against dismissal, were excluded from the scope of the prohibition of cartels. The restrictions in question were therefore not covered by the exception. Employees were sufficiently protected by a legal provision prohibiting dismissal in case of subcontracting.

85 In Denmark Article 2(1) of the recently adopted law on competition provides that it is applicable to any kind of economic activity. According to the travaux préparatoires the notion of `economic activity' has to receive a wide interpretation and includes all kinds of economic activities on markets for goods and services. Neither a profit-making purpose nor a certain legal form are required for the law to be applicable.

86 Article 3 provides that the law is not applicable to wages and working conditions. According to the travaux préparatoires that exception is limited to the relationship between employers and employees.

87 It follows also from the travaux préparatoires that the exception contained in the new law must be interpreted in conformity with the interpretation of the former laws on monopolies. A judgment of the Supreme Court of 1965 is therefore still of importance. The court had to decide on rules in a collective agreement which resulted in excluding certain groups of consumers from the supply of clothes produced in a less expensive way. It held that the exception was not applicable since the agreement went further than regulating wages and working conditions. Furthermore, the law was applicable ratione personae to the `social partners' in so far as they were dealing with `such economic interests'. Thus, the Danish prohibition of cartels is applicable to rules in collective agreements which are `related to an economic activity' and which `do not concern wages or working conditions'.

88 In Germany the Federal Law against Restrictions on Competition (Gesetz gegen Wettbewerbsbeschränkungen, `GWB') excludes certain fields of the economy and agreements from its material scope of application. However, neither the labour market nor collective agreements are expressly mentioned.

89 The general prohibition of cartels concerns only agreements `in so far as they are likely to influence ... market conditions with respect to trade in goods or commercial services'. According to the travaux préparatoires dependent labour cannot be classified as `commercial services'. Thus, it is said, collective agreements between management and labour on wages and working conditions are sheltered from the prohibition of cartels.

90 The courts and the Federal Cartel Office have on several occasions had to consider the legality of collective agreements between management and labour which affected shop opening or more generally trading hours in certain sectors of industry, either directly, or indirectly through the regulation of working time schedules.

91 The Bundesarbeitsgericht (Federal Labour Court) held that collective agreements between management and labour fell as a matter of principle outside the material scope of the competition rules. There were several reasons. First, the court stated by way of introduction that collective bargaining was one of the activities protected by the fundamental rights granted by Article 9(3) of the Grundgesetz (German Basic Law). Secondly, the labour market enjoyed a special status (ordnungspolitische Sonderstellung). Thirdly, the conditions for paragraph 1 of the GWB to apply were not fulfilled: trade unions could not be classified as undertakings for the purpose of competition law, since they were not acting on the markets for goods or services. Thus, collective agreements were not agreements between undertakings. In consequence, the necessary preconditions for the conclusion of such agreements, namely the decision by employers to negotiate jointly, also had to enjoy antitrust immunity. Fourthly, a balancing of the interests involved was not possible because there were no clear normative criteria available. Fifthly, the prohibition of cartels would apply only in the case of abusive collusion by employers who intentionally used the framework of collective agreements to cover an anticompetitive cartel on the markets for goods or services.

92 The Bundeskartellamt (Federal Cartel Office) reached a different result. In an opinion on a collective agreement which harmonised directly the end of trading activity on Saturdays and holiday periods in the sector of wholesale distribution the Office held that such agreements directly affected the markets for goods and commercial services and were therefore not a priori sheltered from the application of paragraph 1 of the GWB. It distinguished those agreements from agreements merely regulating working time.

93 On a second occasion the Office went even further. Management and labour in the retail sector had agreed on harmonised working-time schedules which indirectly prevented shop owners from opening after a certain hour. The Office held that the regulation of working time through collective bargaining was a special case due to its dual nature. On the one hand, opening hours in retailing were an important factor of competition. The trade unions and employers influenced indirectly but effectively the activity of the employing undertakings on the markets for goods and services and were therefore engaged in an economic activity. On the other hand, collective bargaining was protected by fundamental rights in so far as it concerned working conditions. In that specific and exceptional case of conflict only a balancing of the interests involved could lead to a workable solution. In the case under examination the interest in competition had to prevail.

94 The Kammergericht (Higher Regional Court, Berlin), ruling on appeal on the same working-time schedules on which the Bundeskartellamt had commented, adopted a third line of reasoning. It held that neither collective agreements nor the contracting parties to such agreements were a priori excluded from the scope of application of the German cartel law. Collective agreements on working conditions and wages were nevertheless normally lawful under paragraph 1 of the GWB, since they were not likely to influence `market conditions with respect to trade in goods or commercial services'. As regards the particular collective agreements under scrutiny, the indirect but effective restrictive influence on shop opening hours on the market for goods led in principle to an infringement of the prohibition of cartels. However, agreements on working time were at the heart (im Kernbereich) of the German fundamental right to bargain collectively. Such agreements were fully sheltered from prohibitions contained in ordinary laws.

95 In the United Kingdom under the Fair Trading Act 1973 the Secretary of State could refer restrictive labour practices to the Monopolies and Mergers Commission for it to consider their impact on the public interest. Until recently that provision was never used: traditionally competition law has not been invoked in the United Kingdom to deal with industrial relations issues. In 1988 the first such reference was made under the Act: it concerned labour practices in television and film-making. The Monopolies and Mergers Commission concluded that the practices in question did not operate against the public interest. The position does not seem to be substantially different under the new Competition Act 1998, which is broadly modelled on Articles 85 and 86 of the Treaty.

96 In the United States trade union activities are in principle sheltered from the prohibition of cartels contained in Section 1 of the Sherman Act through a `statutory' and a `non-statutory' labour exemption. Those exemptions are however limited in their respective scope.

97 As to the `statutory' exemption, Congress enacted as early as 1914 the Clayton Act which was designed to confer antitrust immunity on unilateral activities of trade unions in the course of labour disputes. It provided inter alia that `[t]he labour of a human being is not a commodity or article of commerce'. Since the intention of the legislator was partly frustrated by the federal courts' narrow interpretation of the Act, Congress passed in 1932 the Norris-LaGuardia Act, which was meant to extend the scope of the previous exemption. In United States v Hutcheson the Supreme Court stated the three conditions for that statutory exception to apply. First, there must be a labour dispute. Secondly, the trade union must act in its 'self-interest'. Thirdly, the union must not combine with non-labour groups, i.e. employers.

98 Although the statutory exemption did not cover agreements between unions and employers, the Supreme Court recognised in its subsequent case-law the existence of a non-statutory exemption, albeit limited in principle to agreements on wages and working conditions. In Connell the Supreme Court stated:

'The non-statutory exemption has its source in the strong labour policy favouring the association of employees to eliminate competition over wages and working conditions. Union success in organising workers and standardising wages ultimately will affect price competition among employers, but the goals of federal labour law never could be achieved if these effects on business competition were held a violation of the antitrust laws. The Court therefore has acknowledged that labour policy requires tolerance for the lessening of business competition based on differences in wages and working conditions. ... Labour policy clearly does not require, however, that a union have freedom to impose direct restraints on competition among those who employ its members. Thus, while the statutory exemption allows unions to accomplish some restraints by acting unilaterally ..., the non-statutory exemption offers no similar protection when a union and a non-labour party agree to restrain competition in a business market.'

99 It will be helpful to examine briefly three major decisions of the United States Supreme Court on the scope of the non-statutory labour exemption.

100 United Mine Workers of America v Pennington concerned an alleged conspiracy between the trade unions and large coal companies to impose inter alia the wages contained in a collective agreement on all operators in the sector, regardless of their ability to pay, in order to force small employers out of business.

101 The majority (6-3) held that the behaviour did not enjoy antitrust immunity. The statutory exemption was not applicable since there was an agreement between a union and employers. A collective agreement on selling prices of coal would clearly be a violation of the antitrust rules. By contrast, wages were at the very heart of the matters on which employers and unions bargained. Therefore, the effect on the product market resulting from the elimination of competition based on wages among employers in a bargaining unit was in principle `not the kind of restraint Congress intended the Sherman Act to proscribe'. Accordingly, a union was entitled to conclude a wage agreement with a multi-employer bargaining unit and to seek, in pursuance of its own interests, and not by agreement with all or part of the employers of that unit, the same wages from other employers. However, `one group of employers may not conspire to eliminate competitors from the industry and the union is liable with the employers if it becomes a party to the conspiracy'. Therefore, the alleged agreement between the union and the large coal producers to secure uniform labour standards throughout the entire industry was not exempt from the antitrust laws.

102 Meat Cutters v Jewel Tea Co., which was decided on the same day, concerned shop opening hours. A local union representing virtually all the butchers in the area agreed with a trade association of food retailers that food store meat departments would be open only from 9 a.m. to 6 p.m. from Monday to Saturday inclusive. Faced with a strike unless it agreed to such terms, an employer signed the contract and then sued the union seeking invalidation under the Sherman Act.

103 The majority (6-3) held that the antitrust rules were not applicable, but disagreed on the reasoning. Three of the majority argued that the marketing-hours restriction was so intimately related to wages, hours of work and working conditions that bona fide, arm's-length bargaining for such a provision was exempt from the Sherman Act. The three other judges of the majority, who had dissented in Pennington, stated that collective bargaining activity on mandatory subjects of bargaining under the relevant labour laws was by its very nature not subject to antitrust law. They argued primarily that judges had to respect the intentions of the legislator and that there were no normative criteria available to an antitrust judge to distinguish beneficial from harmful collective agreements.

104 The minority expressed the view that the agreement directly concerned the product market and had no pro-competitive effects whatsoever. It was therefore prohibited by the Sherman Act.

105 In its recent decision in Brown v Pro Football the Supreme Court was faced with employers collectively and unilaterally imposing employment terms on their employees after a collective bargaining impasse. The case dealt with the somewhat special case of bargaining between the National Football League and the football players' union.

106 The majority (8-1) held that the non-statutory labour exemption shielded post-impasse agreements among several employers to implement the terms of the employers' last best good-faith wage offer, on the assumption that such conduct was unobjectionable as a matter of labour law and policy. It argued, first, that multi-employer bargaining itself was a well-established, important and pervasive method of collective bargaining, offering advantages to both management and labour. Secondly, to subject the practice in question to antitrust law was to require antitrust courts to answer a host of important practical questions about how collective bargaining on working conditions was to proceed - the very result the labour exemption sought to avoid. Thirdly, to permit antitrust liability threatened to introduce instability and uncertainty into the collective bargaining process.

107 The dissenting justice (Justice Stevens) expressed the view that neither the policies underlying the labour and antitrust statutes, nor the purpose of the non-statutory exemption, provided a justification for exempting from antitrust scrutiny collective action initiated by employers to depress wages below the level that would be produced in a free market.

108 The results of that comparative overview can be summarised as follows.

109 In all the systems examined collective agreements between management and labour are to some extent sheltered from the prohibition of anticompetitive cartels. However, that immunity is not unlimited.

110 The legal sources from which the immunity flows and the legal mechanisms through which it is reached differ widely. One can find

- supremacy of a fundamental right to bargain collectively (Germany),

- an express exemption in the antitrust or other statutes (Denmark, Finland, statutory exemption in the United States),

- creations of the courts (non-statutory exemption in the United States),

- the requirement of a specific condition, normally not fulfilled by the agreements in question, without which the prohibition of cartels is not infringed (Germany),

- application of the general conditions for an infringement of the prohibition of cartels in such a way as to lead to the desired result (France),

- a traditional practice of not applying the competition rules to industrial relations (United Kingdom).

111 The scope of immunity also varies. However, the courts regularly ask the following questions:

- Are the agreements under scrutiny concerned with wages, working time or other working conditions, which are core subjects of collective bargaining?

- To what extent do the agreements affect the markets for goods and services on which the employers operate?

- To what extent do the agreements affect third parties? Third parties potentially affected are undertakings acting on the same market which did not take part in the bargaining process, undertakings acting on other markets, and consumers.

- Do the agreements have an anticompetitive purpose?

- Is it more appropriate to apply hard and fast rules or to engage in a case by case balancing process of the conflicting interests involved?

112 Against that background, I turn now to the analysis of Article 85(1) of the Treaty. I will examine successively, first, the applicability ratione materiae of Article 85(1) of the Treaty, secondly, whether there is an agreement or concertation between undertakings and, thirdly, whether that concertation restricts competition to an appreciable extent.

[...]

124 As regards the social field, there is no provision in the Treaty which like Article 42 expressly excludes the application of the competition rules or makes it subject to a decision by the Council.

125 Furthermore, the Court has unequivocally upheld the applicability of the Community competition rules to a number of other `special' sectors which fall outside the scope of the competition rules in certain Member States. In those sectors, the applicability of the competition rules has frequently been contested, with arguments based on the special features of the sectors concerned and on the conflicting policy objectives enumerated in Article 3 of the Treaty.

126 The Court has however regularly rejected such arguments and applied Articles 85 and 86 to such sectors as transport, energy, banking and insurance on the basis that there are other mechanisms such as, for example, exemptions under Article 85(3) of the Treaty through which Community competition law allows account to be taken of the special characteristics of certain branches of the economy. In those cases the Court did not take the view that the existence of conflicting policy objectives - as contained for example in Article 3(f) (a common policy in the sphere of transport) and Article 3(t) (Community measures in the energy sector) - in itself precluded the application of the competition rules to the sectors concerned. It does not follow from the fact that the Community pursues a certain policy that that area of the economy is thereby excluded from the competition rules.

127 Moreover, and of particular relevance to the present cases, the Court has already accepted in a series of important decisions the principle that the competition rules apply to the social field, and in particular to employment and to pensions. Thus the Court accepted that principle as regards labour markets in Höfner and in Job Centre and as regards pensions in Poucet and in Fédération Française des Sociétés d'Assurances. It will be necessary to consider those cases more fully below. It suffices at this stage to note that, in examining whether the bodies concerned were to be classified as undertakings within the meaning of Article 85 or 86, the Court implicitly accepted that the competition rules applied ratione materiae in those areas. More recently in Sodemare the Court - without even examining whether private non-profit-making bodies engaged in health-care activities were to be classified as undertakings - simply applied the competition rules and found that there was no agreement within the meaning of Article 85(1).

[...]

(a) Is there a fundamental right to bargain collectively?

132 The Funds, the Netherlands and French Governments and the Commission maintain that it follows from a number of international legal instruments that in the Community legal order there is a fundamental right to bargain collectively. To apply Article 85(1) to those agreements, it is said, would be equivalent to depriving management and labour of that fundamental right.

133 Does the Community legal order really contain such a fundamental right? That is a seminal question since if there is such a right, any impairment of the substance of the right, even in the public interest, might be unlawful.

134 For analytical purposes, I will distinguish between three rights: first, the right of individuals to form and join a trade union or an association of employers; secondly, the general right of a trade union or association to take collective action in order to protect occupational interests; and, thirdly, the specific right at issue in the present cases of trade unions and associations of employers to bargain collectively.

135 The EC Treaty itself, although - as discussed below - encouraging collective bargaining, does not explicitly grant any of the three above rights.

[...]

179 The authors of the Treaty either were not aware of the problem or could not agree on a solution. The Treaty therefore does not give clear guidance. In those circumstances one has to draw a line according to established principles of interpretation. Since both sets of rules are Treaty provisions of the same rank, one set of rules should not take absolute precedence over the other and neither set of rules should be emptied of its entire content. Since the Treaty rules encouraging collective bargaining presuppose that collective agreements are in principle lawful, Article 85(1) cannot have been intended to apply to collective agreements between management and labour on core subjects such as wages and other working conditions. Accordingly, collective agreements between management and labour on wages and working conditions should enjoy automatic immunity from antitrust scrutiny.

[...]

194 Accordingly, my conclusion on antitrust immunity for collective agreements is that collective agreements between management and labour concluded in good faith on core subjects of collective bargaining such as wages and working conditions which do not directly affect third markets and third parties are not caught by Article 85(1) of the Treaty.

[...]

XI - Conclusion

Accordingly the questions referred in these cases should in my opinion be answered as follows:

(1) Article 85(1) of the Treaty is not infringed where representatives of employers and employees within a particular sector of the economy agree collectively to set up a single sectoral pension fund and apply jointly to the authorities to make affiliation to the fund compulsory for all persons belonging to that sector.

(2) Articles 5 and 85 of the Treaty are not infringed where, at the joint request of the representatives of employers and employees, a Member State makes participation in a sectoral pension scheme compulsory for all undertakings belonging to that sector.

(3) The Netherlands sectoral pension funds are `undertakings' within the meaning of the competition rules of the Treaty.

(4) Articles 90(1) and 86 of the Treaty preclude rules on compulsory affiliation to sectoral pension funds such as the rules encountered in the Netherlands only where, owing to the regulatory framework and the decree making affiliation compulsory, the funds are manifestly not in a position to satisfy demand and where the abolition of compulsory affiliation would not obstruct the performance of the services of general interest assigned to the funds.

Articles 90(1) and 86 of the Treaty preclude rules such as the Netherlands exemption guidelines in so far as they entitle the sectoral pension funds to take discretionary decisions on applications for individual exemption from compulsory affiliation which are subject only to marginal judicial review.

(5) In so far as national rules are held to be contrary to Articles 90(1) and 86 of the Treaty, they are inapplicable, subject to a potential restriction imposed by the Court on the effects ratione temporis of its ruling.

=== Court of Justice ===
The Court of Justice held that agreements made in the context of collective negotiations between employers and employees in pursuit of recognised social policy objectives were not caught by TFEU article 101 because the purpose of competition law was not to affect collective agreements, rather than to regulate anti-competitive business practices. There was no difficulty in compulsory affiliation with a sectoral pension fund, and competition law had no application. The pension fund was engaged in an economic activity, even though it was not profit making. It held a dominant position under TFEU article 102 but this was justified given the basis of the scheme in social solidarity. The Dutch government was entitled to consider whether an alternative of laying down minimum pension requirements would meet levels of pension payments achieved by compulsory fund membership.

58 Under Article 4(1) and (2) of the Agreement, the dialogue between management and labour at Community level may lead, if they so desire, to contractual relations, including agreements, which will be implemented either in accordance with the procedures and practices specific to management and labour and the Member States, or, at the joint request of the signatory parties, by a Council decision on a proposal from the Commission.

59 It is beyond question that certain restrictions of competition are inherent in collective agreements between organisations representing employers and workers. However, the social policy objectives pursued by such agreements would be seriously undermined if management and labour were subject to Article 85(1) of the Treaty when seeking jointly to adopt measures to improve conditions of work and employment.

[...]

77 It should be borne in mind that, in the context of competition law, the Court has held that the concept of an undertaking encompasses every entity engaged in an economic activity, regardless of the legal status of the entity and the way in which it is financed (see, in particular, Case C-41/90 Höfner and Elser [1991] ECR I-1979, paragraph 21; Poucet and Pistre, cited above, paragraph 17; and Fédération Française des Sociétés d'Assurance, cited above, paragraph 14).

78 Moreover, in Poucet and Pistre, cited above, the Court held that that concept did not encompass organisations charged with the management of certain compulsory social security schemes, based on the principle of solidarity. Under the sickness and maternity scheme forming part of the system in question, the benefits were the same for all beneficiaries, even though contributions were proportional to income; under the pension scheme, retirement pensions were funded by workers in employment; furthermore, the statutory pension entitlements were not proportional to the contributions paid into the pension scheme; finally, schemes with a surplus contributed to the financing of those with structural financial difficulties. That solidarity made it necessary for the various schemes to be managed by a single organisation and for affiliation to the schemes to be compulsory.

79 In contrast, in Fédération Française des Sociétés d'Assurance, cited above, the Court held that a non-profit-making organisation which managed a pension scheme intended to supplement a basic compulsory scheme, established by law as an optional scheme and operating according to the principle of capitalisation, was an undertaking within the meaning of Article 85 et seq. of the Treaty. Optional affiliation, application of the principle of capitalisation and the fact that benefits depended solely on the amount of the contributions paid by the beneficiaries and on the financial results of the investments made by the managing organisation implied that that organisation carried on an economic activity in competition with life assurance companies. Neither the social objective pursued, nor the fact that it was non-profit-making, nor the requirements of solidarity, nor the other rules concerning, in particular, the restrictions to which the managing organisation was subject in making investments altered the fact that the managing organisation was carrying on an economic activity.

80 The question whether the concept of an undertaking, within the meaning of Article 85 et seq. of the Treaty, extends to a body such as the sectoral pension fund at issue in the main proceedings must be considered in the light of those considerations.

81 The sectoral pension fund itself determines the amount of the contributions and benefits and the Fund operates in accordance with the principle of capitalisation.

82 Accordingly, by contrast with the benefits provided by organisations charged with the management of compulsory social security schemes of the kind referred to in Poucet and Pistre, cited above, the amount of the benefits provided by the Fund depends on the financial results of the investments made by it, in respect of which it is subject, like an insurance company, to supervision by the Insurance Board.

83 In addition, as is apparent from Article 5 of the BPW and Articles 1 and 5 of the Guidelines for exemption from affiliation, a sectoral pension fund is required to grant exemption to an undertaking where the latter has already made available to its workers for at least six months before the request was lodged on the basis of which affiliation to the fund was made compulsory, a pension scheme granting them rights at least equivalent to those which they would acquire if affiliated to the fund. Moreover, under Article 1 of the abovementioned Guidelines, that fund is also entitled to grant exemption to an undertaking which provides its workers with a pension scheme granting them rights at least equivalent to those deriving from the fund, provided that, in the event of withdrawal from the fund, compensation considered reasonable by the Insurance Board is offered for any damage suffered by the fund, from the actuarial point of view, as a result of the withdrawal.

84 It follows that a sectoral pension fund of the kind at issue in the main proceedings engages in an economic activity in competition with insurance companies.

85 In those circumstances, the fact that the fund is non-profit-making and the manifestations of solidarity referred to by it and the intervening governments are not sufficient to deprive the sectoral pension fund of its status as an undertaking within the meaning of the competition rules of the Treaty.

86 Undoubtedly, the pursuit of a social objective, the abovementioned manifestations of solidarity and restrictions or controls on investments made by the sectoral pension fund may render the service provided by the fund less competitive than comparable services rendered by insurance companies. Although such constraints do not prevent the activity engaged in by the fund from being regarded as an economic activity, they might justify the exclusive right of such a body to manage a supplementary pension scheme.

[...]

The third question

88 By its third question, the national court seeks essentially to ascertain whether Articles 86 and 90 of the Treaty preclude the public authorities from conferring on a pension fund an exclusive right to manage a supplementary pension scheme in a given sector.

89 The Netherlands Government contends that the order making affiliation compulsory has the sole effect of requiring workers in the sector concerned to be affiliated to the Fund. The order does not, in its view, confer on the Fund an exclusive right in the area of supplementary pensions. Nor does the Fund hold a dominant position within the meaning of Article 86 of the Treaty.

90 It must be observed at the outset that the decision of the public authorities to make affiliation to a sectoral pension fund compulsory, as in this case, necessarily implies granting to that fund an exclusive right to collect and administer the contributions paid with a view to accruing pension rights. Such a fund must therefore be regarded as an undertaking to which exclusive rights have been granted by the public authorities, of the kind referred to in Article 90(1) of the Treaty.

91 Next, it should be noted that according to settled case-law an undertaking which has a legal monopoly in a substantial part of the common market may be regarded as occupying a dominant position within the meaning of Article 86 of the Treaty (see Case C-179/90 Merci Convenzionali Porto di Genova [1991] ECR I-5889, paragraph 14, and Case C-18/88 GB-Inno-BM [1991] ECR I-5941, paragraph 17).

92 A sectoral pension fund of the kind at issue in the main proceedings, which has an exclusive right to manage a supplementary pension scheme in an industrial sector in a Member State and, therefore, in a substantial part of the common market, may therefore be regarded as occupying a dominant position within the meaning of Article 86 of the Treaty.

93 It must not be forgotten, however, that merely creating a dominant position by granting exclusive rights within the meaning of Article 90(1) of the Treaty is not in itself incompatible with Article 86 of the Treaty. A Member State is in breach of the prohibitions contained in those two provisions only if the undertaking in question, merely by exercising the exclusive rights granted to it, is led to abuse its dominant position or when such rights are liable to create a situation in which that undertaking is led to commit such abuses (Höfner and Elser, cited above, paragraph 29; Case C-260/89 ERT [1991] ECR I-2925, paragraph 37; Merci Convenzionali Porto di Genova, cited above, paragraphs 16 and 17; Case C-323/93 Centre d'Insémination de la Crespelle [1994] ECR I-5077, paragraph 18; and Case C-163/96 Raso and Others [1998] ECR I-533, paragraph 27).

[...]

105 The supplementary pension scheme at issue in the main proceedings fulfils an essential social function within the Netherlands pensions system by reason of the limited amount of the statutory pension, which is calculated on the basis of the minimum statutory wage.

106 Moreover, the importance of the social function attributed to supplementary pensions has recently been recognised by the Community legislature's adoption of Council Directive 98/49/EC of 29 June 1998 on safeguarding the supplementary pension rights of employed and self-employed persons moving within the Community (OJ 1998 L 209, p. 46).

[...]

108 If the exclusive right of the fund to manage the supplementary pension scheme for all workers in a given sector were removed, undertakings with young employees in good health engaged in non-dangerous activities would seek more advantageous insurance terms from private insurers. The progressive departure of `good' risks would leave the sectoral pension fund with responsibility for an increasing share of `bad' risks, thereby increasing the cost of pensions for workers, particularly those in small and medium-sized undertakings with older employees engaged in dangerous activities, to which the fund could no longer offer pensions at an acceptable cost.

109 Such a situation would arise particularly in a case where, as in the main proceedings, the supplementary pension scheme managed exclusively by the Fund displays a high level of solidarity resulting, in particular, from the fact that contributions do not reflect the risk, from the obligation to accept all workers without a prior medical examination, the continuing accrual of pension rights despite exemption from the payment of contributions in the event of incapacity for work, the discharge by the Fund of arrears of contributions due from an employer in the event of insolvency and the indexing of the amount of pensions in order to maintain their value.

110 Such constraints, which render the service provided by the Fund less competitive than a comparable service provided by insurance companies, go towards justifying the exclusive right of the Fund to manage the supplementary pension scheme.

111 It follows that the removal of the exclusive right conferred on the Fund might make it impossible for it to perform the tasks of general economic interest entrusted to it under economically acceptable conditions and threaten its financial equilibrium.

== See also ==
- European Union law
