= 1623 in art =

Events from the year 1623 in art.

== Events ==
- The Raphael Cartoons are bought from a Genoese collection by agents for the future King Charles I of England (at this time Prince of Wales).

== Works ==
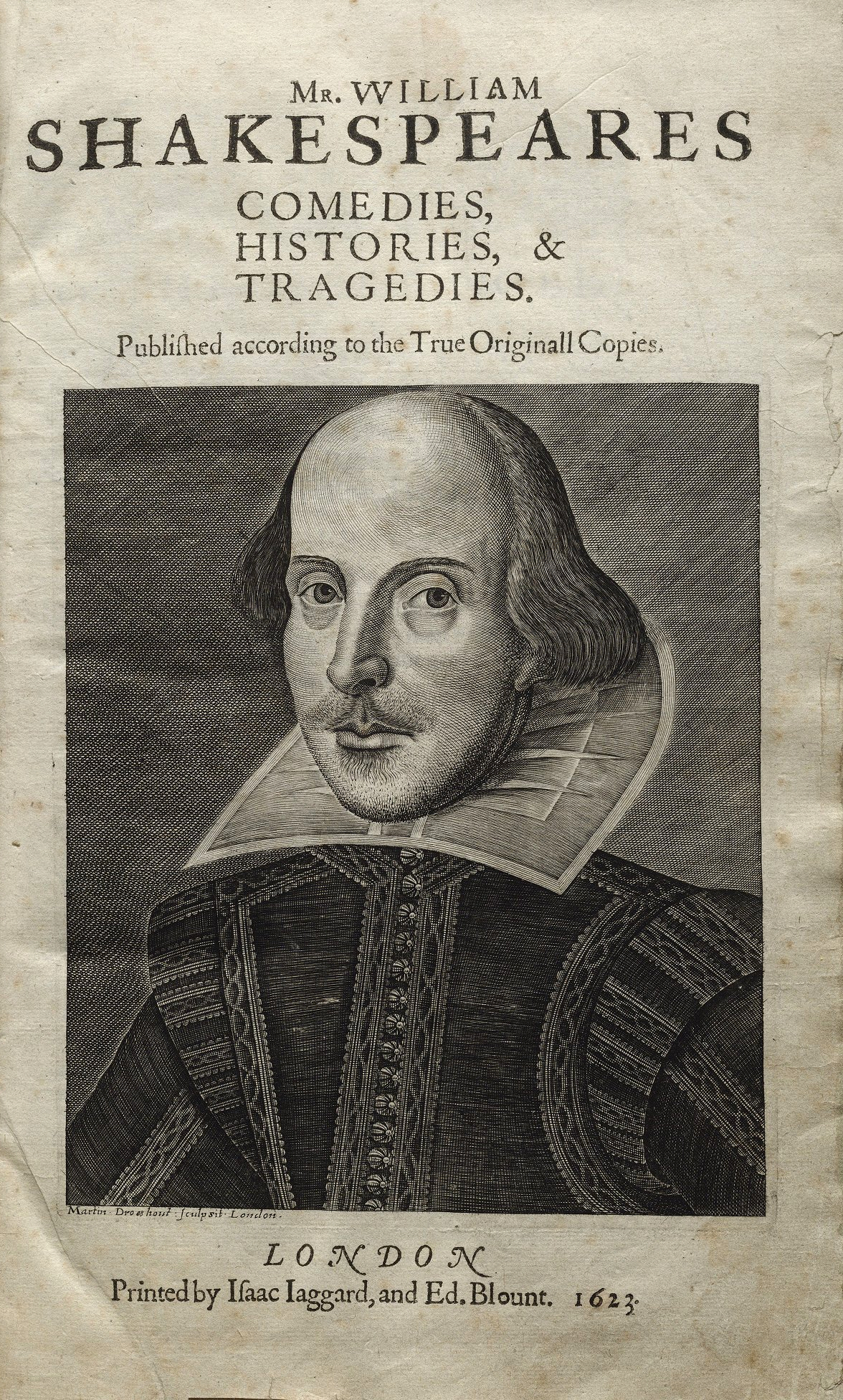
Droeshout – Portrait of Shakespeare from the 'First Folio'

- Gian Lorenzo Bernini – Self-portrait (approximate date)
- Martin Droeshout – Engraved portrait for the 'First Folio' of William Shakespeare's plays
- Orazio Gentileschi – The Annunciation (Sabauda Gallery)
- Guercino – The Burial of St. Petronilla
- Dirck Hals – Musicians
- Daniël Mijtens – James Hamilton, Earl of Arran (age 17)
- Peter Paul Rubens – Self-portrait (British Royal Collection, Windsor Castle)
- Dirck van Baburen (some dates approximate)
  - Cimon and Pero (Roman Charity)
  - Concert
  - Crowning With Thorns (2 versions)
  - Loose Company
  - Prometheus Being Chained by Vulcan
  - Saint Sebastian Tended by Irene
- Anthony van Dyck –
  - Portrait of the Lomellini family
  - Self Portrait (approximate date)
- Gerard van Honthorst
  - Merry Company
  - The Prodigal Son
  - The Steadfast Philosopher
- Diego Velázquez
  - Portrait of Philip IV in Armour
  - The Investiture Of St Ildefonso With The Chasuble

== Births ==
- May 30 - Wallerant Vaillant, Flemish Baroque painter and mezzotint engraver (died 1677)
- August 25 - Filippo Lauri, Italian painter, Principe (director) of the Accademia di San Luca (died 1694)
- date unknown
  - Jürgen Ovens, Danish or German Baroque painter and engraver (died 1678)
  - Francesco Barbieri, Italian Baroque painter (died 1698)
  - Giovanni Battista Caccioli Italian figure painter in quadratura (died 1675)
  - Francisco de Palacios, Spanish Baroque painter (died 1652)
  - Francesco di Maria, Italian painter active mainly in Naples (died 1690)
  - Pieter Janssens Elinga, Dutch painter (died 1682)
  - Giovanni Ghisolfi, Italian painter of veduta and capricci, mainly landscapes (died 1683)
  - Giacomo Lauri, Italian engraver (died 1694)
- probable
  - Thomas Simon, English medallist (died 1665)
  - Mei Qing, Chinese landscape painter, calligrapher and poet during the Qing dynasty (died 1697)
  - Reinier Nooms, Dutch marine painter and etcher (died c. 1664)

== Deaths ==
- January 11 - Pieter van Mierevelt, Dutch Golden Age painter (born 1596)
- December - Rodrigo de Villandrando, court painter during the reign of Philip III of Spain (born unknown)
- date unknown
  - Andrea Andreani, Italian wood engraver and early exponent of chiaroscuro (born 1540)
  - Francesco Brizio, Italian painter and engraver of the Bolognese School (born 1574)
  - Agostino Bugiardini, Italian sculptor (date of birth unknown)
  - Johann Theodor de Bry, Flemish painter and engraver (born 1561)
  - Domenico Fetti, Italian painter (born 1589)
  - Jacob van Musscher, Dutch Golden Age painter (born 1580)
