= Bugiardini =

Bugiardini is an Italian surname. Notable people with the surname include:

- Agostino Bugiardini (died 1623), Italian sculptor
- Giuliano Bugiardini (1475–1577), Italian painter and draughtsman
