= Arcangela Paladini =

Italian artist (1596–1622)

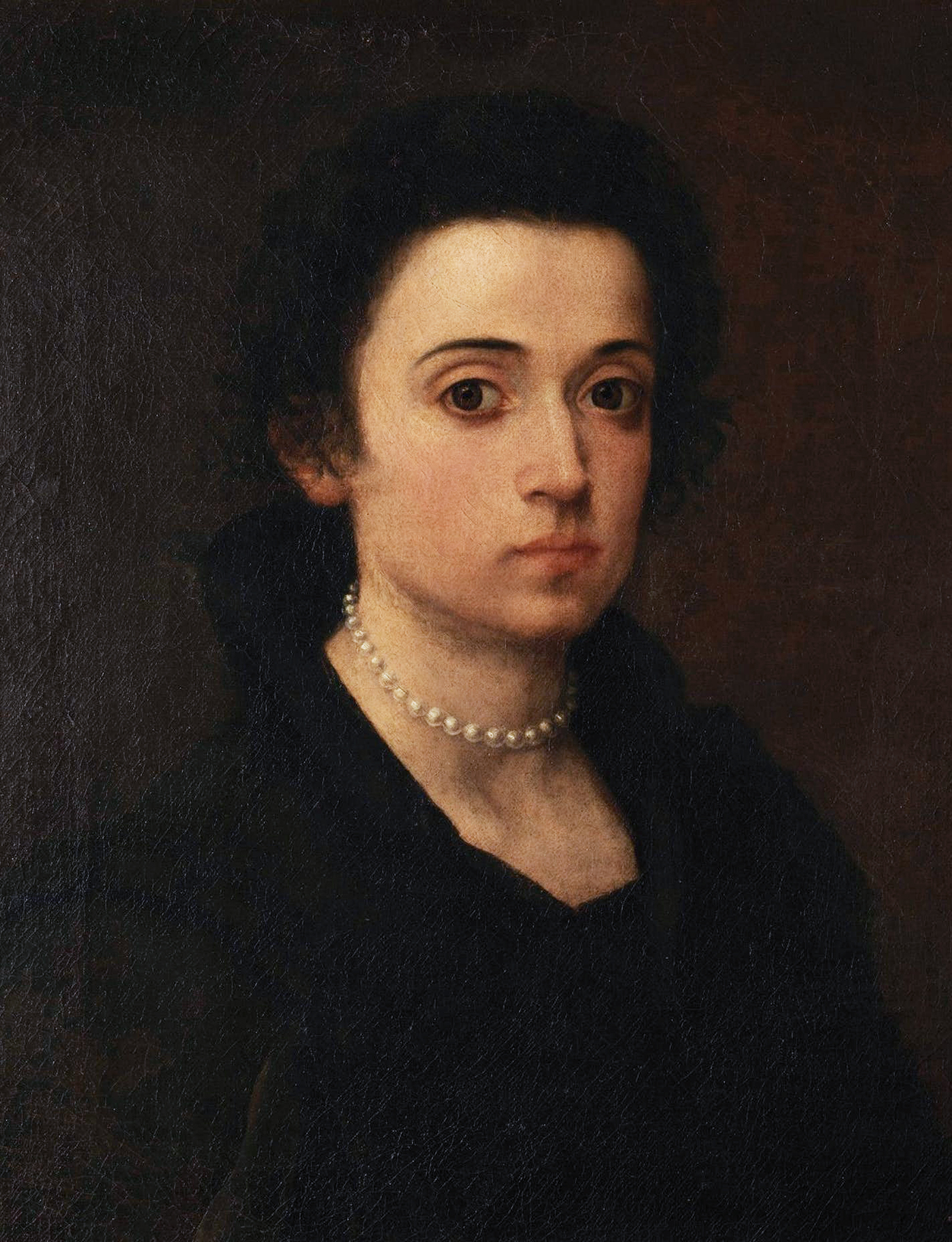
Self-portrait in the Uffizi

Arcangela Paladini (or Arcangiola Palladin; 1596 – 1622) was an Italian painter, singer, embroiderer, and poet.

== Early life and education ==
Arcangela Paladini was born in Pistoia. She was the daughter of Florentine painter Filippo Paladini (1544–1616), and a pupil of Alessandro Allori (1535-1607). Paladini was a contemporary of Baroque painter Artemisia Gentileschi (1593–1656). She may have served as the model for an image of Saint Cecilia, the patron saint of music, painted by Artemisia. Paladini was already an accomplished artist by the time she turned 15. While living in the Florentine monastery of Sant'Agatha between 1610-1616, she began working under acclaimed Mannerist painter Jacopo Ligozzi.

== Career ==
Paladini was proficient in many artistic areas, such as singing, writing poetry, and painting, as well as other areas. She was skilled in these areas by the age of 15. In addition to being a skilled painter, she also created embroidered works, such as portraits and images of flowers, foliage, and various types of wildlife. Although only one of her works has been identified, there are descriptions of her portraits of the Grand Duke Cosimo II in the Medici inventories, as well as evidence of Maria Maddelena's spreading of her work throughout the continent . The descriptions describe both pen-and-ink portraits and embroidered portraits of Cosimo II. In 1621, she was commissioned to create her self portrait that was to eventually be displayed in the Vasari Corridor.

== Relationship with the Medici Dynasty ==
She initially lived in the monastery of Saint Agatha, where she was supported by the Grand Duchess Maria Maddalena de' Medici, who later became her main benefactor. At age 17, at the suggestion of the Grand Duchess, Paladini married Antwerp-born tapestry-maker Jan Broomans. The Grand Duchess also invited Paladini to serve her at court, and introduced her to her husband Grand Duke Cosimo II. In 1621, Paladini painted a self-portrait for Maria Maddalena, who displayed the painting in her own room. The portrait was later added to the collection displayed in the Vasari Corridor and was restored in 1967. It is the only painting currently identified by the artist, though there are inventories of other works recorded.

== Death ==
Paladini died at the age of 23 (six years after her marriage) in Florence in 1622 and was buried in the church of Santa Felicità where the Grand Duchess commissioned a tomb memorial, a rare honor. The tomb was sculpted by Agostino Bugiardini and Antonio Novelli. The epitaph compares Paladini to the goddess Athena and the painter Apelles.
