= Margrit Waltz =

German-American aviator and ferry pilot

- Born: Margrit Budert Waltz
- Aviation career
- First flight: Cessna-150
- Famous flights: Transatlantic ferry flights
- Flight license: 1975

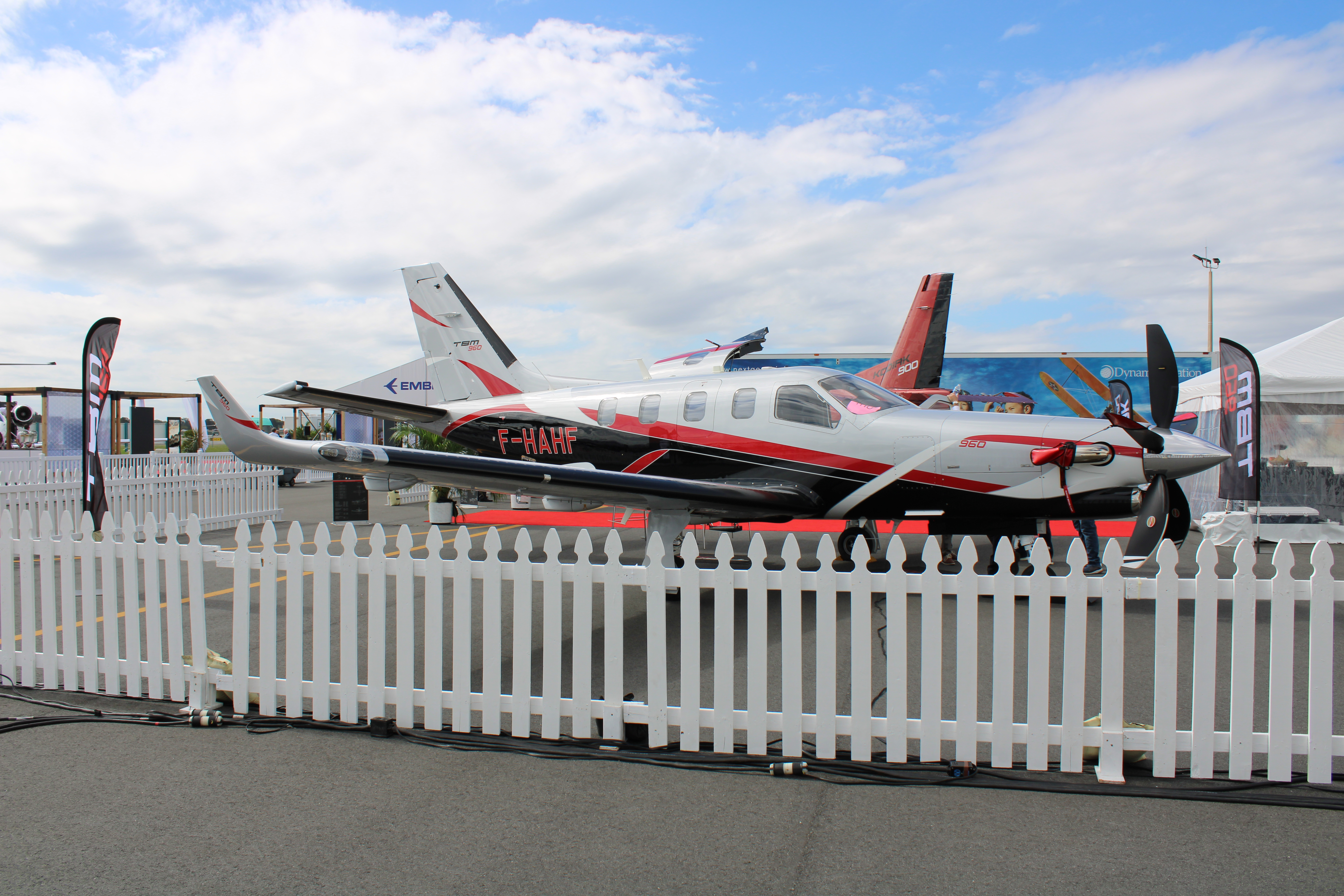
A TBM 960 aircraft, similar to the one flown by Waltz on her 960th ferry flight

Margrit Waltz (née Budert; born February 10, 1957) is a ferry pilot. As of April 2024, she had completed 960 ferry flights. The 960th flight was performed in a Daher TBM 960 single-engine turboprop, taking 15 hours and 38 minutes of flight time to deliver the plane from Tarbes, France to Pompano Beach, Florida. Stops were made in Wick, Scotland; Keflavík, Iceland; and Goose Bay, Canada.

According to a Daher-Socata press release, Waltz is "one of the world's most experienced ferry pilots". She has been delivering planes for Daher for 33 years, and has delivered over 300 Daher TBM aircraft from their manufacturing plant in Tarbes, France, to customers in North America. She has also made deliveries to Africa, Asia, and Australia.

== Early life ==
Margrit Budert was born in Germany in 1957. She grew up with an older brother. Her father was a World War II air force pilot. She went to an Ursulinen Internat, a Catholic boarding school near Bonn. The school was directly across the Rhine from Bonn-Hangelar Airport and she was able to watch the planes taking off and landing from the school windows. In a 2016 interview, she said that being at the boarding school under the supervision of the nuns to "the closest thing I could imagine to being in prison" compared to the "freedom" she was watching at the airport. Her interest in aviation was kindled when a friend took her for a flight in a Cessna 150.

Waltz learned to fly in 1975, at the age of 18. Her first flight instructor was Erich Hartmann; nicknamed "Bubi", he had 352 aerial kills, making him the highest-scoring ace of all time. Waltz described Hartmann as "a fantastic flight instructor". At the age of 19, she earned her own flight instructor certificate, becoming the youngest flight instructor in Germany. An early job was working for the European company Aero-Ferry. One of her assignments at Aero-Ferry was to deliver a Cessna Turbo 210, setting a world record for a non-stop flight from Goose Bay to Düsseldorf. The publicity from this flight brought her to the attention of the German broadcasting company WDR, which hired her as a "weather girl".

She met American David Waltz in 1980, at the Wilkes-Barre/Scranton airport. She moved in with him in 1983, and eventually married him; the couple have two daughters. When she accepted his marriage proposal, she told him that flying was her first love, and he would always be number two. Together they own Transaero International, which specializes in international ferry flights; David, also a pilot, handles trip preparation and other administrative tasks. Waltz now lives in Moscow, Lackawana County, Pennsylvania, where she has resided for most of her life.

== Flight experience ==
Waltz performed her first ferry mission in 1977. In 1991, she made her first flight in a TBM, when she and Daher test pilot Christian Briand flew TBM serial number 6 on a trans-atlantic delivery. As of 2022, she has logged over 25,000 flight hours. She has flown planes ranging from a Cessna 150 to a Citation Mustang jet. As of December 2003, she held 11 records for speed over a recognized course.

In 2002, Waltz made her 550th trans-atlantic ferry flight in a Lancair Columbia 300 named The New Spirit of St. Louis; the plane had previously been flown eastbound by Erik Lindbergh, Charles Lindbergh's grandson, following the original 1927 New York to Paris route his grandfather took. The original plan was to fly westbound directly to Wilkes-Barre from Germany, but she landed in Iceland due to strong winds, and then continued the trip from there. The 14 hour 42 minute flight was the first direct flight ever from Iceland to Wilkes-Barre. The only difficulty during the flight was flying through a thunderstorm after she had already reached the United States. At the time, she had flown more trans-Atlantic ferry flights than anybody else.
