= Teatro della Pergola =

Opera house in Florence, Italy

Coordinates: 43.773278°N 11.261082°E

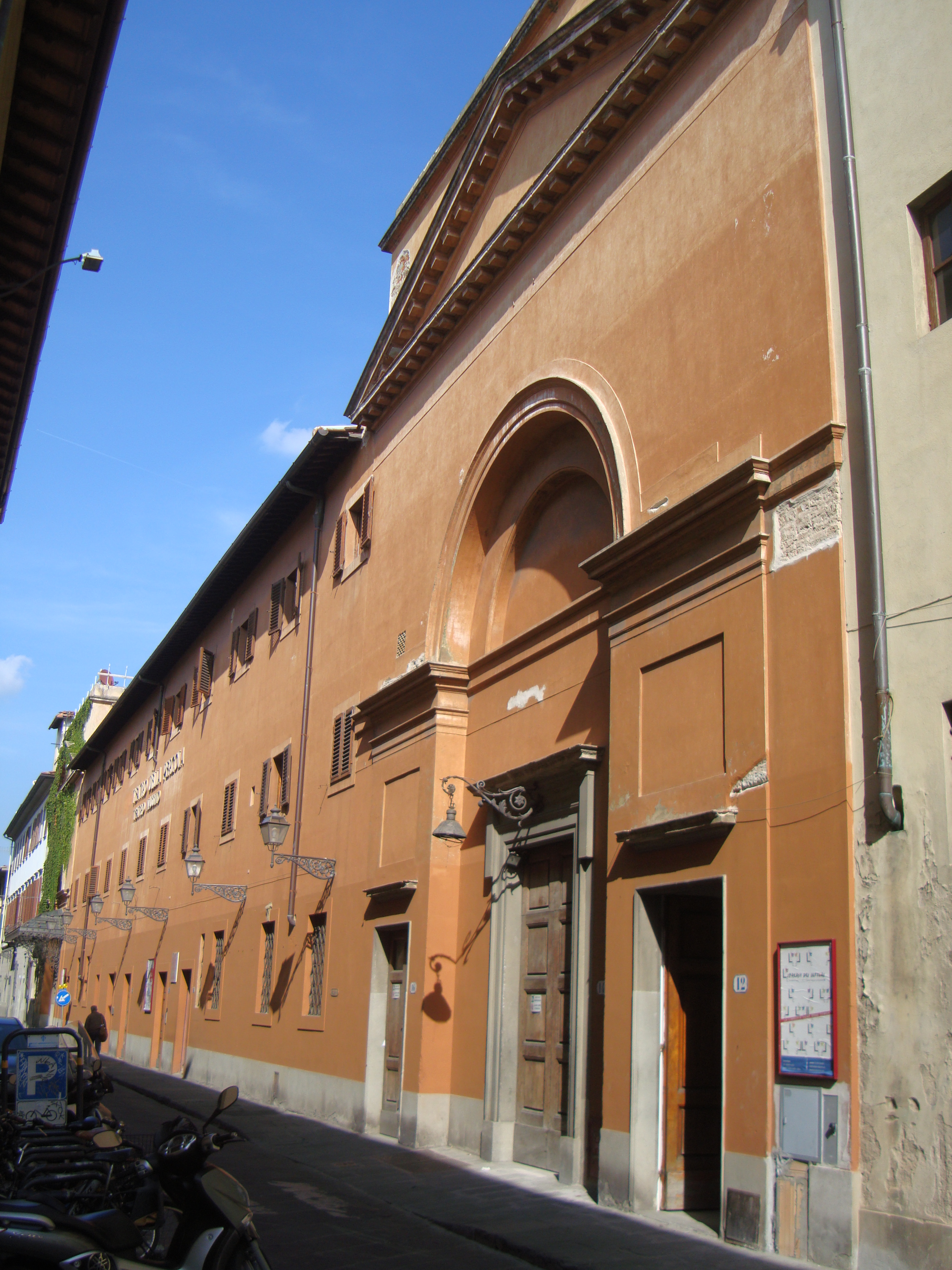
Exterior of the Teatro della Pergola

The Teatro della Pergola (Italian: [teˈaːtro della ˈpɛrɡola]), sometimes known as just La Pergola, is a historic opera house in Florence, Italy. It is located in the centre of the city on the Via della Pergola, from which the theatre takes its name. It was built in 1656 under the patronage of Cardinal Giancarlo de' Medici to designs by the architect Ferdinando Tacca, son of the sculptor Pietro Tacca; its inaugural production was the opera buffa, Il potestà di Colognole by Jacopo Melani. The opera house, the first to be built with superposed tiers of boxes rather than raked semi-circular seating in the Roman fashion, is considered to be the oldest in Italy, having occupied the same site for more than 350 years.

It has two auditoria, the Sala Grande, with 1,500 seats, and the Saloncino, a former ballroom located upstairs which has been used as a recital hall since 1804 and which seats 400.

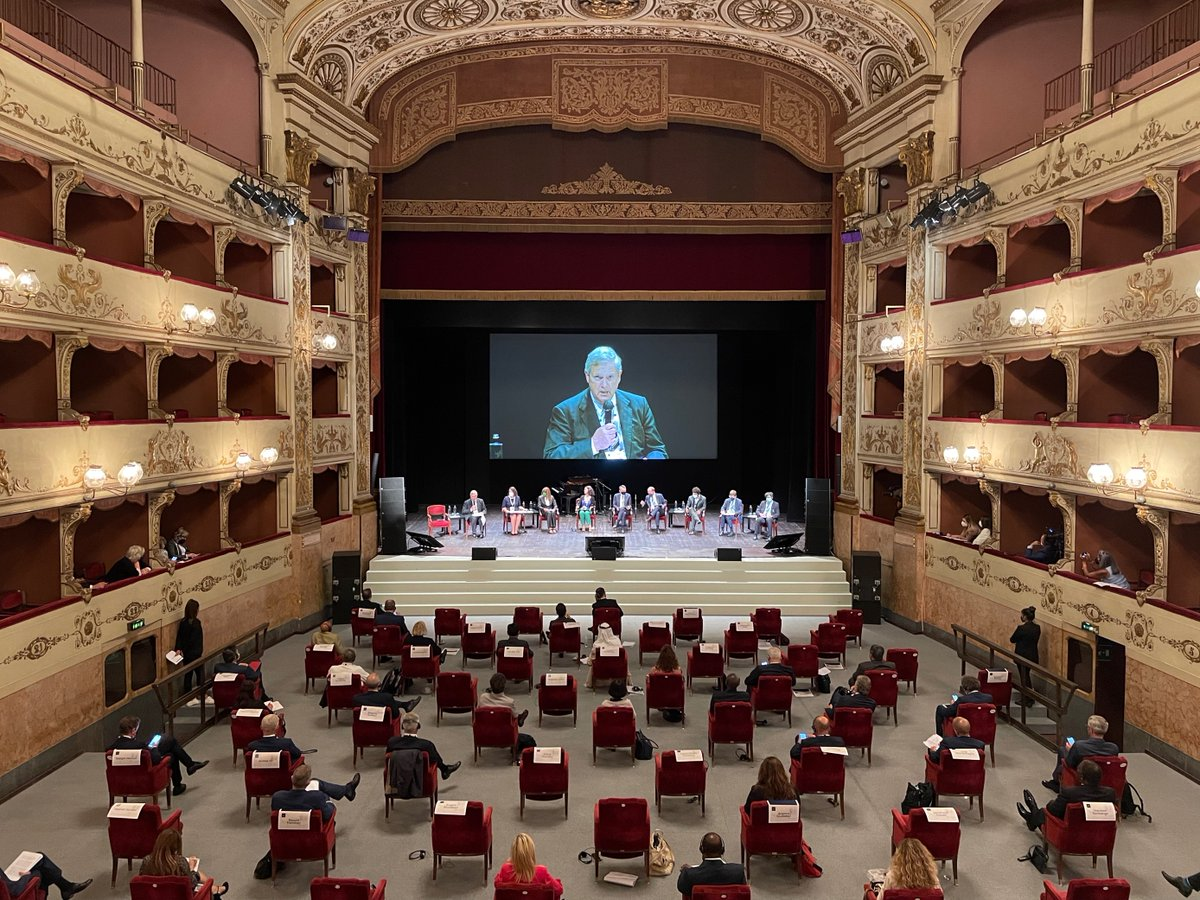
Interior of the Teatro della Pergola

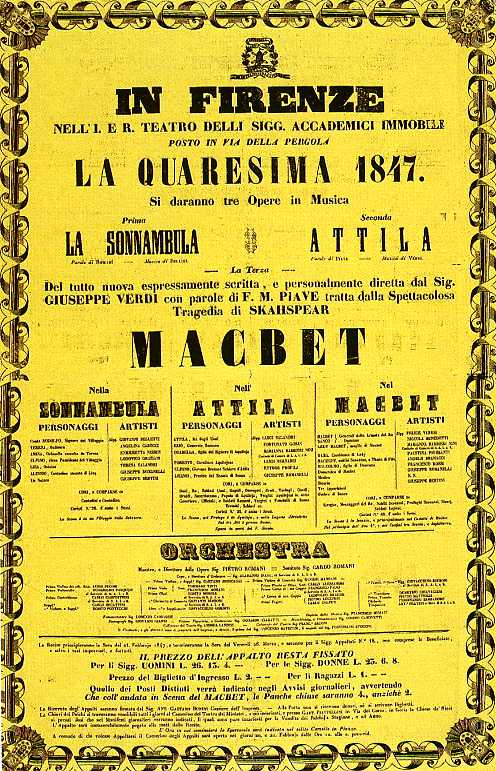
Poster for the premiere of Verdi's Macbeth

Work on completing the interior was finished in 1661, in time for the celebration of the wedding of the future grand duke Cosimo III de' Medici, with the court spectacle Ercole in Tebe by Giovanni Antonio Boretti. Primarily a court theatre used by the Grand Dukes of Tuscany, it was only after 1718 that it was opened to the public. In this theatre the great operas of Mozart were heard for the first time in Italy, and Donizetti's Parisina and Rosmonda d'Inghilterra, Verdi's Macbeth (1847), and Mascagni's I Rantzau were given their premiere productions.

By the nineteenth century, La Pergola was performing operas of the best-known composers of the day including Vincenzo Bellini, Gaetano Donizetti and Giuseppe Verdi. Verdi's Macbeth was given its premiere performance at La Pergola in 1847.

La Pergola's present appearance dates from an 1855–57 remodelling; it has the traditional horseshoe-shaped auditorium with three rings of boxes and topped with a gallery. It seats 1,000. It was declared a national monument in 1925 and has been restored at least twice since.

Today the theatre presents a broad range of about 250 drama performances each year, ranging from Molière to Neil Simon. Opera is only presented there during the annual Maggio Musicale Fiorentino.

Tommaso Sacchi is the Chairman of Fondazione Teatro della Toscana - Teatro della Pergola.

== Sources ==
- Lynn, Karyl Charna, Italian Opera Houses and Festivals, Lanham, Maryland: The Scarecrow Press, Inc., 2005. ISBN 0-8108-5359-0.
- Plantamura, Carol, The Opera Lover's Guide to Europe, New York: Citadel Press, 1996. ISBN 0-8065-1842-1.
