= Höfner and Elser v Macrotron GmbH =

- Court: European Court of Justice
- Full case name: Judgment of the Court (Sixth Chamber) of 23 April 1991. Klaus Höfner and Fritz Elser v Macrotron GmbH. Reference for a preliminary ruling: Oberlandesgericht München - Germany.
- Decided: 23 April 1991
- Citations: (1991) Case C-41/90, [1991] ECR I-1979

Keywords
- Undertaking, abuse, dominant position

Höfner and Elser v Macrotron GmbH (1991) C-41/90 was a significant EU competition law case, concerning the definition of an "undertaking" and abuse of a dominant position.

== Facts ==
The German Federal Office for Employment (Bundesanstalt) possessed a statutory monopoly on placing employees with employers. German law also allowed the Bundesanstalt after consulting with workers and employers associations to entrust other institutions or people with employment procurement services under its supervision. It had become the practice that a number of executive recruitment businesses developed, to which the Bundesanstalt turned a blind eye. However, without the explicit approval of the Bundesanstalt, acts, including contracts, which infringed the statutory provision were void under the German Civil Code.

Mr Höfner and Mr Elser were recruitment consultants who had placed a candidate as a sales director with a company called Macrotron GmbH. Macrotron GmbH had decided that they did not want the candidate. Mr Höfner and Mr Elser argued that the man was perfectly suitable, and sued for breach of contract. In its defence, Macrotron argued that any contract was void. Mr Höfner and Mr Elser therefore challenged the provision declaring the contract void under the EC competition law provision, Article 82.

== Judgment ==
As a preliminary question, the European Court of Justice held that the Bundesanstalt, even though it was a public body, could be subject to competition laws. It was an "undertaking", and therefore fell within the scope of the Treaty. Furthermore, by failing to satisfy demand for a good or service, the exclusive right of the German government to regulate employment services could amount to the abuse of a dominant position.

20 Having regard to the foregoing considerations, it is necessary to establish whether a public employment agency such as the Bundesanstalt may be regarded as an undertaking within the meaning of Articles 85 and 86 of the Treaty.

21 It must be observed, in the context of competition law, first that the concept of an undertaking encompasses every entity engaged in an economic activity, regardless of the legal status of the entity and the way in which it is financed and, secondly, that employment procurement is an economic activity.

22 The fact that employment procurement activities are normally entrusted to public agencies cannot affect the economic nature of such activities. Employment procurement has not always been, and is not necessarily, carried out by public entities. That finding applies in particular to executive recruitment.

23 It follows that an entity such as a public employment agency engaged in the business of employment procurement may be classified as an undertaking for the purpose of applying the Community competition rules.

24 It must be pointed out that a public employment agency which is entrusted, under the legislation of a Member State, with the operation of services of general economic interest, such as those envisaged in Article 3 of the AFG, remains subject to the competition rules pursuant to Article 90(2) of the Treaty unless and to the extent to which it is shown that their application is incompatible with the discharge of its duties (see judgment in Case 155/73 Sacchi [1974] ECR 409).

25 As regards the manner in which a public employment agency enjoying an exclusive right of employment procurement conducts itself in relation to executive recruitment undertaken by private recruitment consultancy companies, it must be stated that the application of Article 86 of the Treaty cannot obstruct the performance of the particular task assigned to that agency in so far as the latter is manifestly not in a position to satisfy demand in that area of the market and in fact allows its exclusive rights to be encroached on by those companies.

26 Whilst it is true that Article 86 concerns undertakings and may be applied within the limits laid down by Article 90(2) to public undertakings or undertakings vested with exclusive rights or specific rights, the fact nevertheless remains that the Treaty requires the Member States not to take or maintain in force measures which could destroy the effectiveness of that provision (see judgment in Case 13/77 Inno [1977] ECR 2115, paragraphs 31 and 32). Article 90(1) in fact provides that the Member States are not to enact or maintain in force, in the case of public undertakings and the undertakings to which they grant special or exclusive rights, any measure contrary to the rules contained in the Treaty, in particular those provided for in Articles 85 to 94.

27 Consequently, any measure adopted by a Member State which maintains in force a statutory provision that creates a situation in which a public employment agency cannot avoid infringing Article 86 is incompatible with the rules of the Treaty.

28 It must be remembered, first, that an undertaking vested with a legal monopoly may be regarded as occupying a dominant position within the meaning of Article 86 of the Treaty (see judgment in Case 311/84 CBEM [1985] 3261) and that the territory of a Member State, to which that monopoly extends, may constitute a substantial part of the common market (judgment in Case 322/81 Michelin [1983] ECR 3461, paragraph 28).

29 Secondly, the simple fact of creating a dominant position of that kind by granting an exclusive right within the meaning of Article 90(1) is not as such incompatible with Article 86 of the Treaty (see Case 311/84 CBEM, above, paragraph 17). A Member State is in breach of the prohibition contained in those two provisions only if the undertaking in question, merely by exercising the exclusive right granted to it, cannot avoid abusing its dominant position.

30 Pursuant to Article 86(b), such an abuse may in particular consist in limiting the provision of a service, to the prejudice of those seeking to avail themselves of it.

31 A Member State creates a situation in which the provision of a service is limited when the undertaking to which it grants an exclusive right extending to executive recruitment activities is manifestly not in a position to satisfy the demand prevailing on the market for activities of that kind and when the effective pursuit of such activities by private companies is rendered impossible by the maintenance in force of a statutory provision under which such activities are prohibited and non-observance of that prohibition renders the contracts concerned void.

32 It must be observed, thirdly, that the responsibility imposed on a Member State by virtue of Articles 86 and 90(1) of the Treaty is engaged only if the abusive conduct on the part of the agency concerned is liable to affect trade between Member States. That does not mean that the abusive conduct in question must actually have affected such trade. It is sufficient to establish that that conduct is capable of having such an effect (see Case 322/81 Michelin, above, paragraph 104).

33 A potential effect of that kind on trade between Member States arises in particular where executive recruitment by private companies may extend to the nationals or to the territory of other Member States.

34 In view of the foregoing considerations, it must be stated in reply to the fourth question that a public employment agency engaged in employment procurement activities is subject to the prohibition contained in Article 86 of the Treaty, so long as the application of that provision does not obstruct the performance of the particular task assigned to it. A Member State which has conferred an exclusive right to carry on that activity upon the public employment agency is in breach of Article 90(1) of the Treaty where it creates a situation in which that agency cannot avoid infringing Article 86 of the Treaty. That is the case, in particular, where the following conditions are satisfied:

- the exclusive right extends to executive recruitment activities;

- the public employment agency is manifestly incapable of satisfying demand prevailing on the market for such activities;

- the actual pursuit of those activities by private recruitment consultants is rendered impossible by the maintenance in force of a statutory provision under which such activities are prohibited and non-observance of that prohibition renders the contracts concerned void;

- the activities in question may extend to the nationals or to the territory of other Member States.

The interpretation of Article 59 of the EEC Treaty

35 In its third question, the national court seeks essentially to determine whether a recruitment consultancy company in a Member State may rely on Articles 7 and 59 of the Treaty regarding the procurement of nationals of that Member State for posts in undertakings in the same State.

36 It must be recalled, in the first place, that Article 59 of the EEC Treaty guarantees, as regards the freedom to provide services, the application of the principle laid down in Article 7 of that Treaty. It follows that where rules are compatible with Article 59 they are also compatible with Article 7 (judgment in Case 90/76 Van Ameyde [1977] ECR 1091, paragraph 27).

37 It must then be pointed out that the Court has consistently held that the provisions of the Treaty on freedom of movement cannot be applied to activities which are confined in all respects within a single Member State and that the question whether that is the case depends on findings of fact which are for the national court to make (see, in particular, the judgment in Case 52/79 Debauve ]1980] ECR 833, paragraph 9).

38 The facts, as established by the national court in its order for reference, show that in the present case the dispute is between German recruitment consultants and a German undertaking concerning the recruitment of a German national.

39 Such a situation displays no link with any of the situations envisaged by Community law. That finding cannot be invalidated by the fact that a contract concluded between the recruitment consultants and the undertaking concerned includes the theoretical possibility of seeking German candidates resident in other Member States or nationals of other Member States.

40 It must therefore be stated in reply to the third question that a recruitment consultant in a Member State may not rely on Articles 7 and 59 of the Treaty regarding the procurement of nationals of that Member State for posts in undertakings in the same State.

41 In view of the above answer, it is unnecessary to consider the first two questions and the part of the fourth question concerned with the question whether Article 59 of the Treaty precludes a statutory prohibition of the pursuit, by private recruitment consultancy companies in a Member State, of the business of executive recruitment.

== See also ==
- EC competition law
