= Article 102 of the Treaty on the Functioning of the European Union =

Clause of European Union competition law

Article 102 of the Treaty on the Functioning of the European Union (TFEU) (formerly Article 82 of the Treaty establishing the European Community) is a provision in the European Union competition law that prohibits abusive behaviours by a powerful business. The article applies to a business that holds a dominant position in a specific market, which is interpreted as the possession of a market power that allows a business to act independently of its competitors to some extent. A behaviour is considered an abuse if it weakens competition by excluding competitors from the market, or it imposes unfair conditions to the trading partners.

== Text of Article 102 ==
The text of Article 102 provides the following,

Any abuse by one or more undertakings of a dominant position within the internal market or in a substantial part of it shall be prohibited as incompatible with the internal market in so far as it may affect trade between Member States."

Such abuse may, in particular, consist in:

(a) directly or indirectly imposing unfair purchase or selling prices or other unfair trading conditions;
(b) limiting production, markets or technical development to the prejudice of consumers;
(c) applying dissimilar conditions to equivalent transactions with other trading parties, thereby placing them at a competitive disadvantage;
(d) making the conclusion of contracts subject to acceptance by the other parties of supplementary obligations which, by their nature or according to commercial usage, have no connection with the subject of such contracts.

== Application ==
The wording of the provision gives rise to several issues to consider in the application of Article 102; namely, the concept of 'one or more undertaking', 'Relevant market', 'Dominant position' and 'Effect on trade between member states'.

=== One or more undertaking ===
==== Undertaking ====
An entity must be an 'undertaking' to be subject to Community competition law and therefore Article 102. The European Court of Justice (ECJ) in Hofner v Elser states that "The concept of an undertaking encompasses every entity engaged in economic activity regardless of the legal status of the entity and the way in which it is financed". The European courts have ruled that Acts of, solidarity (such as the provision of public health care), public interest (such as the improvement of air navigation safety), and the protection of the environment are not economic in nature and therefore fall outside the application of European Community competition rules. Article 102 is not confined to actions of single undertakings as the inclusion of the phrase 'one or more undertaking' leads to the inclusion of collective dominance.

== Collective dominance ==
=== Definition ===
Collective dominance occurs when two or more businesses with some degree of connection influence the structure of a market through their conduct or through concerted strategic decisions.

=== Threshold ===
The necessary degree of connection or relationship between the entities that would be sufficient for a finding of collective dominance would depend on whether a broad or narrow interpretation is adopted. As illustrated through case law, businesses within the same corporate group, such as a business conglomerate, or within a single economic entity, such as a multi-national company with subsidiaries, can be regarded as having an adequate connection to establish the presence of collective dominance. This reflects a narrow interpretation of what would constitute collective dominance for the purpose of Article 102.

An alternative approach to establishing a relationship between two or more entities for the purposes of determining collective dominance could include a broad interpretation. This would encapsulate legally and economically independent firms within a specific market with some type of economic link such as an agreement or a licence.

In Almelo, the court explicitly stated that a relationship can be found between two or more entities by the presence of identical conduct on the market.

=== Establishing collective dominance ===
Dominance, be it by a single entity or collectively by a group of firms, is not illegal or prohibited in EU competition law or under Article 102 TFEU. However, abuse of a dominant position is prohibited and illegal because, dominant firms have a special responsibility to prevent their conduct distorting competition.

Consequently, where concerted strategic decisions or the conduct of two or more entities holding a dominant position within a specific market results in a negative impact on the market to the detriment of other businesses, this will trigger the application of Article 102.

Collective dominance, as demonstrated through case law, is often associated with an oligopoly although collective dominance could also arise in the context of or in relation to mergers. This association of collective dominance with oligopolies is confirmed in Airtours v Commission, which sets out an evidential and cumulative criterion that must be satisfied for collective dominance to be established.

- Firstly, each member of the collectively dominant group must have the capability of being aware of how fellow collectively dominant members are behaving. There must a significant level of transparency between the dominant firms so that members are precisely and quickly aware of developments or changes in the conduct of members.
- Secondly, tacit coordination must be sustained over a period of time. There must be a threat of potential retaliation for any deviation from the common conduct or policy by members of the group.
- Lastly, it must be proven that the potential reaction of consumers and competitors (present or future) of the dominant entities, will not affect the competition the dominant entities will encounter.

These three cumulative conditions for establishing collective dominance has been confirmed subsequently by the General court in the case of Laurent Piau v Commission. The above criterion has been established as being applicable in the context of abuse of dominance by a single entity. Nevertheless, statements by the court in Irish sugar indicates the court's acknowledgement that the criterion applicable for abuse of dominance by a single undertaking will apply in situations of collective dominance.

=== Defences ===
Not all collectively dominant conduct will violate Article 102 TFEU. As established and confirmed in several cases before EU courts and the commission, prima facie abusive conduct by dominant firms will be acceptable for one of three reasons:

1. Objective Justification
2. Efficiencies
3. Abuse in relation to proprietary rights

Defence	Requirement to invoke the defence
Objective justification	The conduct of a business participating in collective dominant practices will be justified, if it is shown that: i.     The conduct was objectively necessary (i.e. indispensable) ii.     The conduct produces significant benefits which outweigh any anti-competitive effects on the market iii.      The anti-competitive conduct is proportionate to the alleged goal being sought by the dominant firm Examples of objectively necessary conduct that might be sought by a dominant entity include protection for health and safety reasons, protection of the environment.
Efficiencies (i.e. Benefits)	A dominant firm seeking to rely on this defence will be expected to show that: i.    There is or is likely to be a benefit from the conduct. ii.    The conduct must be necessary with no alternatives that could produce less anti-competitive effects iii.     The benefits outweigh any anti-competitive effects iv. The conduct must not eliminate all competition
Abuse in relation to proprietary rights	This defence usually applies in the context of a dominant firm refusing access to its property or proprietary rights. This could involve access to intellectual property rights or access to physical property. A dominant firm can rely on this defence if it can show that: i. The restrictions are necessary to protect competition.[21]

In practice, neither the Commission nor the Court have ever accepted such a defense.

=== Burden of proof ===
As asserted in Microsoft v Commission the burden of proof rests on the defendants/alleged firm(s) to provide objective justification – which cannot be vague or theoretical arguments – to disprove a claim of collective dominance brought before the court. Where such a justification is raised, it rests on the commission to disprove the arguments and evidence relied on by the dominant firms.

=== Consequences of breach ===
If it is established that there is an abuse of a dominant position by an entity, the commission has the authority and discretion to impose behavioural and structural remedies against collectively dominant firms.

Behavioural remedies include:

1. Requesting that the dominant firm(s) cease their abusive conduct and may involve requiring the adoption of positive action by the dominant firms.
2. Imposing a fine on the collectively dominant entities involved in the abusive behaviour.

Structural remedies include:

1. Divesting a business of its assets.
2. Mandating the fragmentation of a business.

== Relevant market ==
Defining the relevant market is a vital precondition to assessing dominance. Market definition can be used to establish the boundaries of competition between undertakings, with the purpose of identifying the competitive constraints faced by the firms.

The commission measures these competitive constrains in both the Market and Geographical dimension. With the relevant market within which to assess competition being a combination of both approaches. With the competitive constraints assessed via demand substitution, supply substitution and potential competition.

=== The product market ===
The Commission defines the relative product market as, a market that comprises all "products and/or services which are regarded as interchangeable or substitutable by the consumer, by reason of the products' characteristics, their prices and their intended use".

Two common tests used to assess the interchangeability of product market are:

- The 'hypothetical monopolist' test which is whether a small but significant increase in price is likely be allowed by the hypothetical monopolist company to profit from this. If consumers can and would move away from the hypothetical monopolist's product and onto other products then their market is more widely defined.
- The 'intuitive approach', which focuses on brand loyalty and the use of the products

=== The geographical market ===
The Commission defines Geographical market as a "market comprises the area in which the undertakings concerned are involved in the supply and demand of products or services, in which the conditions of competition are sufficiently homogeneous and which can be distinguished from neighbouring areas because the conditions of competition are appreciably different in those area."

=== Cellophane fallacy ===
The existence of the cellophane fallacy implies that market definition in Article 102 cases needs to be particularly carefully considered and that any single method of market definition, including in particular the SSNIP-test, is likely to be inadequate. It is necessary to rely on a variety of methods for checking the robustness of possible alternative market definitions.

=== Dominance ===
A finding of dominance requires a two-stage process. First, consideration must be had to the relevant market to which the undertaking operates upon: both the relevant product market and the relevant geographic market. Second, one the market has been established, the Commission must decipher whether the undertaking enjoys a dominant position upon the given market. A finding of dominance derives from a combination of several factors, Paragraph 12 of the commission's guidance highlights three factors that the commission will consider:

"(1) constraints imposed by the existing suppliers from, and the position on the market of, actual competitors.

(2) constraints imposed by the credible threat of future expansion by actual competitors or entry by potential competitors."

(3) constraints imposed by the bargaining strength of the undertakings customers."

==== Actual competitors ====
Paragraph 13 of the commission's guidance states that an undertaking's market share demonstrates a 'first indication' as to the position of current competitors.

Clarification arises within Paragraph 14 and 15 of the commission's guidance that generally low market shares demonstrate a good proxy of the absence of substantial power, (i.e.: dominance). Whilst the higher the market share and the longer the period of time over which it is held, the more likely the undertaking has substantial market power and as such is dominant.

The table demonstrates the approach that the Commission have adopted in its jurisprudence, when deciding an undertaking's dominance.

Jurisprudence of European courts
Market share %	Observations
100%	Richard Whish acknowledges that a 100% market share is 'rare' however it remains possible, as demonstrated in GVL OJ. 100% market shares often arise where there is only one operator on the market for the distribution of the product: referred to by the courts as de facto monopolies. Further evidence of de facto monopolies can be seen in Amministrazione Autonoma dei Monopoli di Stato, Telefónica SA v Commission and Motorola - Enforcement of GRPS standard essential patents.
85-90%	High market shares are usually conclusive of market dominance. This recognition from the commission is shown in the recent decisions of Tetra Pak Rausing SA v Commission with a 91% market share, BPP Industries Plc and British Gypsum Ltd v Commission with a 96% share and Microsoft Corp. v Commission and Google v Commission both being held to have market shares exceeding 90%.
75%	Indicative of dominance.
50%	A 50% market share provides strong evidence of dominance. At 50% the AKZO presumption of dominance is enforced whereby the commission will presume dominance. Whilst the presumption is argued to be limited, its effect has been confirmed in recent case law: France Télécom v Commission, Solvay v Commission, AstraZeneca AB v Commission.
40% or more	Evidence of dominance. Considered with other factors
25-40%	Single dominance is unlikely unless there is a fragmented market and significant other factors. However, recent case law demonstrates that a finding of dominance remains possible: in Virgin/British Airways a market share of 39.7% amounted to dominance.
20%	Possibility of dominance left open. Considered with other factors
10%	Too Small

Whilst important, Richard Whish acknowledges that, the market share figures are, 'simply a proxy for market power, and cannot be determinative in themselves'. Following Paragraph 12 of the commission's guidance, potential competitors and countervailing buying power must also be considered.

==== Potential competitors ====
Paragraph 16 of the commission's guidance emphasises that the commission will consider the potential impact of entry by new customers onto the market as well as the expansion of existing competitors. In doing so, the Commission must consider whether the entry to the market, or expansion within the market, (or threat to), is 'likely, timely and sufficient' for the undertaking to change its behaviour.

Paragraphs 16 and 17 of the commission's guidance gives clarification on how the criteria are to be applied^{.}

To be 'likely', the Commission must look at how possible it is that the expansion, or entry into the market, will occur. The Commission must consider barriers to the market: where there are barriers in place, it is difficult for a new entity to enter the market. Types of barriers that the Commission may consider are listed in Paragraph 17. Richard Whish summaries these as "legal barriers, economic advantages enjoyed by the dominant undertaking, costs and network effects that impede customers from switching from one supplier to another and the dominant firm's own conduct and performance".

To be 'timely', the entry or expansion must be 'sufficiently swift' to act as a deterrence upon the undertaking from exercising dominance.

To be 'sufficient', the entry or expansion must have a significant impact to which it would deter the undertaking from exercising its dominance. The entry or expansion cannot be based on a small scale to which its impact would be limited.

==== Countervailing buyer power ====
Paragraph 18 of the commission's guidance acknowledges that customers, as well as competitors, have the power to constrain competition. In doing so, the Commission must look at the 'sufficient bargaining strength of the customer': Paragraph 18 sets out features that may be discussed to decipher a customer's bargaining power:

"the customers size or their commercial significance for the dominant undertaking and their ability to switch quickly to competing suppliers, to promote new entry or to vertically integrate, and to credibly threaten to do so."

In application, Richard Whish acknowledges that it is "more likely that large and sophisticated customers will have this kind of countervailing buyer power than smaller firms in a fragmented industry".

The commission's guidance goes on to clarify, in Paragraph 18, that the countervailing buyer power will not be considered a sufficient restraint where only a particular, or limited, number of customers are shielded from the market share exercised by the dominant undertaking.

Motorola:

The case considered the significance of countervailing buyer power. Motorola presented the argument that it was not a dominant undertaking due to the countervailing buyer power of Apple. Whilst the Commission recognised the need to consider customer's buying power, the commission, in finding Motorola to be dominant reinforced the guidance that whilst a customer may have significant buying power, this may not protect all of the undertaking's customers.

===== Summary =====
Following Paragraph 13 of the commission's guidance, where the three conditions are satisfied, it is likely, the commission will find the undertaking to be dominant. Paragraph 1 of the commission's guidance reinforces that whilst dominance in itself is not illegal, once dominant, the undertaking adopts"a special responsibility not to allow its conduct to impair competition on the common market".

==== Commissions enforcement priorities ====
The way in which the commission in the EU deals with cases of dominance is vastly different to that of their US counterparts. The EU commission take a very active stance on the prevention of the abuse of dominance, whereas the US Government take a much more 'Laissez-Faire' approach and leave the markets to their own devices unless they need to step in to sort out problems. Outlined in the Guidance of enforcement priorities for Article 102 of the TFEU. The EU commission takes all sufficient factors into account when trying to enforce Article 102, and they can conclude whether or not to put their time into a case taken to them by the effected parties. The German concept of ordoliberablism is put to effect by the EU commission by them using all their powers to aide the market into running as efficiently as it possibly can. This concept of commission intervention is not used in the United States, and by the EU using it this shows how the two differ in their ideologies and concepts. Generally, price based exclusionary conduct is seen as beneficial to the consumer, as they will get lower prices for goods and services when firms compete to be the cheapest. However, when the price strategies of a firm may be seen to be hampering competition from competitors which are as efficient as the dominant undertaking, then the government would step in to change this. Other types of undertakings such as exclusive dealing or predatory pricing will be intervened upon much sooner than competitive pricing as they are more serious and can cause a much higher risk to consumers in the market.

==== Summary ====
Using the Guidance on Enforcement priorities for Article 102, it outlines the many different types of ways that a ruling body should step in to stop a myriad of strategies that firms use to abuse a position of dominance. The commission is unable to bind the European courts when applying the law, The two step case is used as shown in Paragraph 9 to aide the government in penalising firms that abuse their position of dominance. There are some commenters that have suggested that the guidelines should be removed as all cases are individual and require a full observation of the scenario before a decision has been made. However, using Advocate General Mazak's opinion in TeliaSonera, the commissions guidance may be used as a 'useful point of reference', without having the ability to bind the courts to a decision.

=== Effect on trade between member states ===
The court of justice ruled in Commercial solvents that the requirement of an appreciable effect on trade between member states would be satisfied where conduct brought about an altercation in the structure of competition in the internal market.

The commission provides further guidelines on the effect of trade concept contained in Articles 101 and 102 TFEU, detailing the general principles, the concept of trade between member states. The notion of May effect and the concept of appreciability.

== Abuse of dominance ==
=== Definition for abuse of dominance ===
The definition for abuse of dominance hinges from Article 102 (ex Article 82). Abuse alone isn't caught by Article 102, but abuse of a dominant position by an undertaking would be caught under Article 102. It is imperative that without dominance, the abuse wouldn't breach Article 102. An undertaking that isn't dominant the abuse wouldn't be caught but, the dominant undertaking that exhibits abusive behavior would be caught under Article 102 as they are given a special attribute than compared to a non-dominant undertaking. Thus it is conclusive that without dominance that the abuse wouldn't breach Article 102 as the undertakings is using that dominance to commit that abuse

Hoffman-La Roche v Commission is considered a crucial case as it doesn't specify the abuses such as exploitative, exclusionary and single market abuse that would be committed by undertakings, but rather a concept that amounts to an abuse of dominance. Decisions such as Deutsche Telekom AG v Commission gave similar language that the undertaking must be "competing on its merits". Normal competition is identified as an undertaking competing on its merits such as lowering prices and/or innovation. Abuse of a dominant undertaking can be identified by not competing on its merits such as predatory pricing, thus would be identified as abnormal competition behavior.

There are three forms of abuse that could occur from anti-competitive practices; exclusionary, exploitative and single market abuse. Under Article 102, exclusionary and exploitative abuses may be considered separately, this does not mean there is a rigid category that abuse falls into. Whish and Bailey point out, that "the same behaviour may exhibit both characteristics". An overlap of abuse of dominance is a common occurrence, Richard Whish suggests that a dominant firm that refuses to supply may have an exploitative and/or an exclusionary one too. In the case of Continental Can v Commission, the Court of Appeal confirmed that Article 102 can be applied to both forms of abuse. Although overlaps may occur and as established there are no rigid categories, the commission's Guidance on Article 102 Enforcement Priorities recognised a distinction between the two.

==== Per se illegality ====
A more formalistic approach used by the EU courts to assess abuse was known as per se illegality. This approach was normally used on rebate systems or loyalty discounts even though it is a benefit to consumer welfare by lowering prices. However, a dominant undertaking practicing this system to lower prices to extremes such as predatory pricing would be considered anti-competitive behavior. The EU faced an Ordoliberalism criticism about the per se approach from the US in Microsoft v Commission, accusing the EU that they protect competitors rather than the competitive process as their too interventionist. There is a distinction in both policies, the United States Sherman act is fearful of false positives whereas the EU is fearful of false negatives adding further criticism, towards the interventionist approach. However this intervening approach is able to identify the expanding market which would amount to abuse because of the dynamic market structure, with interaction between producers and consumers from different levels of supply as the choice of the consumer is restricted and wouldn't benefit the consumer. Furthermore, the decision in TeliaSonera the court of justice emphasized that Article 102 doesn't only protect competitive process but also protect competitors that are just as efficient in the market. The undertaking is able to justify the rebate system if it is objectively justified under defenses such as economic efficiency. But the negative effects from this practice must produce less than the positive effects from the rebate system to benefit consumer welfare.

==== Effects-based approach ====
The EU shifted in approach to an effects based approach to assess abuse thus recognizing deviation from the per se approach, this is seen in the case of Intel v Commission. An effects-based procedure takes into account for a detailed assessment of an economic nature to show reasonable grounds that the dominant undertaking abuse has foreclosure effects on competition. It primarily focuses on the competitive practices used by a dominant undertaking, to which the competitive authority will identify the effects produced from such practice. It will provide factual evidence to the extent of the anti-competitive behavior when it is compared to the competitive effects to that practice. In itself provides a rule of reason approach when assessing abuse. Thus, the detailed assessment will show the economic impact of the undertaking practice to avoid false positives and to provide an effective interventionist approach. This not only shows the likely economic impact that abuse will have to consumer welfare but it eliminates the criticism of needing a detailed assessment for the abuse committed. It also clears the distinction between protecting the competitors rather than the competitive process, as the goal for competition law is to protect the integrity of the single market, thus the competitive process is examined to protect consumer welfare.

An effects-based analysis takes into account of both consequential and deontological thinking into their assessment. Consequential thinking implies an undertaking to be deemed abusive if the behavior outweighs the consumer welfare benefit. The undertaking could justify their behavior if the pro-competitive effects outweigh the anti-competitive effects. Furthermore, consequential thinking promotes total welfare rather than consumer welfare. This shows that the effects felt by consumers are not classed collectively but based on preferences and these preferences are subject to change or bias. Deontological thinking looks at the competition process rather than the result of that abuse. However, this approach protects the competitive process regardless of the outcome to the actual effects to consumer welfare. However deontological thinking implies a critical thinking in this which is categorical thinking.

The European Union can objectively justify with an economic based analysis applying both consequential and deontological approaches. Collectively the European Union can practice both of these approaches to the suitable context of the case whilst both of these approaches when combined are able to avoid each other disadvantages. The single market is always dynamic thus the EU would need to accommodate to this dynamic market as there isn't a single value to assess abuse of dominant undertakings. The assessment performed by the European Union takes into account factual evidence along with an economic assessment showing an analysis of deontological whilst using the categorical thinking to be able to show the likely consumer harm inflicted to the single market and ultimately consumer welfare.

=== Exclusionary abuse ===
The definition of exclusionary abuse is characterised as "conduct engaged in, by a dominant undertaking which is capable of preventing competitors … from profitability entering or remaining active in a given market", meaning that it will have an indirect effect on consumers. The conduct will either 'competes on the downstream market and is acting to foreclose that market to its own advantage' or 'distorts competition on the upstream market between itself and its competitors by introducing exclusive purchasing obligation.

==== Limiting production ====
Under Article 102(b), "limiting production, markets or technical development to the prejudice of consumers" is considered an abuse by a dominant undertaking. An example was found in Porto di Genova [1991], where a shipping port refused to raise expenditure and update technology. This limited the amount of cargo that the port could deal with to the detriment of some of its users.

==== Price discrimination ====
Price discrimination falls under Article 102(c), whereby an abuse is "applying dissimilar conditions to equivalent transactions with other trading parties, thereby placing them at a competitive disadvantage". An example of this could be offering rebates to industrial customers who export your company's sugar, but not to Irish customers who are selling their goods in the same market as you are in. Investopedia provides that price discrimination charges customers different prices for the same product or service, for example where consumers buy airline tickets several months in advance in comparison to those buying last minute. In United Brands v Commission, the Court of Justice recognised that a dominant firm may charge different prices to reflect the competitive market.

==== Tying ====
Under Article 102(d) "tying" is defined as "making the conclusion of contracts subject to acceptance by the other parties of supplementary obligations which, by their nature or according to commercial usage, have no connection with the subject of such contracts." Tying one product into the sale of another can be considered abuse too, being restrictive of consumer choice and depriving competitors of outlets. This was the alleged case in Microsoft v. Commission leading to an eventual fine of €497 million for including its Windows Media Player with the Microsoft Windows platform. A refusal to supply a facility which is essential for all businesses attempting to compete to use can constitute an abuse. One example was in a case involving a medical company named Commercial Solvents. When it set up its own rival in the tuberculosis drugs market, Commercial Solvents was forced to continue supplying a company named Zoja with the raw materials for the drug. Zoja was the only market competitor, so without the court forcing supply, all competition would have been eliminated.

==== Bundling ====
Bundling and tying are very similar, Whish indicates that bundling arises in a situation where two products are sold together in a single package at a single price. Bundling differs from tying merely because it lacks the element of compulsion. Issues of bundling have emerged in a series of complaints in Streetmap EU Ltd v Google Inc & Ors. Streetmap involved the interaction of competition between online search engines and competition between suppliers of online mapping services. The Court concluded that the creation of 'OneBox' did not have an appreciable effect on Streetmap's ability to compete. However, in a more recent decision, in 2018 the Commission fined Google €4.34 billion for illegal practices regarding Android mobile devices to strengthen dominance of Google's search engine. In 2019 Google was fined a third time by the European Commission for abusing its market dominance by restricting third-party rivals from displaying search advertisements.

==== Predatory pricing ====
Predatory pricing is a controversial category. This is the practice of dropping prices of a product below costs so that one's smaller competitors cannot cover their costs and leave the market. The Chicago School holds predatory pricing to be impossible, because if it were then banks would lend money to finance it. However, in France Telecom SA v Commission a broadband internet company was forced to pay €10.35 Million for dropping its prices below its own production costs. It had "no interest in applying such prices except that of eliminating competitors" and was being subsidised to capture the bigger share of a booming market. In contrast to France Telecom, Tetra Pak International SA illustrates an extension of European creativity in finding that Tetra Pak had abused its dominant position even though it was dominant in one market but not dominant in the market in which the abuse took place. The Court of Justice held that the abusive behaviour was intended to benefit Tetra Pak's position in the market. This was based on the mere fact that there were 'very close associative links' between the two markets in which Tetra Pak operated.

==== Margin squeeze ====
Margin squeeze was considered in the case of KonKurrensverket v TeliaSonera Sverige, where the Court of Justice established that it exists in its own independent right. Advocate General Mazak considered that the abusive nature derived from the unfair nature of the spread between the dominant undertaking's prices for wholesale access and its retail prices and the fact that the undertaking's wholesale products are indispensable to competition on the downstream market. This is similar to Slovak Telecom v Commission, by where the Commission found that the undertaking formed by Slovak Telekom and Deutsche Telekom had committed a single and continuous infringement concerning broadband services in Slovakia between 12 August 2005 and 31 December 2010.

==== Rebates ====
Article 102 does not state that offering rebates to customers is abuse, however in the case of Intel v Commission it may occur. The Commission found that Intel acted unlawfully by granting rebates to four computer manufacturers (Dell, Lenovo, HP, and NEC) on condition that they purchased from Intel. In its decision it fined Intel €1.06 billion for abuse of dominance through exclusivity rebates. This also illustrated the Courts recognition for an effects based approach despite the relatively recent cases of Solvay and ICI, where the Court has seemed reluctant to move away from a formalistic approach.

==== Exclusive dealing agreements ====
An agreement whereby a customer is required to purchase all or most of a particular type of goods or services from a dominant supplier and is prevented from buying from any supplier other than the dominant firm. In Hoffmann the Court of Justice held that it may be abusive for a dominant firm to require a customer to buy 'most of its requirements' from that firm. The case of Soda-ash, the Commission fined Solvay €20 million and ICI €10 million for requiring customers to enter into long-term indefinite requirements contracts.

==== Refusal to supply ====
Refusal to supply is where a dominant firm decides to not supply goods or services to another firm. The categorisation of refusal to supply cases as a form of 'abuse' has been quite controversial. Some would argue that it is the prerogative of a firm who it decides to supply its goods and services to and that punishing the firm for not supplying a different firm or forcing the dominant firm to sell their products against their will, is wrong. Francis Jacobs, an Advocate General in the Court of Justice, acknowledged this, stating that 'the right to choose one's trading partners and freely to dispose of one's property are generally recognised principles in the laws of the Member States' and that if these rights were to be infringed it would 'require careful justification'. It has also been argued that the act of forcing the dominant firm to supply its products to others may not produce pro-competitive effects if 'free-riders' are able to take advantage of investments that have been made by other firms on the market. This has also been acknowledged by Advocate General Jacobs and the European Commission.

Irrespective of these controversies, the law does, in certain circumstances, impose a duty on dominant firms not to refuse to supply their products and can impose an obligation on the firm to supply the products. Case law has developed a substantial test to determine when refusing to supply a downstream customer by an upstream firm amounts to an abuse of the dominant (upstream) firm's position.

The first issue to consider is whether there is a refusal to supply. An outright refusal to supply the product will satisfy this, as will what the commission has termed 'constructive refusal'. One example of this would be offering to supply the product only on 'unreasonable terms'; another would be unduly delaying the supply of the product.

The second is whether the accused undertaking has a dominant position in the upstream market. Upstream market means the suppliers and producers of the products and raw materials; the downstream market tends to be the consumer/customer-facing businesses. The Court of Justice has said that the dominant firm does not even need to actually operate on the upstream market – it could be sufficient that there is a potential, or even hypothetical, market. This can be a solution to the problem that the market may not actually exist due to the dominant firm refusing to supply the goods or services.

The third issue to consider is whether the access which is sought from the dominant firm is indispensable to the firm that is wishing to compete on the downstream market. An example of this can be seen in Oscar Bronner. The Court held that a home-delivery system for a daily newspaper market was not indispensable as there were other methods for delivering daily newspapers and there were no technical, legal, or economic obstacles that made it impossible for other daily newspapers to create their own system. The Magill case shows when access will be indispensable – without the information that access was requested for in Magill, the magazine they wished to publish could not have been published at all. Further, there were no objective justifications for refusing to supply the product and the refusal would have eliminated all competition in the secondary market. The access will be indispensable if duplication of the product or services to which access is sought is:

- physically impossible (for example, there is only one point on a coastline where a deep-sea port could be built and access is sought to this port's facilities);
- legally impossible (for example, where the product is protected by intellectual property rights); or
- not economically viable (for example, if the market is not sufficiently large enough to sustain a second facility that would compete with the dominant firm's).

The fourth issue is whether the refusal would lead to an elimination of effective competition in the downstream market. The Court of Justice confirmed that it is not necessary to demonstrate that 'all' competition was eliminated; instead, it just has to be established that 'all effective' competition would be eliminated.

The final issue is whether the dominant firm has an objective justification for refusing to supply the product or service. If they do, then the refusal will not be unlawful. Such an objective justification must pursue a legitimate interest other than the dominant firm's own commercial interests. Examples of objective justifications include that the customer would use the product for an illegal purpose or that granting access could negatively impact the incentive of the dominant firm and downstream competitors to innovate.

The Guidance is only concerned with refusals to supply which risk vertical foreclosure. However, refusals to supply can also be a concern with respect to horizontal foreclosure, although this is rare. An example of this would be disciplinary measures against a distributor who handles competitors' products.

==== Refusal to supply intellectual property rights ====
Refusing to license intellectual property rights, or providing interoperability information by a dominant firm, are regarded as improper exercise of intellectual property rights (IPR) and can fall under Article 102.

===== The cases of Renault and Volvo =====
The issue of whether the use of an IPR could amount to abuse of a dominant position was examined for the first time by the European Court of Justice (ECJ) in the combined cases of Renault and Volvo. It was held that a refusal to grant a licence should not in itself constitute an abuse of a dominant position. However, if a dominant undertaking:

1. arbitrary refuses to supply spare parts to independent repairers, or
2. is fixing prices of spare parts at an unfair level, or
3. adopts a decision of no longer producing spare parts for a particular model, even though many cars of that model are still in circulation.

might result to an abuse of dominant position.

===== Magill case =====
In the case of Magill the ECJ made one of the most important decisions on the relationship between Intellectual property law and European Union (EU) law. Magill wanted to publish a comprehensive, weekly television guide, which would contain program listings for all television channels available in Ireland and Northern Ireland. However, the television channels of RTÉ, ITV and BBC, which broadcast in Ireland and Northern Ireland, was each publishing its own television guide and were enjoying protection under copyright law. There was an obvious public demand for weekly listings magazines, but these broadcasting companies were refusing to grant a licence to Magill. The ECJ stated that a conduct of a dominant undertaking will not be exempted from being reviewed under Article 102, because of national copyright legislation. Even though as a principle, a mere refusal to license is not abuse, it can give rise to an abuse in exceptional circumstances. The Court held that, the refusal to grant licence constituted an abuse for three reasons.

1. They prevented a new product from entering the market (in this case a comprehensive, weekly television program guide, which the television companies did not offer), for which a potential consumer demand existed.
2. The refusal was not justified.
3. The television companies were eliminating the competition in the secondary market of weekly television guides.

By denying access to the basic information, that was indispensable to the compilation of the new product in question, which was the television guide, they were excluding all competitors from the market.

===== Bronner v Mediaprint =====
The circumstances that led to the Magill judgment were stressed in Bronner v Mediaprint. The Court held that it needed to be shown that the refusal was likely to eliminate all competition in the daily newspaper market, while being unjustifiable. Also, that service had to be indispensable to carrying out Bronner's business, and there was no actual or potential substitute.

===== IMS case =====
In the case of IMS the court followed the decision in Bronner. The Court had to consider whether the refusal to license might have "excluded all competitors in a secondary market" and whether it might "prevented the emergence of a new product". The court stated that a refusal to grant a licence by a dominant undertaking does not in itself constitute an abuse, unless the following conditions are fulfilled:

1. The refusal is preventing a new product or service, for which there is a potential consumer demand, from entering the market.
2. This refusal is not justified by any objective considerations.
3. The refusal is such as to exclude any competitors from a secondary market.

Then, the criteria restated by the court in Bronner, had to be considered. The Court stated that, a balance between the economic freedom of an IP owner and the protection of competition in general had to be achieved. The latter can only prevail when a refusal to grant a licence, prevents a secondary market from developing, which affects consumers in a negative way. Consequently, the licence must lead to the development of a secondary market and not only in the existence of a new product, or a replication of what the IP owner is already doing.

===== Microsoft v Commission =====
In the case of Microsoft v Commission, the Court of First instance clarified how the exceptional circumstances, as identified in Magill and IMS, should be approached. Microsoft held over 90 per cent of the personal computer operating systems market. The personal computer operating system used by clients had to be compatible with the workgroup server operating system, in order for them to function in a network. However, Microsoft was refusing to supply its competitors with interoperability information and to authorise that information to be used in the development of work group server operating systems, that was in competition with Microsoft. As a result, other workgroup server operating systems could not remain in competition with Microsoft's one. The Court referred to the previous cases of Magill, Bronner and IMS when approaching the issue. It held that refusal to license by a dominant undertaking does not in itself constitute as an abuse of dominant position under Article 102, unless it falls within the exceptional circumstances. The Court agreed with the Commission that, the clients' computers operating with the Microsoft Operating system, had to be compatible with non-Microsoft group workgroup server operating systems, for them to stay viable on the market. This meant that the interoperability information of the Personal Computers, was necessary for the exercise of a particular activity on the secondary market of workgroup servers' operating systems, and thus indispensable for the maintenance of effective competition. Microsoft then tried to argue that the refusal would not exclude all competition from a secondary market. However, the Court clarified that, it is not necessary to show that all competition is to be eliminated. It is only necessary to show that the refusal is liable, or likely to eliminate all effective competition on the market. This was likely to occur as organisations were not keen on moving away from Microsoft's Operating System. Additionally, Microsoft tried to argue that the refusal did not prevent any new product from entering the market, for which, an unsatisfied consumer demand existed. The competitors only wanted to copy Microsoft's product. The Court noted that, this should be considered in the context of Article 102(2)(b). The provision states that a prejudice of consumers may arise, when there is limitation of technical development, and not only when there is limitation of market or production. Microsoft's refusal resulted to consumers being forced, in a way, to use Microsoft's workgroup server. Finally, Microsoft's justification that it had made significant investments for that technology and granting the licence would eliminate future incentives to invest in the development of intellectual property, was found unjustifiable.

==== Miscellaneous other non-pricing abuses ====
Conduct that does not fit within the scope of the aforementioned categories. Examples include harming the competitive structure of the market, vexatious litigation and preferential treatment.

=== Exploitative abuse ===
This type occurs whereby a dominant firm using dominant position to exploit consumers without losing them through conduct like price increase and production limitation. There is no legal definition of 'exploitative abuse' under Article 102 but it can be taken as 'any conduct that directly causes harm to the customers of the dominant undertaking'. Without barriers to entry, the market is likely to be self-corrected by competition because monopoly profits will attract new competitors to enter the market. However, the Guidance does suggest that the commission will intervene where the conduct is directly exploitative of consumers (for example, charging excessively high prices). Some examples of exploitative conduct include:

Unfair trading conditions

Imposition of conditions on its customers that directly harm them. Such as exploitation of copyrights imposes unnecessary obligations on its members. The commission also condemned ticket selling arrangement which was held to be unfair to consumers who are not French.

Excessive price

Price set significantly above the competitive level. Article 102 explicitly bans unfair pricing which has been understood as to cover the excessive pricing. The charged price must be excessive and unfair to be abusive. The test used was stated in the United Brands case that whether the charged price has no reasonable relation to the economic value of the product supplied and exceeds what the dominant undertaking would have obtained in a normal and sufficiently competitive market.

Collecting societies

Organization with the authority to license copyrights collects royalties from users of the copyright and distributes them to copyright owners for a fee. Abusive behaviour that has been banned by the Commission under Article 102 includes discriminating undertakings from other member states; charging excessive royalties; unreasonably restricting an author's unilateral behaviour by clauses.

=== Single market abuse ===
Behaviours detrimental to principles of the internal market such as intra-brand competition jeopardise the single market imperative and are therefore caught by Article 102.

==== Pricing practices ====
Single market abuse is presented in the case of British Leyland, by where a dominant firm carried out excessive pricing, which not only has an exploitative effect but may also prevent parallel imports and limit intra-brand competition. In this particular case, British Leyland charged £150 to any importer in the continent that required a certificate to drive cars in the UK. The main issue was not the huge profits that were received, but the fact that parallel exports could not occur smoothly. This demonstrates that the impediment of single market rules will be differentiated from exploitative actions by the Courts. Further cases to support this include General Motors where the facts were very similar. General Motors charged excessive prices for technical inspections in parallel imports, thus inhibiting them. Deutsche Post AG consisted of a situation where the Deutsche Post refused to allow bulk-mailings from the UK into Germany unless a surcharge was paid. Furthermore, they also delayed the release of intercepted mailings. This very much impeded the establishment of a single market postage system.

Another example of a condemned pricing practice harmful to the single market is geographic price discrimination. A popular case on this issue is the United Brands case where different Member States were charged varying prices of up to 50% for equivalent transactions with no factual justifications. This impeded those buyers from reselling at a similar profit margin to other Member States as they were all charged very differently, thus harming the single market. In the case of Tetra Pak II Italy was always charged a much lower price than other Member States for all the different types of packaging that Tetra offered. This was again an unjustifiable geographical discrimination which harmed competition.

Rebates (and similar pricing practices) that hinder imports and exports are defined in Competition law as a reduction in the price of a product. It has the potential to be legal if it is used to encourage customers to buy products in greater volume, but over several decades of cases it has developed into a dangerous breach of Article 102 if they are used to stop a customer importing from other Member States, thus ensuring they remain 'loyal'. This was concluded in several cases, beginning with Hoffman–La Roche. The world-leading vitamin firm was using loyalty rebates to keep their customers and maintain their dominant position in the market, thus harming healthy competition. Almost 20 years later, the case of Irish Sugar saw an undertaking with 90% market share use border rebates to prevent customers getting cheaper sugar from the UK competitor. The well-known Michelin II case included the aforementioned quantity-based rebates, but in this situation, they were found to be too loyalty inducing by the Courts and were thus a single market abuse. It was also one of the first cases to talk about the fact that dominant undertakings have special responsibilities and can get punished for doing things that a non-dominant undertaking would be allowed to do. The danger of using rebates was clearly seen in Tomra as the simple notion of possible loyalty inducing effects via rebates was enough to justify a breach, without any cost analysis. All that was needed was the capability of an effect on competition. The most recent case of Intel saw the company be fined over one billion euros for giving rebates to manufacturers in exchange for agreements to get most of their supply from Intel.

==== Non-pricing practices ====
Non-pricing practices harmful to the internal market will also be held to infringe Article 102, though they are much more difficult to categorize due to their varying nature. In United Brands v Commission, UB was also condemned for including clauses in contracts with distributors with the effect of preventing parallel imports between countries by imposing a restriction on the export of un-ripened bananas. In other words, there was an unreasonable clause that prevented their customers from exporting bananas if they were green, which would therefore make it difficult to do so. British Leyland's refusal to supply certificates unless a fee was paid acted as a ploy to prevent the free movement of goods in the single market. In Romanian Power Exchange the Courts found a discrimination based on nationality as non-Romanian wholesale electricity traders were required to obtain a VAT registration. Interestingly, GlaxoSmithKline demonstrated that manufacturers of pharmaceuticals must only supply what is determined as necessary by the national standards, not what is requested by the wholesalers and can therefore limit parallel trade to an extent, unlike undertakings in other fields. Hilti was a case where the undertaking wanted to leave the UK market untouched by its products and restricted trade there, which was a breach of Article 102. Finally, in the energy and transport market, the three cases of BEH Energy, Gazprom and Lithuanian Energy all portrayed territorial restrictions without excessive pricing. As their punishments, BEH had to promise to the Commission to set up a new power exchange in Bulgaria, Gazprom promised to revise restrictions on resale of gas in Central and Eastern Europe, as well as ensure prices reflect the competitive benchmark and lastly, Lithuanian Energy had to rebuild a railway they destroyed to prevent a customer using a rival's services, as well as being fined 27.8 million euros.

== See also ==
- Article 101 of the Treaty on the Functioning of the European Union
- European Union competition law
