= Ferry flying =

Logistical aviation flight

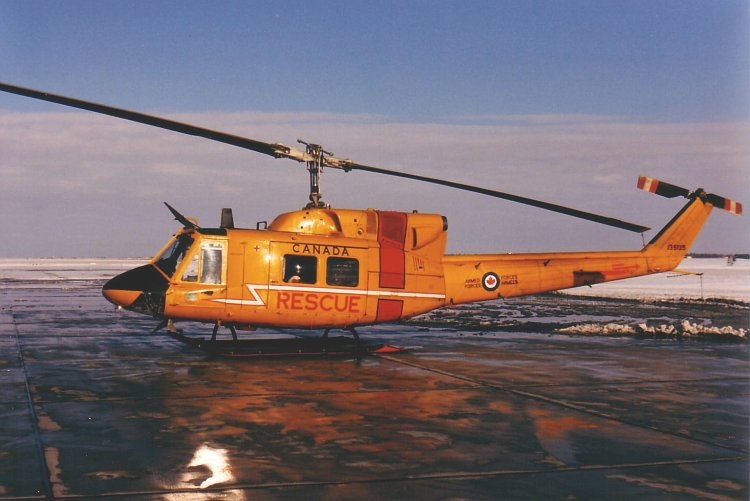
A Canadian Forces CH-135 Twin Huey from Base Rescue Goose Bay delivered by a ferry crew to CFB Winnipeg for Depot Level Inspection and Repair at Bristol Aerospace in 1988.

Ferry flying or a positioning flight is the flying of aircraft for the purpose of returning the aircraft to base, delivering it to a customer, moving it from one base of operations to another, or moving it to or from a maintenance facility that includes maintenance, repair, and operations.

A commercial airliner may need to be moved from one airport to another to satisfy the next day's timetable or facilitate routine maintenance. This is commonly known as a positioning flight or repositioning flight, and may carry revenue freight or passengers as local aviation regulations and airline policies allow. Such flights may be necessary following a major weather event or other similar disruption which causes multiple cancellations across an airline's network, resulting in many aircraft and crew being out of position for normal operations; the 2010 eruptions of Eyjafjallajökull or the mass evacuation of US airspace following the 9/11 attacks were significant examples of this.

== Ferry permit ==
A ferry permit is a written authorization issued by a National Airworthiness Authority to move a non-airworthy civil aircraft from its present location to a maintenance facility to be inspected, repaired and returned to an airworthy state.

== Ferry pilots ==
Louise Sacchi flew single- and multi-engine planes 340 times across both the Atlantic and Pacific oceans, breaking several records in the process.

Other notable ferry pilots include:

- Helen Marcelle Harrison Bristol
- Lettice Curtis
- Maureen Dunlop de Popp
- Mary Ellis, WWII pilot in the United Kingdom
- Nathan Fielder, comedian who featured himself ferry flying on season 2 of The Rehearsal (TV series)
- Luis Fontés
- Joan Hughes
- Amy Johnson
- Jim Mollison
- Robert Neale
- Robert Olds
- Jarvis Offutt
- Jadwiga Piłsudska
- C. W. A. Scott
- Diana Barnato Walker
- Margrit Waltz

== See also ==
- Air Transport Auxiliary, UK civil aviation organization that ferried military aircraft during World War II (WWII)
- Air Transport Command, US Army Air Forces (USAAF) command charged with ferrying aircraft during WWII
- Dead mileage, a similar concept in ground transportation
- Ferry range
- RAF Ferry Command, UK military command charged with ferrying US aircraft to the UK during WWII
- United Kingdom aircraft test serials
- Women Airforce Service Pilots, US civil aviation organization that trained women pilots to ferry USAAF aircraft during WWII
