= Francesca Sacchi Tommasi =

Italian art dealer

- Born: Florence, Italy
- Education: Academic degree
- Alma mater: Koefia Academy of Arts and Costume
- Occupation: Art dealer
- Parent(s): Claudio Sacchi and Ilaria Tommasi
- Relatives: Marcello Tommasi (grandfather)

Francesca Sacchi Tommasi is an Italian art dealer and gallery owner, known for her management of two contemporary art galleries in Florence and Pietrasanta.

== Early life ==
Francesca Sacchi Tommasi is the daughter of the artist Claudio Sacchi and Ilaria Tommasi. She is also the granddaughter of Marcello Tommasi. She studied Political sciences at the University of "La Sapienza" based in Rome.

== Career ==
Raised in a family of artists, Francesca trained at the Koefia Academy of Arts and Costume in Rome. After an experience in the fashion industry as an organizer of fashion shows in Milan (Prada, Fendi), in 2008, she moved to Positano, where she worked for the galleries Franco Senesi Fine Arts and Liquid Art System.

In 2014, she opened her own contemporary art gallery, Etra Studio Tommasi, in the studio of her grandfather, the sculptor Marcello Tommasi, in via della Pergola in Florence. Five centuries ago, in this studio, Benvenuto Cellini cast the extraordinary Perseus that towers from the Loggia dei Lanzi in Piazza della Signoria. In the early 1970s, Marcello Tommasi bought the area and transformed it into his studio. Francesca Sacchi Tommasi returned the space to its former splendour, preserving its memory with a careful and respectful restoration of the original spaces and furniture, and by entrusting the careful storage of the corpus of the works to art historian Elisa Gradi.

Etra Studio Tommasi Firenze hosts the collection of Marcello Tommasi, as well as a selection of other works created by the Tommasi family. A bronze self-portrait sculpture of Marcello Tommasi was donated by his family to the Uffizi Gallery in 2014.

Another gallery was opene by Etra Studio Tommasi in the ancient studio of Leone Tommasi, in Pietrasanta. This art studio is deeply linked to the artistic history of the town, where you can find the location just outside the center known to be an area of historic foundries. Since the late twenties, sculptor Leone Tommasi has worked there, followed by his son, painter and sculptor Marcello Tommasi. In this atelier, in the fifties, Leone Tommasi worked on the monumental sculptures for the Palazzo dell'Aiuto Sociale in Buenos Aires, and then for the project of the monument to Eva Perón, commissioned by the Argentine president Juan Domingo Péron. Even today, the space, illuminated by the typical large window on the north wall, contains an exceptional collection of sketches and plaster casts by the two Pietrasantini sculptors. Their works were loved even outside Italy, and they contributed to animating an international artistic climate in Versilia. In 2014, Francesca Sacchi Tommasi contributed to the exhibition "Tommasi. Ab Imis" in Pietrasanta. Exhibitions held at Etra Studio Tommasi in Pietrasanta include a show on Gaetano Pesce.

At the same time, Francesca Sacchi Tommasi is dedicated to the organization and artistic direction of exhibitions of ancient, modern, and contemporary art, including "Il Tesoro d'Italia", curated by Vittorio Sgarbi, "The Gran Tour of photographers at Expo", edited by Italo Zannier, "Anima e Scultura", in the Vittoriale degli Italiani by d'Annunzio, "Il Museo della Follia", in the Palazzo della Ragione in Mantua, "Expo Arte contemporanea", at Villa Bagatti Valsecchi, during Expo 2015, "You can sculpt the Soul?", with the care of Vittorio Sgarbi (museum MuSa, Salò 2016).
