= Louise Sacchi =

American aviator

- Born: April 15, 1913
- Died: March 22, 1997 (aged 83)
- Occupations: Aviator; author

Louise Sacchi (April 15, 1913 – March 22, 1997) was an American aviator and author who flew numerous times across the world's oceans, often solo, ferrying single and multi-engine planes. As the first international woman ferry pilot, she piloted planes across the Pacific and Atlantic oceans over 340 times, more than any other non-airline pilot. Sacchi Avenue in Gander, Newfoundland, a frequent refueling stop for her Atlantic crossings, was named in honor of Louise Sacchi.

== Records and Races ==
On June 28, 1971, she set a women's speed record by flying a single-engine land plane from New York to London in 17 hours and 10 minutes, a record that still stands today. Following the New York to London flight on July 1, 1971 she departed Abingdon, England, on the first leg of a seven-day air race to Victoria, B.C., Canada. She finished 2nd in class and tied with Race 31 for overall eighth.

== Legacy ==
Sacchi won numerous awards in her career, which spanned over 40 years, and was the first woman to win the prestigious Godfrey L. Cabot Award for distinguished service to aviation.

== Publications ==
- Ocean Flying, McGraw-Hill, 1979, ISBN 0-07-054405-0
- The Happy Commuter - Autobiographical Sketches, 1996, Louise Sacchi.
