= Crisóstomo Martinez =

Crisóstomo Martínez
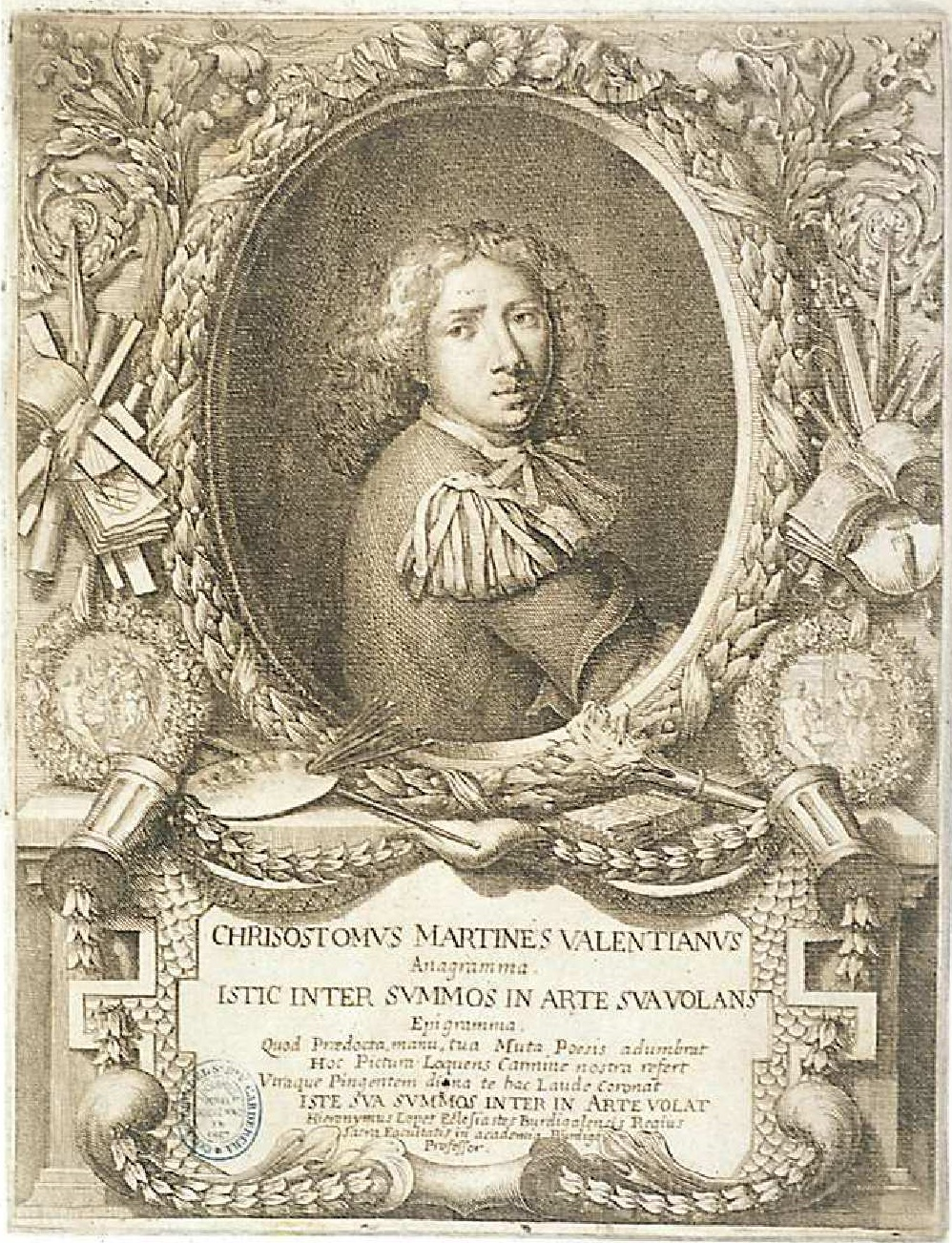
- Crisóstomo Martínez
- Born: 1638
- Died: 1694 (aged 55–56)
- Known for: Anatomical and microscopical works
- Scientific career
- Fields: engraver anatomy

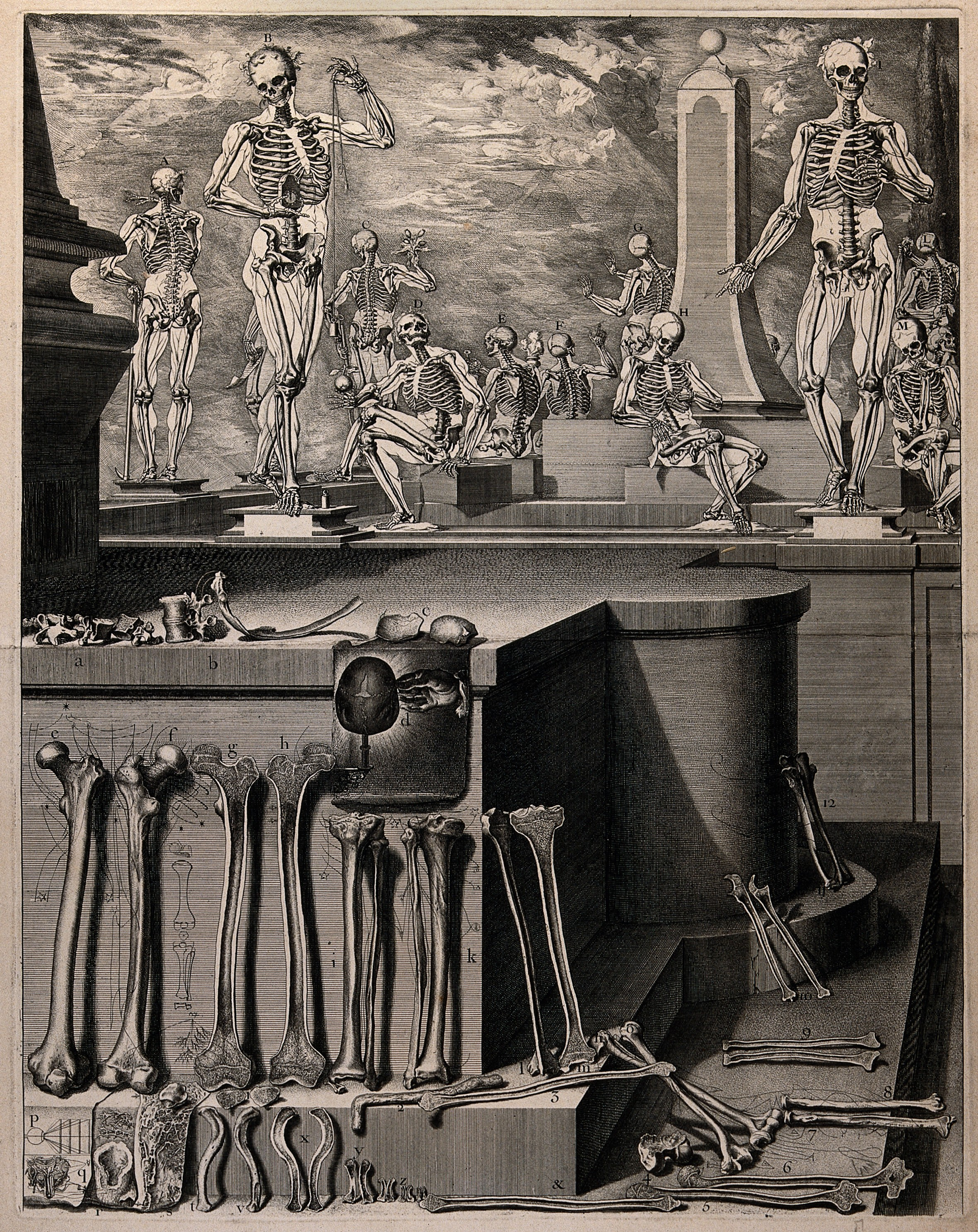
Skeletons and Bones, by Crisóstomo Martínez, Biblioteca Nacional de España

Crisóstomo Martínez (1638–1694) was a Spanish painter, engraver, anatomist and microscopist from Valencia, known for his atlas of anatomy. His work has been ascribed to the Spanish intellectual movement called "Novator" which refers to the beginnings of the scientific revolution in the Kingdom of Spain in the late seventeenth century. The most innovative aspect of his work was an interest in embryology and microscopy, which he applied to the study of "fresh" osteology.

== Bibliography ==
- GARCÍA MARTÍNEZ, S. "La cátedra valenciana de anatomía durante el último tercio del siglo XVII", en: Actas del III Congreso Nacional de HIstoria de la Medicina, Valencia, 1969, Vol II, pp. 167–185.
- GÓMEZ, Santiago (Feb 2002). "Crisóstomo Martinez, 1638-1694: the discoverer of trabecular bone". Endocrine. 17 (1). United States: 3–4. doi:10.1385/ENDO:17:1:03. ISSN 1355-008X. PMID 12014701. S2CID 46340228.
- LÓPEZ PIÑERO, José María, El Atlas Anatómico de Crisóstomo Martínez, Valencia, Ayuntamiento de Valencia, 3ªed. 2001.
- LÓPEZ TERRADA, M.J. y JEREZ MOLINER, F. «El "atlas anatómico" de Crisóstomo Martínez como ejemplo de "Vanitas"», Boletín del Museo e Instituto Camón Aznar, 1994, 56:5-34
- VALVERDE, Nuria (Sep 2009). "Small parts: Crisóstomo Martínez (1638-1694), bone histology, and the visual making of body wholeness". Isis. 100 (3). United States: 505–36. doi:10.1086/644627. ISSN 0021-1753. PMID 19960840. S2CID 6460940.
- VELASCO MORGADO, Raúl, "Aportaciones al conocimiento de Crisóstomo Martínez y su "atlas de anatomía", Asclepio, 212; 64(1): 189-212.
