= Tommaso Sacchi =

Italian politician (born 1983)

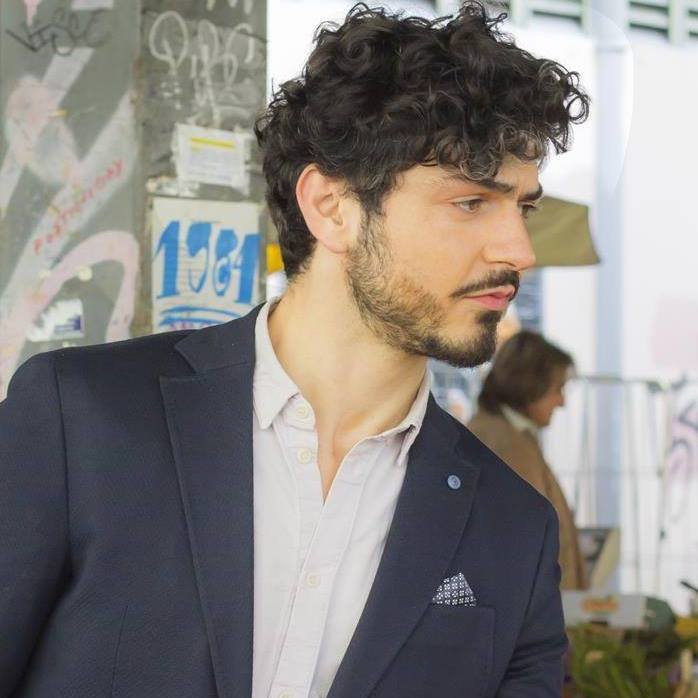

Personal details
- Born: 20 January 1983 (age 43) Milan, Italy
- Education: University of Milan; University of Staffordshire
- Profession: Politician, curator, artistic director, deputy mayor for culture, fashion and design of the city of Florence. Chairman of Fondazione Teatro della Toscana – Teatro della Pergola and Chairman of Stibbert Museum.

Tommaso Sacchi (born 20 January 1983) is an Italian politician, curator, artistic director, Deputy-Mayor for Culture, Fashion and Design of the City of Florence, Italy.

He is the Chairman of Fondazione Teatro della Toscana – Teatro della Pergola and the Chairman of Stibbert Museum.

== Biography ==
Tommaso Sacchi was born in Milan, Italy, in 1983. He graduated in Communication Sciences from the University of Milan, and then he obtained the Master of Arts in Social and Cultural Theory at Staffordshire University in Great Britain.

Sacchi taught Communications and Journalism at the Accademia di Belle Arti "Aldo Galli" of Como, and Exhibition Planning and Management at the European Institute of Design in Florence.

In 2011–2013, he was chief advisor to the Department of Culture, Fashion and Design for the City of Milan during the mandate of Councilor Stefano Boeri (Italian architect and urban planner). He served as Chief Communications Officer for Stefano Boeri Architetti following the opening campaign of Bosco Verticale in Milan.

He was founder and curator of the "CROSS International Performance Award" (an internationally recognised prize for Performing Arts) and a member of the Quality Jury Pool, along with (among years) Manuel Agnelli, Yuri Ancarani, Adrian Paci, Italo Rota.

Sacchi was co-curator and co-author of installations and talks at Venice Biennale for Contemporary Art, directed by Okwui Enwezor (2015); Berlin Biennale, directed by Juan Gaitan (2014); Architecture Venice Biennale, directed by Rem Koohlaas (2014).

In 2014–2015, Sacchi was head of the Cultural Department Secretariat of the City of Florence and Art Director of the Estate Fiorentina Festival "Florentine Summer" (2015–2019), the biggest Italian interdisciplinary cultural festival that lights up the city with events, artistic installations, musical productions and performances.

He was co-curator of the biennial SUSAS _ Shanghai Urban Space Art Season (2017–2018).

He co-founded the Tomorrow Editorial Project theTomorrow.net.

He has provided art direction for several festivals in major Italian theatres, such as the Auditorium di Milano, Teatro Dal Verme and Università degli Studi di Milano.

Sacchi has curated numerous shows and been the artistic director of numerous festivals and events and publishes in the main national magazines and newspapers on culture.
