= France Telecom SA v Commission =

- Wanadoo is now Orange S.A.
- Court: Court of Justice
- Citation: (2009) C-202/07

Keywords
- Telecommunications

France Telecom SA v Commission (2009) is a European competition law case relevant for UK enterprise law, concerning telecommunications.

== Facts ==
Wanadoo Interactive was part of France Telecom SA after a merger. The Commission found it to have set predatory prices ‘as part of a plan to pre-empt the market in high-speed internet access during a key phase in its development’. France Telecom argued that such a charge should only succeed if proven that the predator is capable of recouping the losses it incurs during its campaign.

The Advocate General's Opinion was sympathetic to recoupment argument.

== Judgment ==
The CJEU held that there is no requirement to prove that recouping losses is possible, and so there was abuse of a dominant position.

110 Accordingly, contrary to what the appellant claims, it does not follow from the case‑law of the Court that proof of the possibility of recoupment of losses suffered by the application, by an undertaking in a dominant position, of prices lower than a certain level of costs constitutes a necessary precondition to establishing that such a pricing policy is abusive. In particular, the Court has taken the opportunity to dispense with such proof in circumstances where the eliminatory intent of the undertaking at issue could be presumed in view of that undertaking’s application of prices lower than average variable costs (see, to that effect, Tetra Pak v Commission, paragraph 44).

111 That interpretation does not, of course, preclude the Commission from finding such a possibility of recoupment of losses to be a relevant factor in assessing whether or not the practice concerned is abusive, in that it may, for example where prices lower than average variable costs are applied, assist in excluding economic justifications other than the elimination of a competitor, or, where prices below average total costs but above average variable costs are applied, assist in establishing that a plan to eliminate a competitor exists.

112 Moreover, the lack of any possibility of recoupment of losses is not sufficient to prevent the undertaking concerned reinforcing its dominant position, in particular, following the withdrawal from the market of one or a number of its competitors, so that the degree of competition existing on the market, already weakened precisely because of the presence of the undertaking concerned, is further reduced and customers suffer loss as a result of the limitation of the choices available to them.

== See also ==
- United Kingdom enterprise law
- EU law
