= Ottone Hamerani =

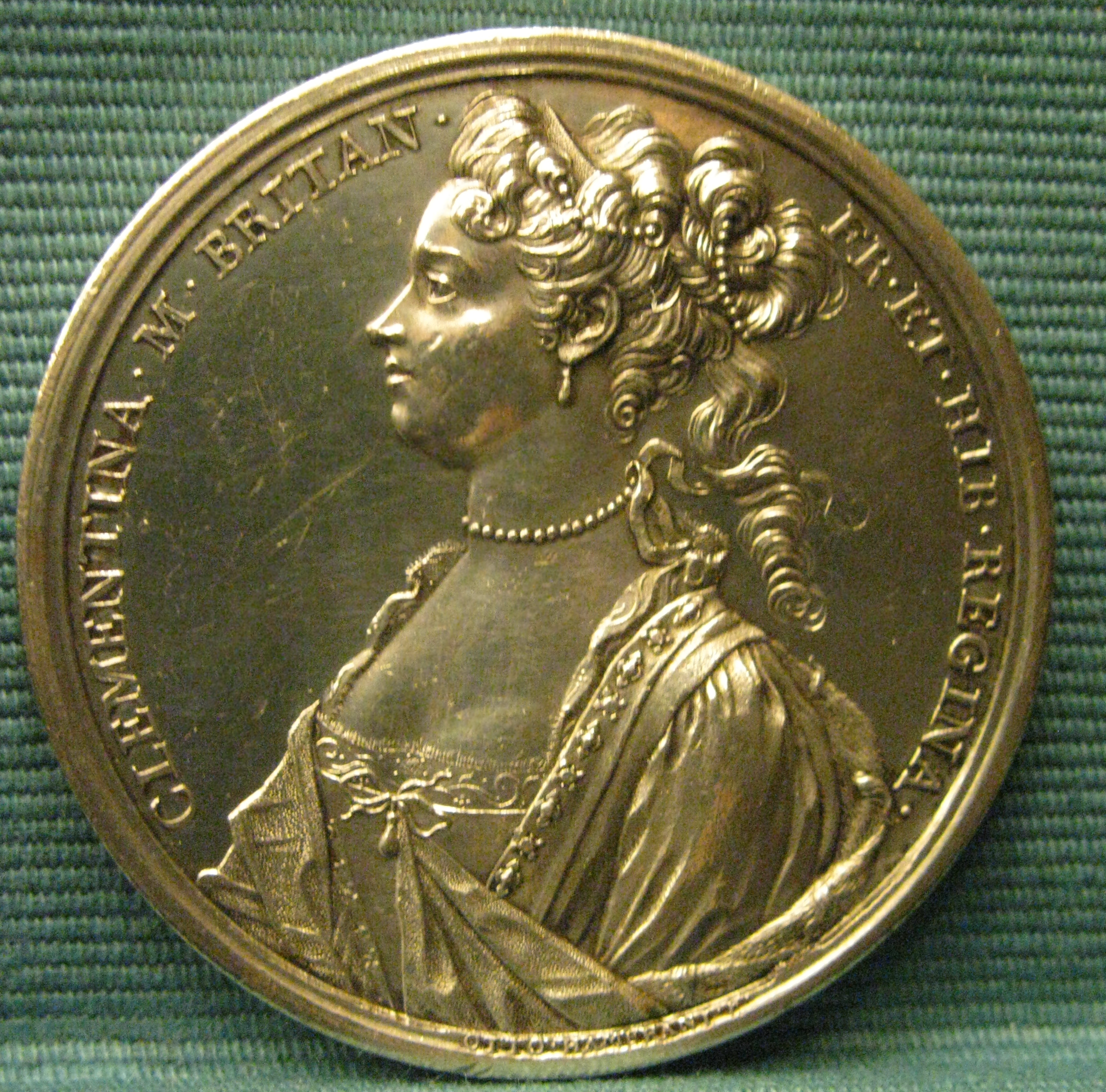
Ottone Hamerani, Medal commemorating Princess Maria Clementina Sobieska, 1719

Ottone Hamerani (1694–1768), also known as Otto Hamerani, was an Italian medallist.

Hamerani was born in Rome, Italy, the son of another medallist Giovanni Hamerani. He worked with several popes in producing coins, and was named Master of the Mint at Rome from 1734 until his death in 1768.

== Biography ==
Ottone, also known as Otto, was the son of another medalist, Giovanni Martino Hamerani, and belonged to the Hamerani dynasty, founded by Johann Andreas Hameran, a coin engraver from Lower Bavaria who had been living in Rome since 1616.

Ottone worked with Clement XII and his successors Pope Benedict XIV and Clement XIII, engraving several medals.

He also engraved several medals on behalf of James Francis Edward Stuart, Jacobite pretender to the throne of England.

He became master of the mint in Rome in 1734 and held the position until his death.
