= Giacomo Lauri =

Giacomo Lauri (1623–1694) was an Italian engraver of the Baroque period, active mainly in his native Rome.

He published, in 1612, a set of 166 prints, entitled Antiquae Urbis Splendor, consisting of views of the ancient buildings of Rome.

== Sources ==
- Bryan, Michael (1889). Walter Armstrong and Robert Edmund Graves (ed.). Dictionary of Painters and Engravers, Biographical and Critical. Vol. II L-Z. London: George Bell and Sons. p. 26.
