= Antonio Sacchi =

Italian painter

Antonio Sacchi (died 1694) was an Italian painter of the Baroque period.

He was born in Como and studied in Rome, where he died in 1694.
