= Agostino Bugiardini =

Italian sculptor

Agostino Bugiardini (died 1623) was an Italian sculptor active in the early Baroque period, mainly in his hometown of Florence, but also in Rome. He was a disciple of Giovanni Caccini, and fellow pupil of Gherardo Silvani.
