= Megalethoscope =

19th-century optical instrument for viewing photographs

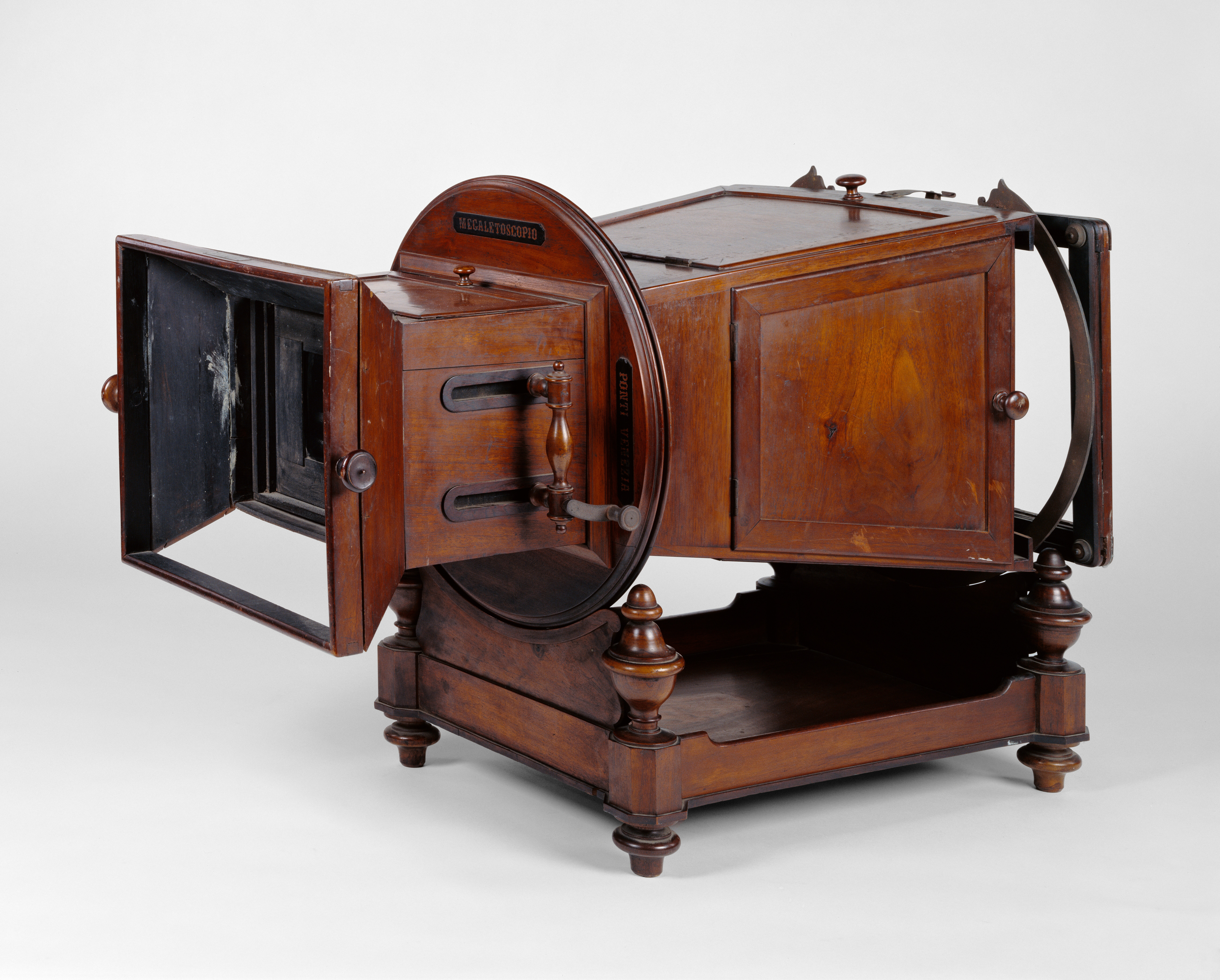
Carlo Ponti's Megalethoscope

The megalethoscope is a larger version (mega-) of the alethoscope, (Italian: alethoscopio, from the Greek “true”, “exact” and “vision”) which it largely superseded, and both are instruments for viewing single photographs with a lens to enlarge and to create some illusion of three-dimensionality. They were used to view photographic albumen prints that were coloured, perforated and mounted on a curved frame. Night effects were achieved when viewing pictures in transmitted light from a fitted oil or kerosine lamp and a daytime version of the same scene was seen when lit by the reflected light from two side mirrors. They are sophisticated versions of the peep show, and were designed by Carlo Ponti of Venice before 1862. Lke the similar graphoscope which descends from the eighteenth century zograscope predating photography, these devices were, and are, often confused with the stereoscope which was of a different design and effect. Improvements to the megalethoscope over the alethoscope, mainly the addition of a compound lens, are detailed in The Practical Mechanic's Journal of 1867.

== Invention ==
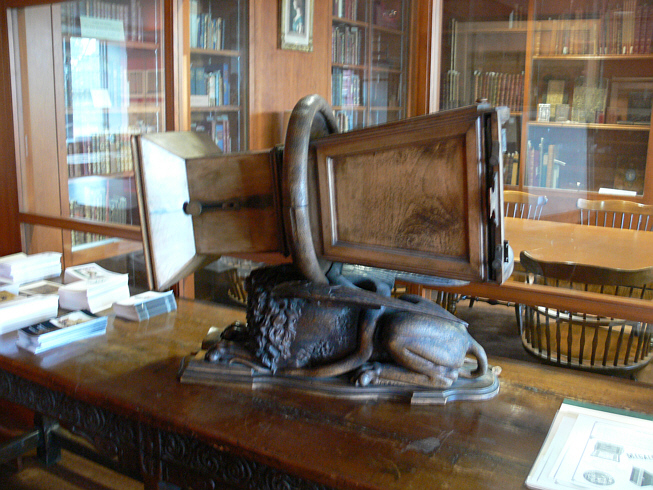
Ponti's Megalethoscope (Princeton University Library)

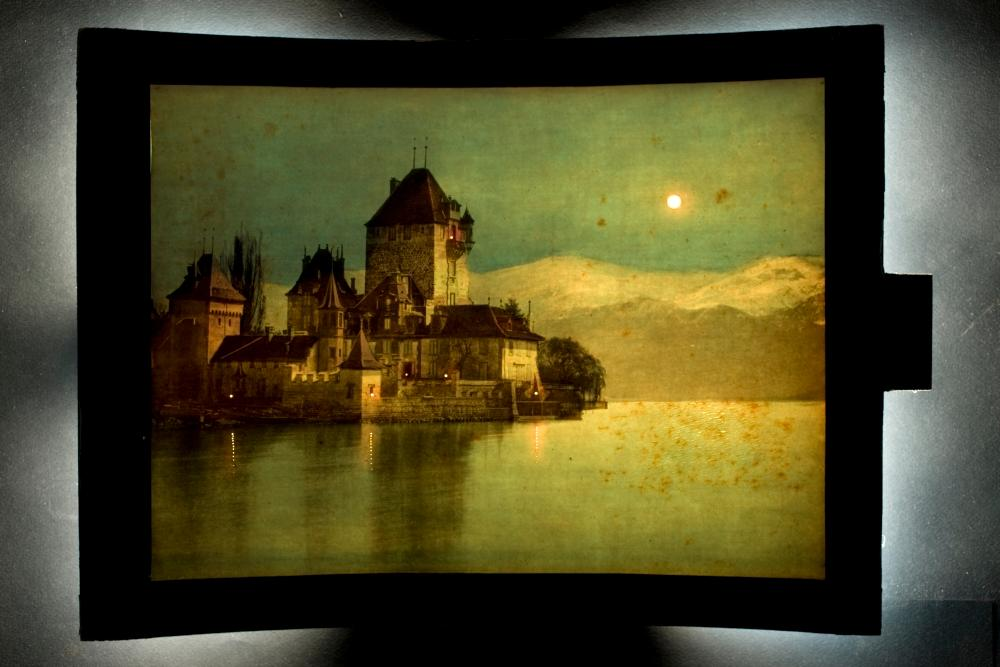
Carlo Ponti, Interlaken, Switzerland, night view albumen print shown rear-lit in megalethoscope

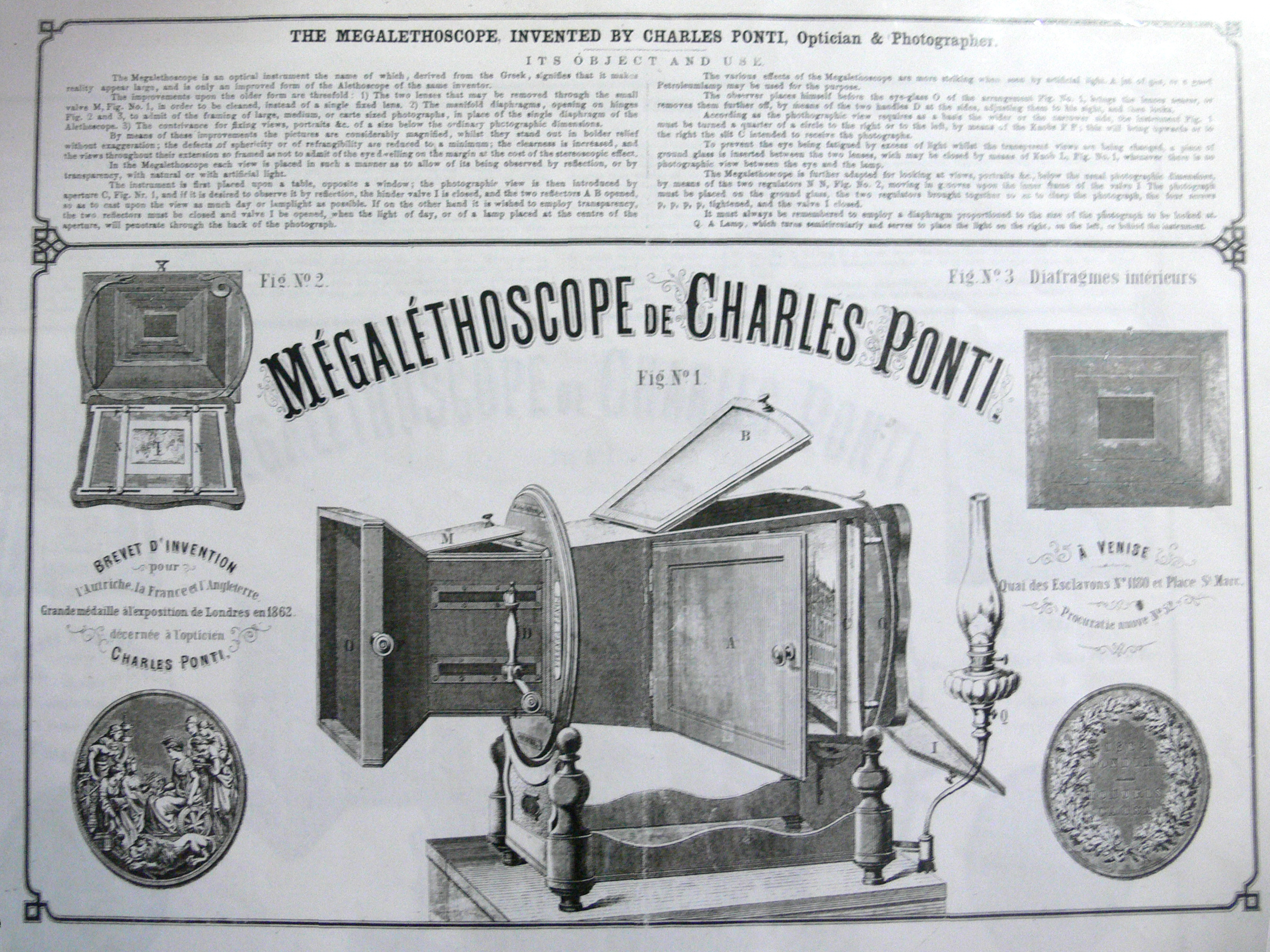
Description of Ponti's Megalethoscope

Optician, photographer and publisher of views for the tourist and art-connoisseur markets, Carlo Ponti invented the alethoscope in 1860. He presented the device to the Société française de photographie in 1861, then in April, to the Istituto di Scienze, Lettere ed Arti in Venice, earning an honourable mention there in May. He obtained a patent in January 1862 and commenced marketing it and photographs to be viewed using the instrument. His invention was awarded Grand Prix at the International Exhibition in London in 1862. The megalethoscope was produced for him by cabinetmaker Demetrio Puppolin, whose name is inscribed on different models. It was a substantial status symbol, an often elaborate item of furniture that only the well-to-do could afford; some are highly decorated with pearl inlay and marquetry, and they often held collections of photographs in a cabinet beneath.

== Description, operation and effect ==
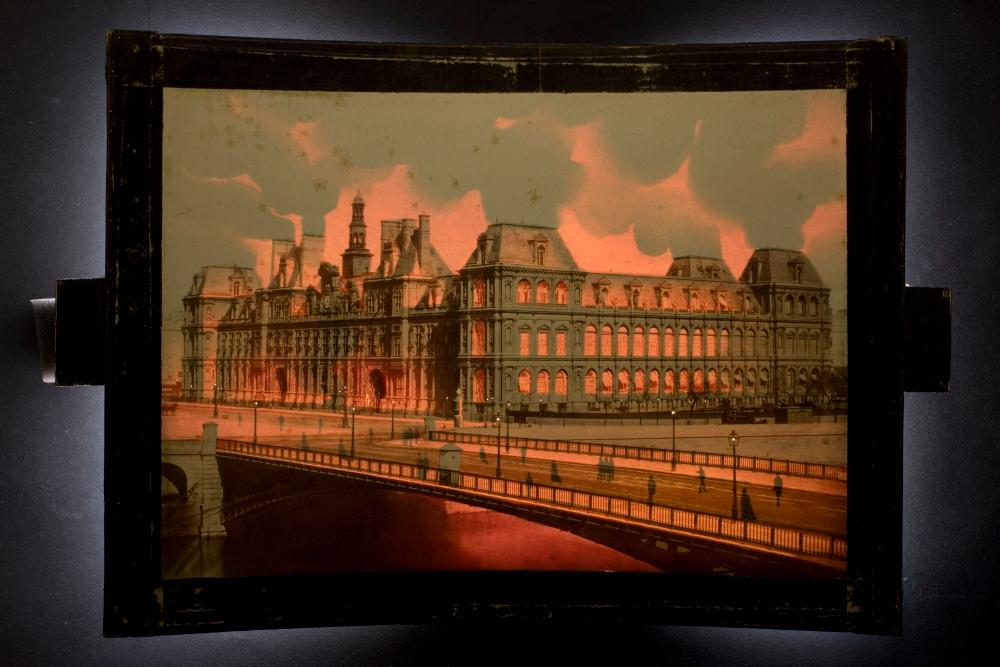
Attributed to Carlo Ponti (after 1871) Burning of the Hotel de Ville, Paris, daytime view. Megalethoscope albumen transparency

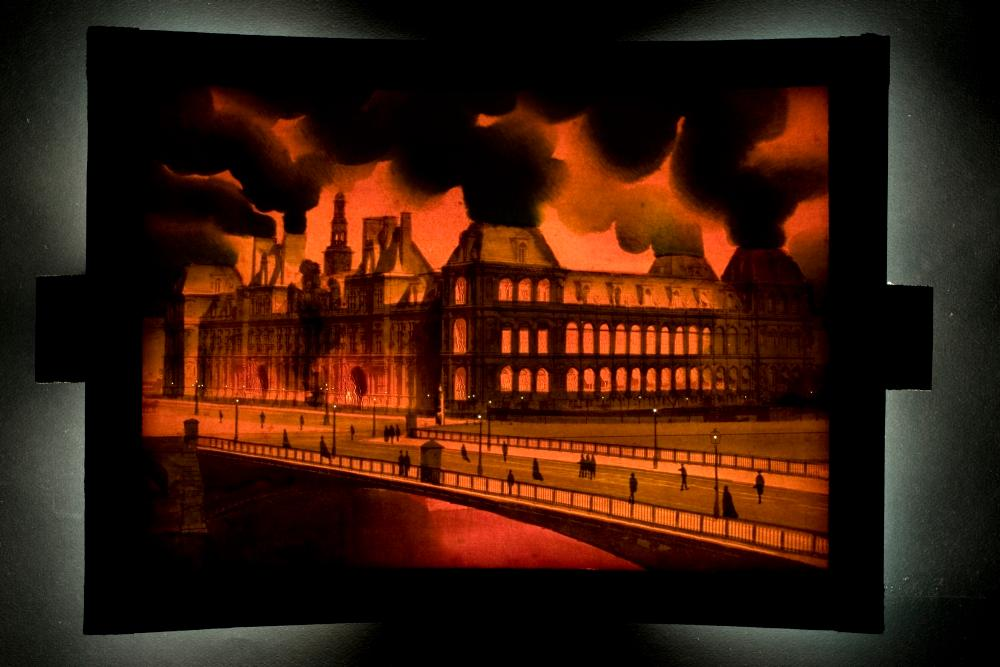
Attributed to Carlo Ponti (after 1871) Burning of the Hotel de Ville, Paris, night view. Megalethoscope albumen transparency

The megalethoscope was for the viewing of single, usually 25 x 34 cm., albumen prints larger than those for the alethoscope. Ponti produced and published his imagery mostly for the tourist market in the waning era of the Grand Tour, but also for connoisseurs of art and architecture, in large quantities and to an international clientele through outlets in Europe, England and America.

The megalethoscope and the alethoscope are capable of a certain illusion of relief. Photographic views are seen enlarged through a wide, thick magnifying glass that creates an illusion of the subjects' plasticity, perspective depth and modelling. The instrument's arrangement minimises surrounding indicators of depth that would let us know this is a flat picture, and also because the image is magnified to nearer the scale of the real scene the picture is depicting. As the light coming from the lens to the eyes is collimated, it confounds accommodation; the image appears suspended at an indeterminable range. The broad, thick lens could also enhance depth perception by creating binocular stereopsis, because each eye views the image through a different part of the magnifying glass; chromatic aberrations at the edges of the lens may contribute to chromostereopsis; and depth clues in the image, which were usually architectural interiors or exteriors in perspective, help to create the illusion.

The Practical Mechanic's Journal of 1867 noted minor improvements over the alethoscope that were made to later models of the megalethoscope, but the relative size of the two otherwise similar instruments is their distinguishing difference;

1. The two lenses [one in front of the other] which may be removed through the small door for the purpose of cleaning them, instead of one fixed lens;

2. the substitution of several diaphragms, opening on a hinge...so as to inclose [sic] large and medium sized photographic views and cartes de visite, for the single diaphragm used in the Alethoscope;

3. the method of fixing ordinary portraits and small photographic views.

By these improvements the magnifying of the views is considerably increased; the relief is more developed, but without exaggeration; the defects of sphericity [of the lens] are reduced to a minimum; greater clearness is obtained; and by the inclosing of the views in a frame, the eye is prevented from wandering to the margin at the expense of the stereoscopic effect.

Each view is so disposed that it may be seen by reflection or as a transparency, and by day or by artificial light. The instrument is first placed on a table in front of a window, and the photographie view is introduced through the aperture... if it be desired to view the object by reflected light, the two reflectors...are opened so as to throw light on the same, but if by transmitted light, the reflectors are closed, the door...opened, and the light at the middle of the aperture passes through the back of the photographic view. Its effects are more striking with artificial light; and a gas burner or petroleum lamp answers the purpose very well.

The observer places himself before the eye-glass ... of the apparatus ... moves forward or draws back the lens, by means of the two lateral handles ... to suit his sight; and according as the photographic view is required to be on the wide or narrow side, the instrument ... is turned a quarter turn from right to left by means of the buttons ... which carry upwards, or to the right, the notch... intended to receive the photographs. In order to prevent the eyes from being strained by the excess of light at the time the transparent views are changed a rough glass is placed between the two lenses when there is no photograph between the eye and the lamp. Two flat bars...sliding in a groove on the internal frame of the door...are provided, which adjust themselves to the size of the smaller views, such as portraits, etc. and ...the size of the diapbragms used should also be proportionate to that of the photographs to be viewed.

The entire unit could be rotated for either horizontal or vertical format images. The albumen photographs may be either backlit by an internal light source—usually an oil or kerosene lantern—or lit by daylight admitted via a system of opening doors. The plates for some versions of the megalethoscope are curved with slotted wooden braces for optical correction of lens aberrations, and pinprick perforations and mechanically thinned areas on the albumen prints have been made for viewing the photographic images under reflected and transmitted light to suggest day or night lighting, fantastic effects (diavoletti) and to add colours.

A degree of animation of megalethoscope views was applied to scenes of events, and as a way to re-enact history, such as a daylight view of an empty St Mark's Square that could be transformed with back lighting into a night scene showing illuminations and lively crowds celebrating of the annexation of the Veneto by the rest of Italy. Another of the transparencies shows the burning of the Hôtel de Ville, Paris during the Paris Commune.

Sets of images take the viewer on a simulated trip along the Grand Canal at night, a popular Venetian tourist experience. Ponti's success benefitted from his familiarity with, and repetition of, traditional painted views, and his distribution network through commercial studios beyond Venice, including that of Francis Frith in the United Kingdom and Pompeo Pozzi in Milan.

== Rights ==
The advent of the albumen print process in the early 1850s meant that photography became a medium of mass visual communication in the hands of early entrepreneurs and from the mid 1850s onwards who produced semi-industrial quantities of copies of pictures from commissioned photographers, processing thousands of prints a month by hundreds of employees. Ponti photographed, and commissioned others, to produce specially prepared photographs for use in the Megalethoscope, distributing all the imagery with his own stamp, so that attribution is often contended.

Ponti and his one-time collaborator, and later rival, in Venice were two of the well-known suppliers of travel photographs, beside the brothers Alinari in Florence, Giacchino Altobelli in Rome, Giorgio Sommer in Naples, Giacomo Brogi and Constantino Brusa in Milano, and the Studio Incorpora in Palermo. Ponti collaborated with Francesco Maria Zinelli and Giuseppe Beniamino Coen to handle the volume of his sale.

Ponti's rights to the alethoscope and megalethoscope lapsed after1866, due to administrative confusion after the Third Italian War of Independence, when Venice, along with the rest of the Veneto, became part of the newly created Kingdom of Italy. Despite Ponte's legal battles between 1868 and 1876 to prevent it, Carlo Naya began to manufacture and sell the Aletoscopio and Megalethoscopio (in some versions labelled a 'graphoscope') which Ponti tried to counter by issuing variations of the instrument under other names including Amfoteroscopio, Dioramoscopio, Pontioscopio, or Cosmorama Fotografico. Well aware of their market value, Naya counter-sued Ponti for the many views that he had taken and were sold with Ponti's megalethoscope, though many were actually taken by Naya's assistants.

== Developments ==
Megalethoscope prints continued to be produced into the 1890s, and in the twentieth century, simpler, mirrored devices, like the shomescope (1914), snapscope (1925 to 1935), some of them toys, including the reflectoscope (1930s), were claimed to provide three-dimensional effect from two-dimensional single images.
