= Carlo Ponti (disambiguation) =

Carlo Ponti (1912–2007) was an Italian film producer.

Carlo Ponti may also refer to:

- Carlo Ponti (conductor) (born 1968), orchestral conductor of Italian origin
- Carlo Ponti (photographer) (1823–1893), Swiss-born optician and photographer
