= Quinto Cenni =

Italian painter

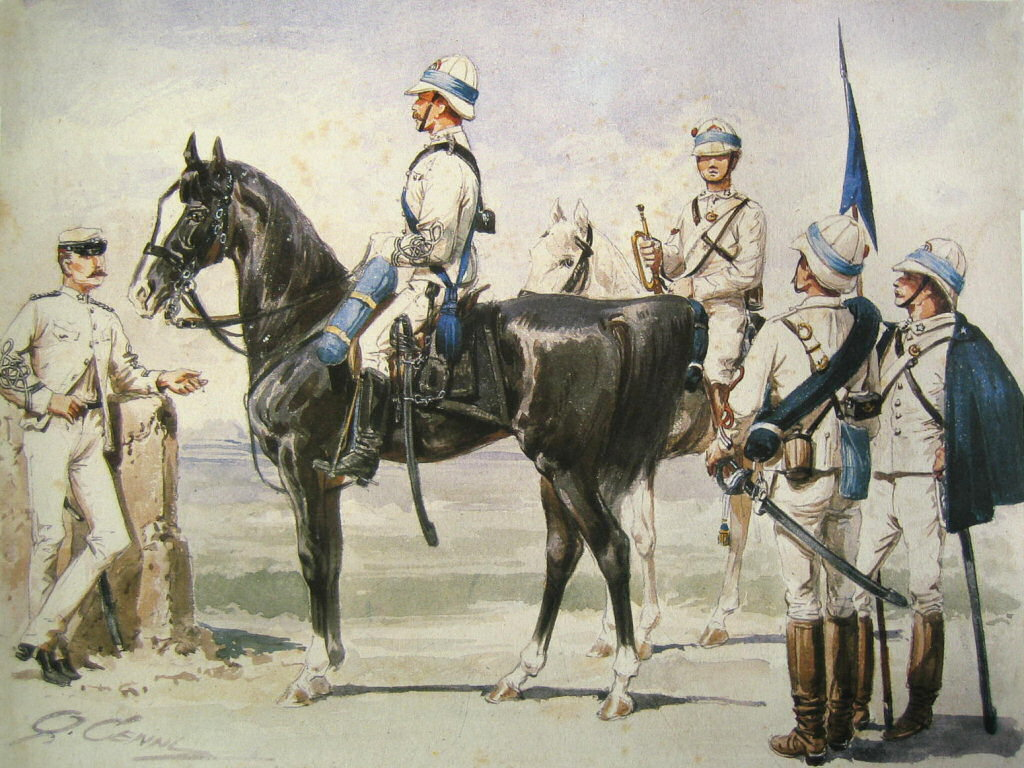
Italian Cavalry in East Africa, 1885–86

Quinto Cenni (20 March 1845 – 13 August 1917) was an Italian painter, engraver, lithographer and illustrator who specialized in depicting military personnel and their uniforms.

== Biography ==
He was born in Imola in the Papal States to a family with liberal sympathies, some of whose members later fought with Giuseppe Garibaldi. His father died in 1856 and his children became scattered. Quinto was sent to Bologna, where a government grant from the city of Imola enabled him to enroll at the Accademia di Belle Arti, where he studied with Napoleone Angiolini. He soon became interested in new technologies and, from 1862 to 1867, studied xylography with Francesco Ratti. In 1867, three years after the death of his mother, he moved to Milan where he continued his studies at the Accademia di Brera.

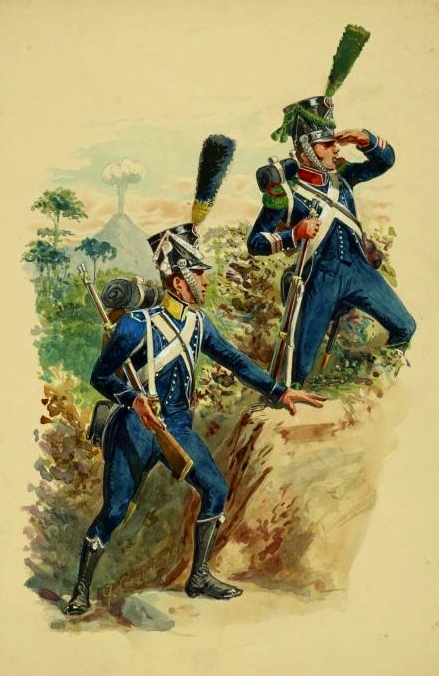
First Infantry Regiment from Naples in 1812

At that time, photography was still a cumbersome process, so Cenni had an opportunity to develop his skills as an engraver and lithographer by providing images for the numerous illustrated magazines that were coming into existence after the Risorgimento. After 1870, he worked for numerous periodicals, notably Emporio pittoresco (published by Casa Sonzogno) and L'Illustrazione Italiana (published by Fratelli Treves). From 1887 to 1897, he was Editor of L'Illustrazione Militare Italiana.

By then, he had already chosen to specialize in military subjects, spending many hours on research to assure that the details of the uniforms and equipment were perfectly accurate. Sometimes, he consulted with foreign experts on weaponry specifications. He strove to make daily life in the barracks as interesting as the more dramatic maneuvers, carried out during summer in the picturesque Italian countryside. Peacetime soldiering was portrayed in his works as a generally attractive and challenging fulfillment of one's patriotic duty toward the newly unified Italian state.

Even after the beginning of World War I, he attempted to stay fully informed, but this became increasingly difficult as the situation deteriorated, and he died in Carate Brianza before the war was over.

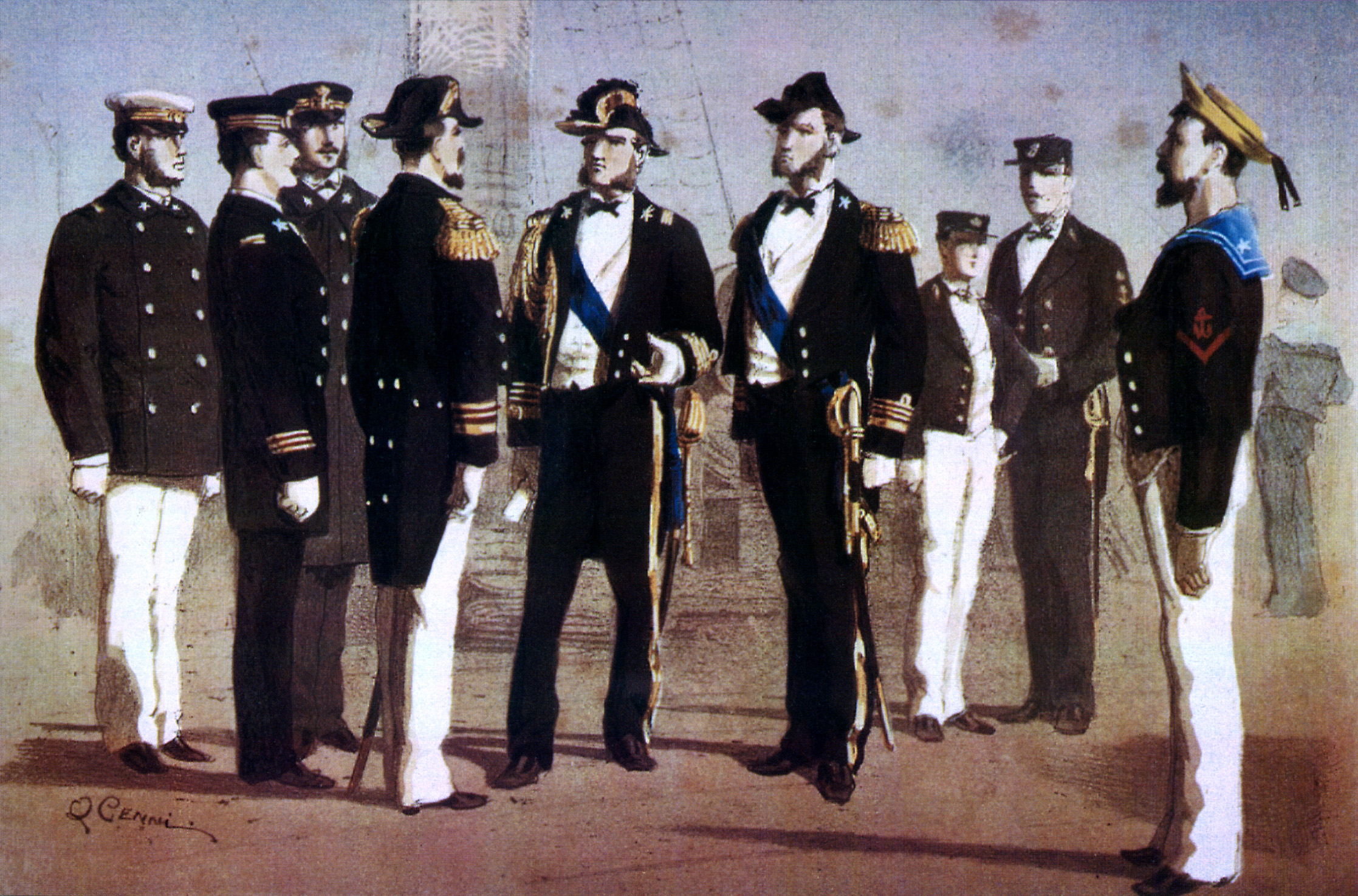
Uniforms of the Italian Royal Navy, 1873

From 1878 to 1916, he published over a dozen albums featuring various aspects of the Italian military, including volumes on the Bersaglieri (1886), Granatieri (1887), and Carabinieri (1894). He also provided illustrations for I promessi sposi by Alessandro Manzoni; Ettore Fieramosca and Niccolò de' Lapi, both by Massimo D'Azeglio; and L'assedio di Firenze by Francesco Domenico Guerrazzi.

Hundreds of his watercolors are currently held in the National Museum at the Castel Sant'Angelo and the Museum of the Risorgimento in Milan. In 2000, fifty previously unpublished works were presented at an exhibition in New York.
