= Bonanno Pisano =

Italian sculptor

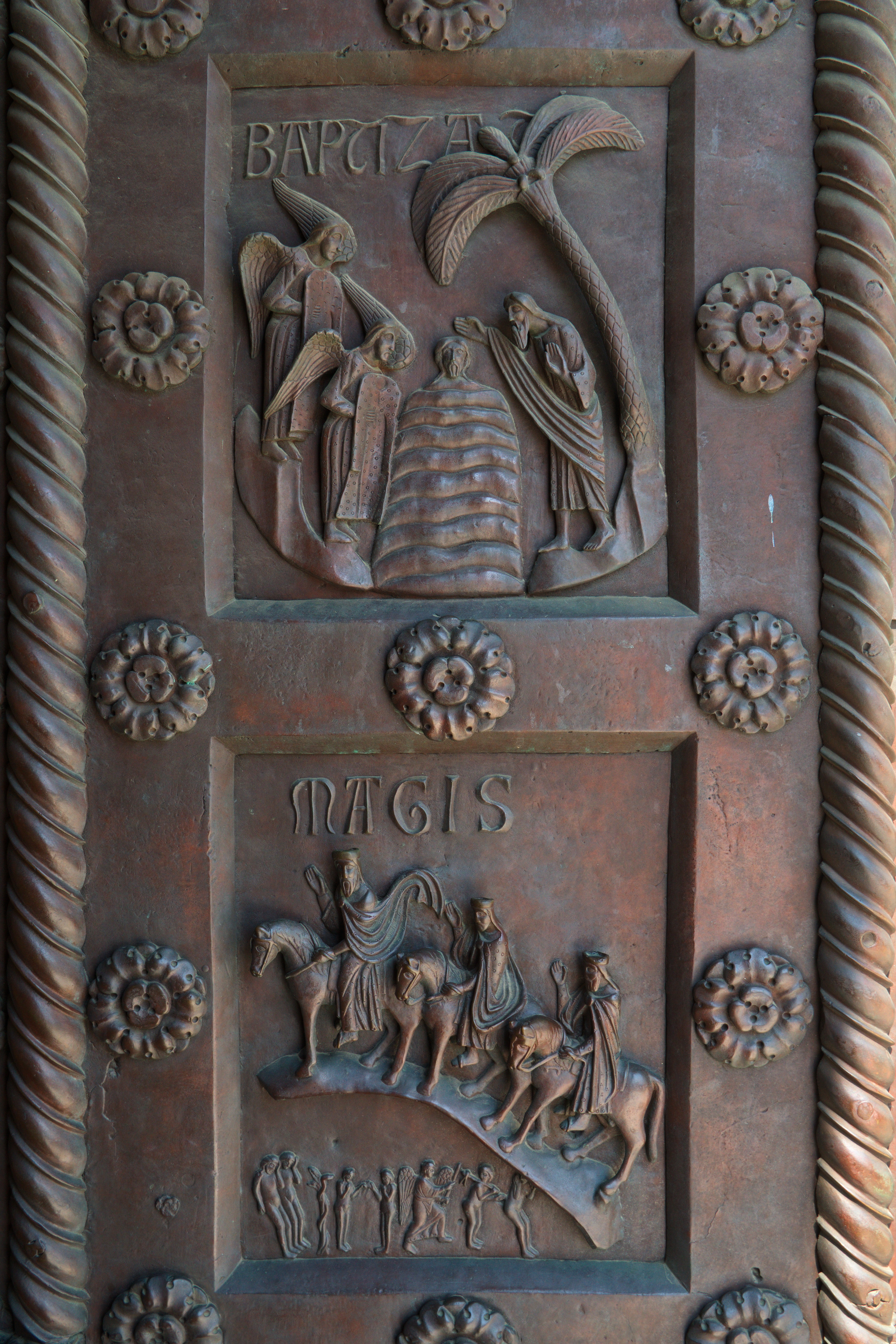
Detail of the San Ranieri gate at Pisa cathedral

Bonanno Pisano (born in Pisa; fl. 1170s–1180s) was an Italian sculptor, mixing Byzantine and classical elements. Giorgio Vasari attributed the realization of the Leaning Tower of Pisa to him in his Vite. Bonanno was born in Pisa and worked there most of his life. In the 1180s, he departed for Monreale, in Sicily, where he completed the doors to the cathedral before returning to Pisa, where he died. Bonanno was buried at the foot of the leaning tower, where his sarcophagus was discovered in 1820.

== The Leaning Tower Of Pisa ==
Bonanno Pisano is said to have used his sculpting skills to contribute to the design of the Leaning Tower of Pisa in 1175, one year after the construction began, since his name was found at the foot of the tower in 1820. Nobody quite knows how he contributed exactly, but is expected to have been one of the sculptors that designed the original blueprints.

Between March 1179 and March 1180, he created the bronze Porta Reale of the cathedral of Pisa, which was destroyed in the 1595 fire.

== The San Ranieri gate in Pisa ==
From 1186 on, he constructed the San Ranieri door, at the southern transept of the Duomo, depicting the main episodes of the Life of Christ.

== The gate of the cathedral of Monreale ==
Constructed between 1185 and 1186, the gate is signed Bonanno civis pisanus. It depicts five scenes of the Old Testament at the bottom, starting with Adam and Eve, and five scenes of the New Testament at the top, ending in "Christ and Mary in the glory of Paradise".

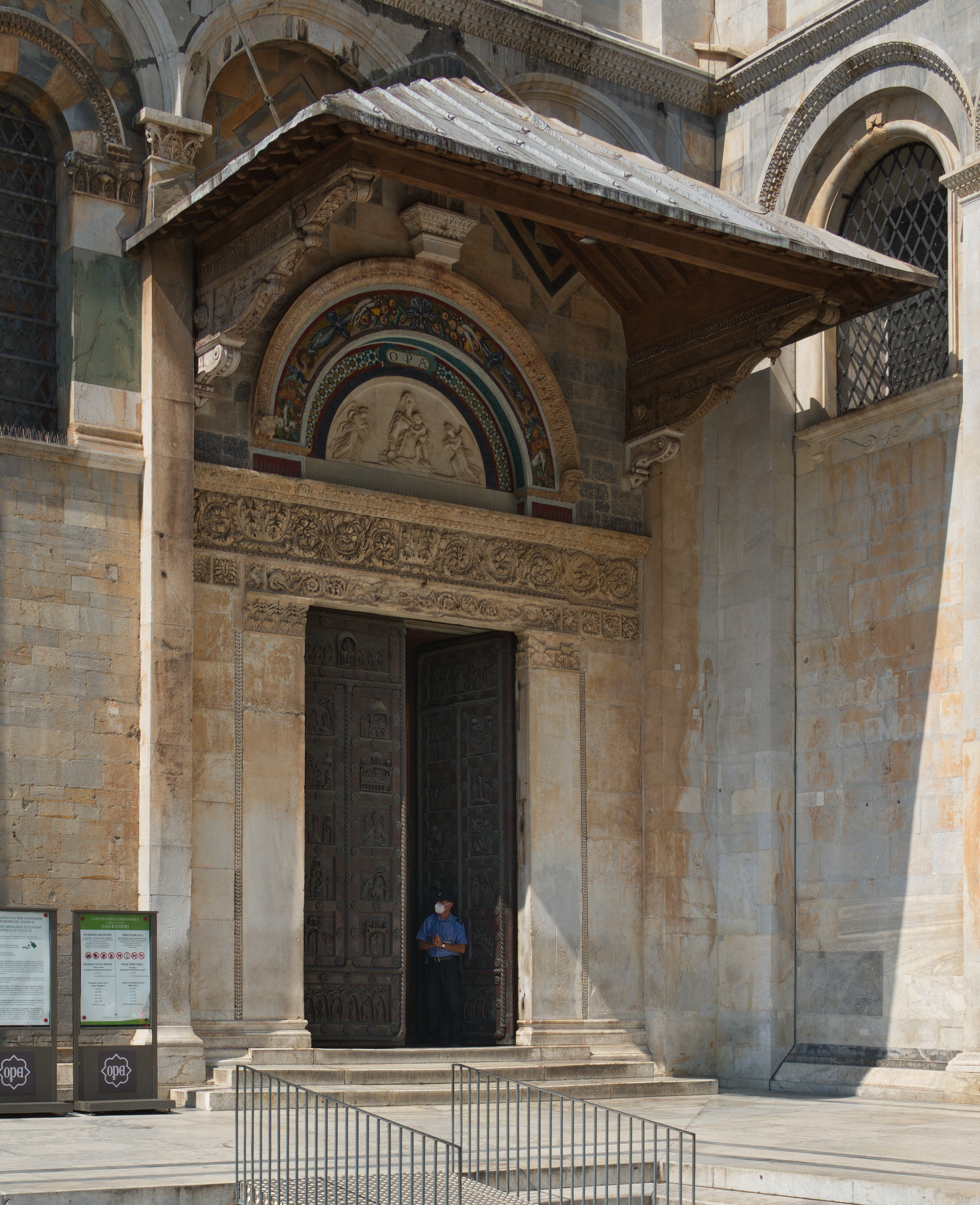
The San Ranieri door

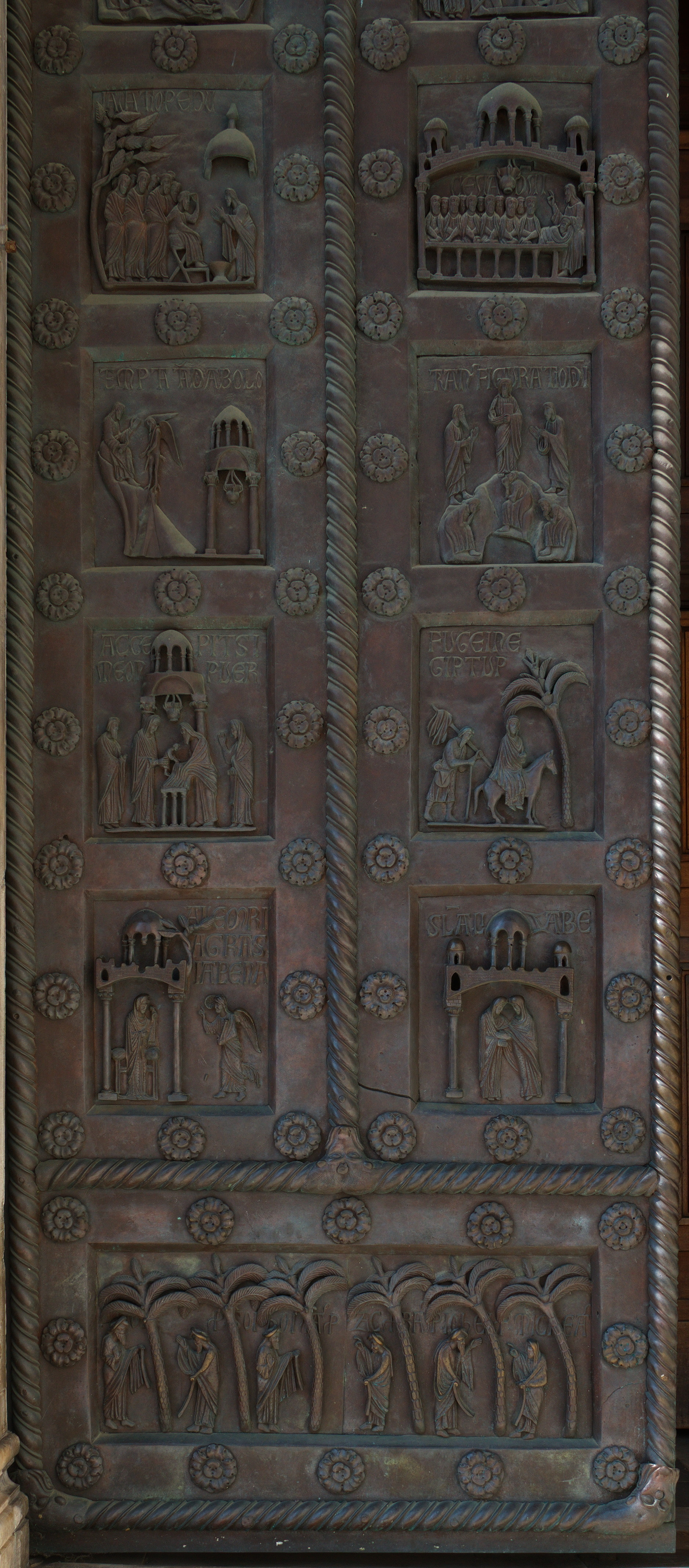
Left wing of the San Ranieri door

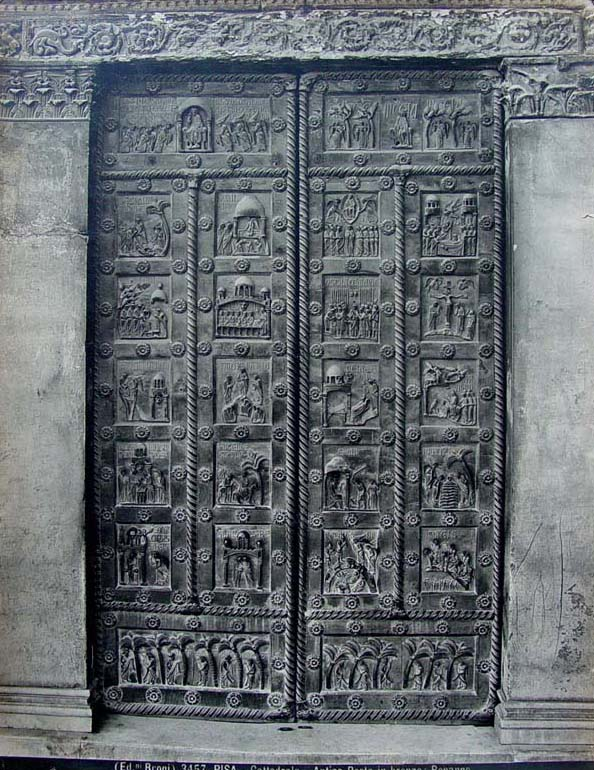
The San Ranieri gate in a late 19th ct. photography by Giacomo Brogi

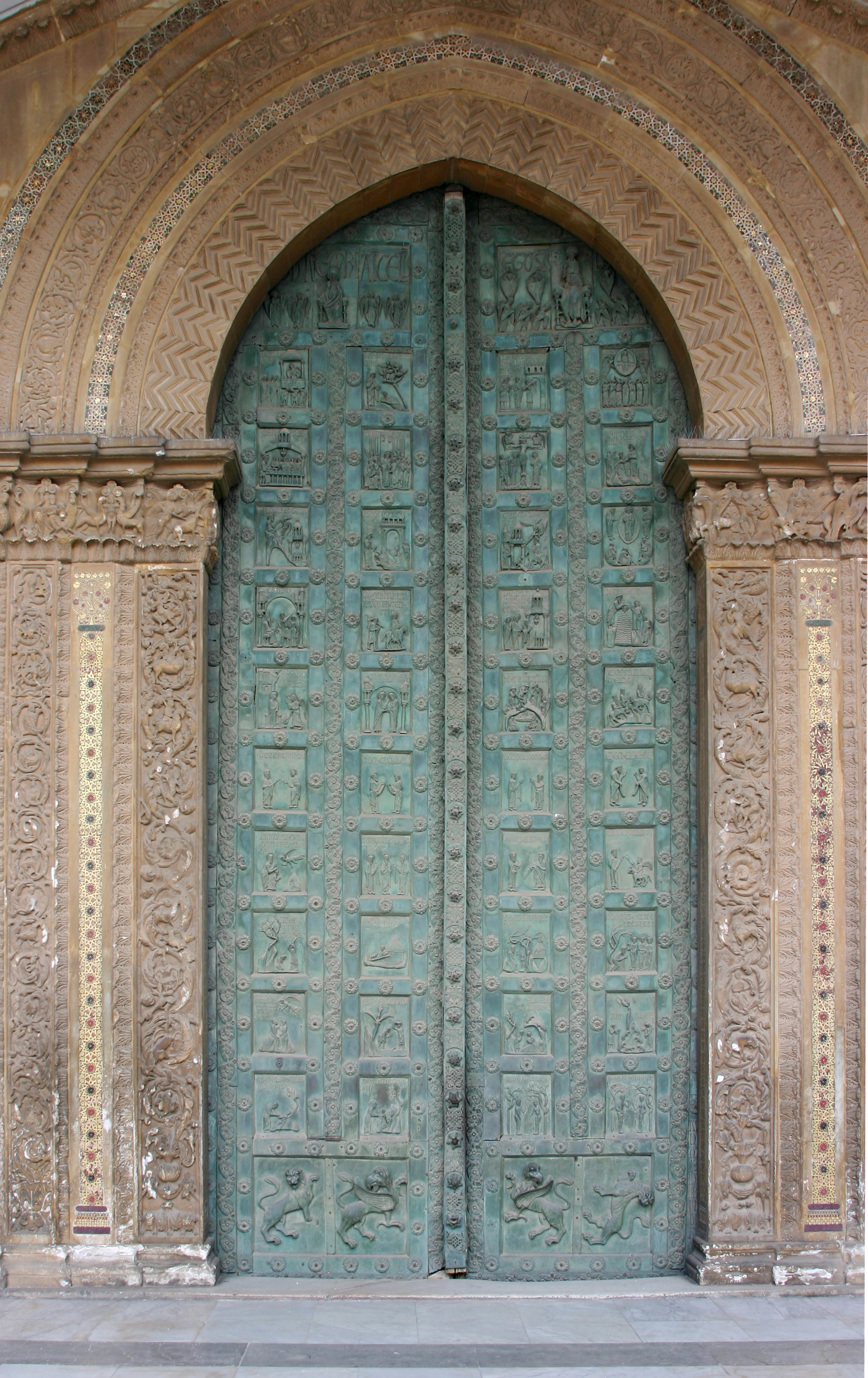
Monreale Cathedral gate

== Claimed Joseph Bonanno ancestry ==
The Italian-American mafia boss Joseph Bonanno claimed to be a descendant of Pisano, and was known to joke about the Leaning Tower of Pisa saying that "even that was crooked".

== Sources ==
- Milone, Antonio (2004). "Bonanno Pisano". In Castelnuovo, Enrico (ed.). Artifex bonus. Rome–Bari: Editori Laterza. pp. 82–89.
