= Carlo Naya =

Italian photographer (1816–1882)

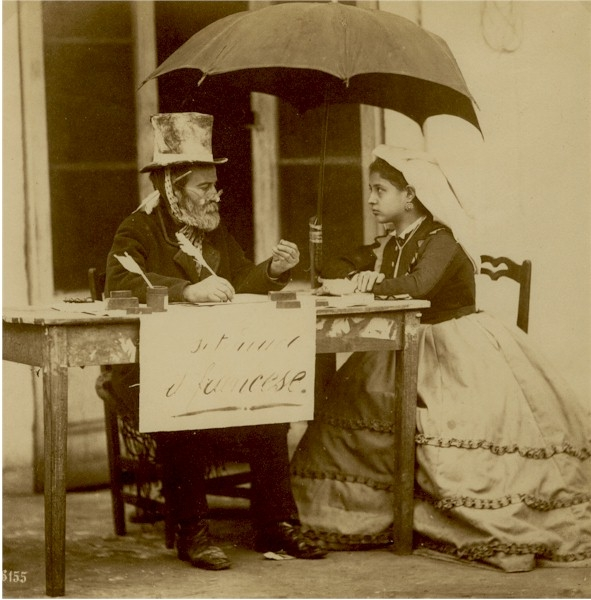
The street scribe, c. 1865

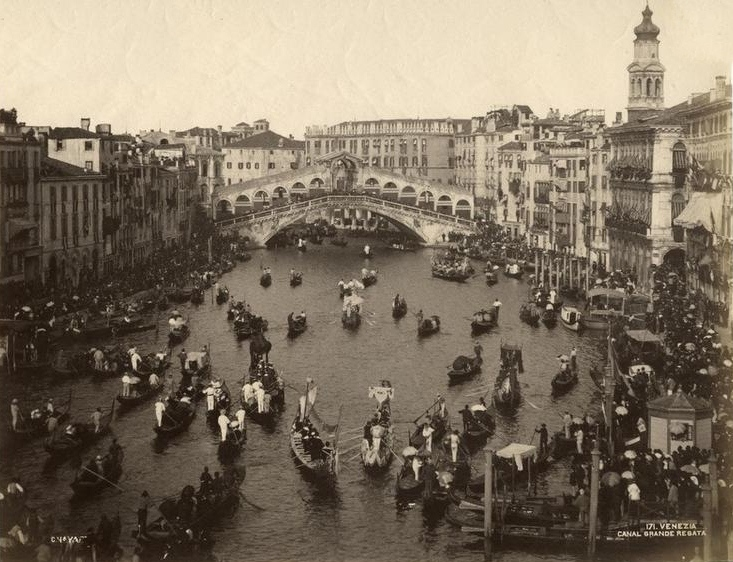
Venice - Canal Grande regatta

Carlo Naya (1816 in Tronzano Vercellese – 1882 in Venice) was an Italian photographer known for his pictures of Venice including its works of art and views of the city for a collaborative volume in 1866. He also documented the restoration of Giotto's frescoes at the Scrovegni Chapel in Padua.

Naya was born in Tronzano di Vercelli in 1816 and studied law at the University of Pisa. An inheritance allowed him to travel to major cities in Europe, Asia, and northern Africa. He was advertising his services as portrait photographer in Istanbul in 1845, and opened his studio in Venice in 1857. He sold his work through photographer and optician Carlo Ponti.

Following Naya's death in 1882, his studio was run by his wife, then by her second husband. In 1918, it was closed and publisher Osvaldo Böhm bought most of Naya's archive.
