= Domenico Bresolin =

Italian painter and photographer (1813–1900)

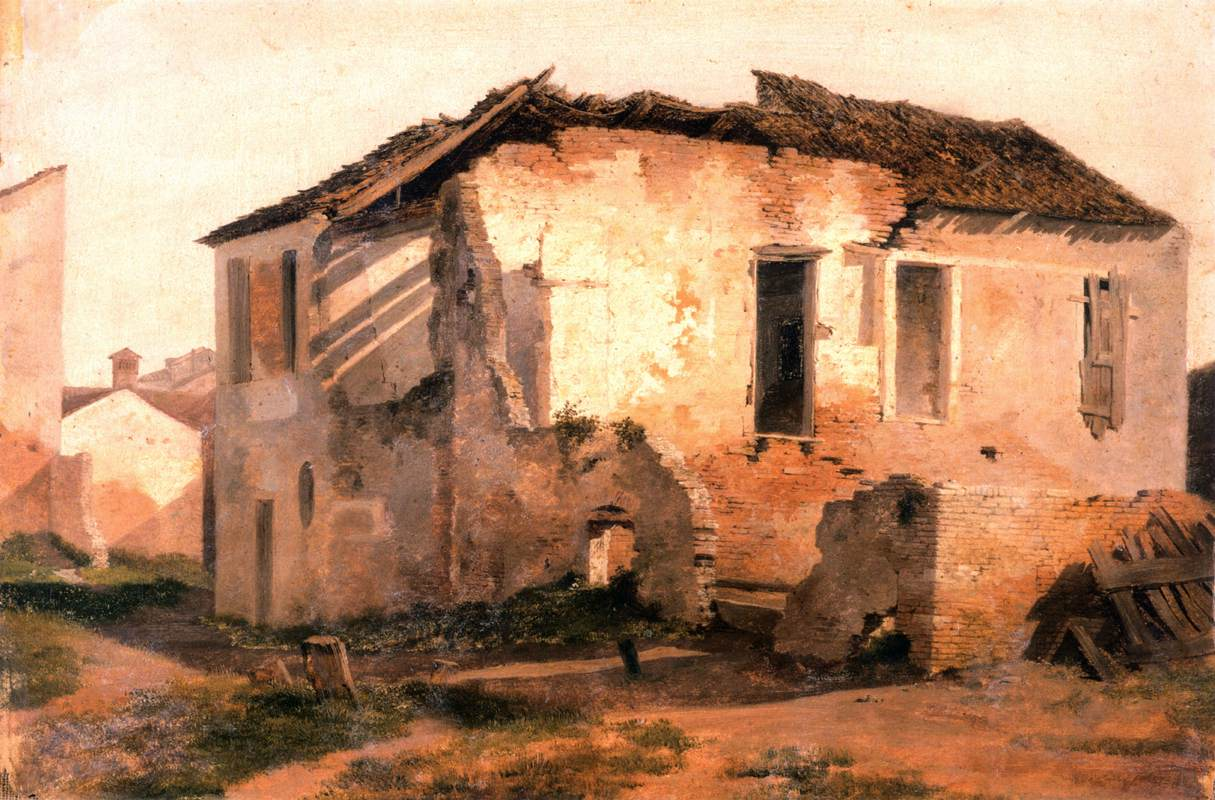
Ruined House (c.1860)

Domenico Bresolin (1813 – 1900) was an Italian painter and photographer, specializing in vedute of Venice.

== Biography ==
He was born in Padua. He first trained as a decorative painter, but then dedicated himself to landscape paintings and architectural vedute. He traveled to Florence, where he worked with the Hungarian painter Carlo Markò. From there he went to Rome. He did not find success however as a painter, and developed a career in outdoor photography, then in its infancy. In 1864, he began to teach courses in landscape art at the Academy of Fine Arts in Venice. One of his pupils was Guglielmo Ciardi. His photographic archives were acquired by Carlo Ponti (photographer).
