= Francesco Ratti =

Italian engraver

Francesco Ratti (19 September 1819, Milan – 17 December 1895, Bologna) was an Italian engraver.

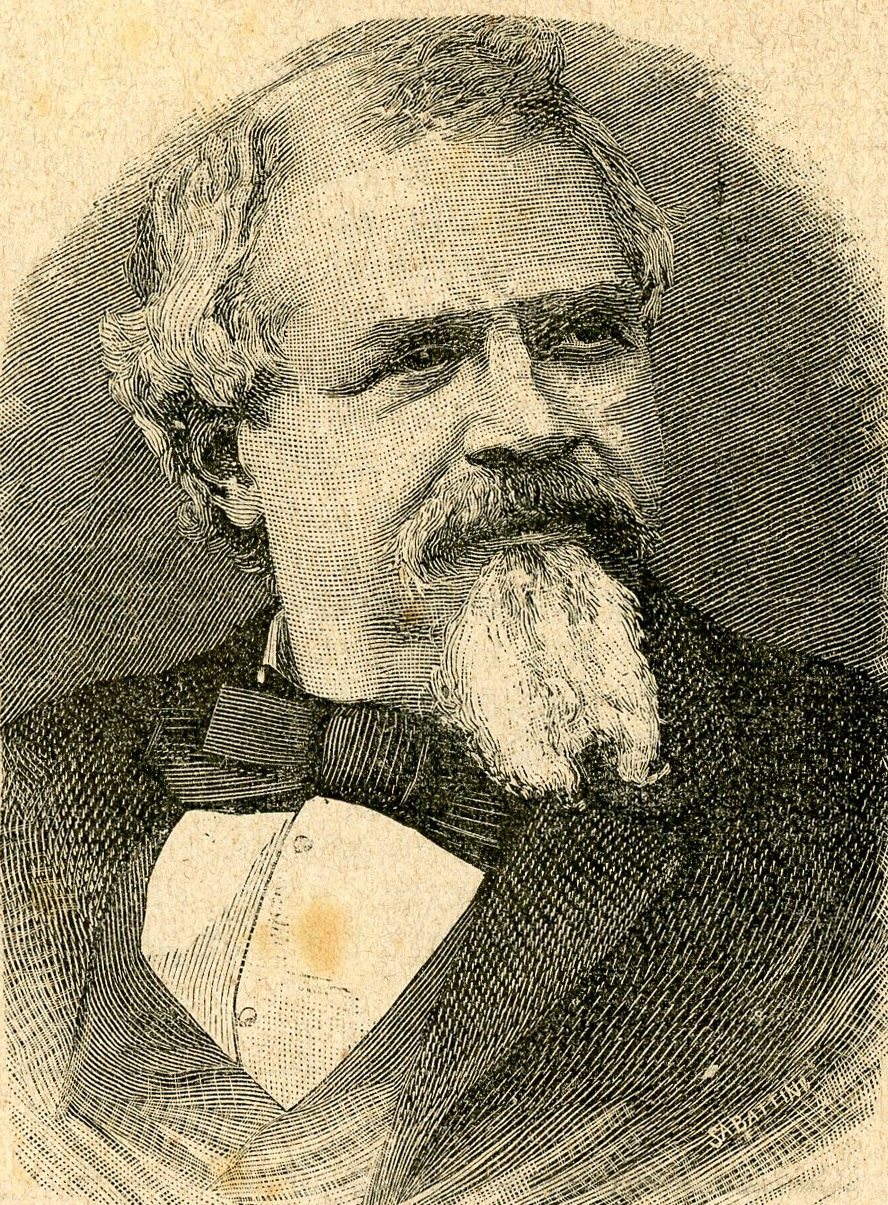
Portrait of Francesco Ratti. Wood-engraving from L'Illustrazione Popolare

== Biography ==
He studied painting, then engraving under Luigi Sacchi. In the studio of Sacchi he completed illustrations for a publication of The Betrothed (I promessi sposi) by Alessandro Manzoni. Later with his colleagues in Milan, he founded a school of engraving attended by Giuseppe Balbiani, G. Gallieni, and Giuseppe Centenari. In 1845, he won a silver medal for work displayed at the Brera Academy. In 1847 he moved to Turin to work under the Pomba publishing house. In 1848, due to political tumult, il Mondo illustrato ceased printing; Ratti moved to Genoa, then Milan, then again to Turin, where il Mondo illustrato, was reissued. Mamiani, minister of public education, named Ratti to the position of directing a newly founded school of wood-engraving at the Academy of Fine Arts of Bologna.

He was prolific as an engraver for journals and books, for example, depicting illustrations of the tragedies of Schiller, translated by Andrea Maffei and published by Pirola. He published the anatomical plates for a publication by Sappey. He also engraved chemistry texts including All'assiduità degli studi chimici.
