= Luigi Sacchi =

Italian engraver and photographer

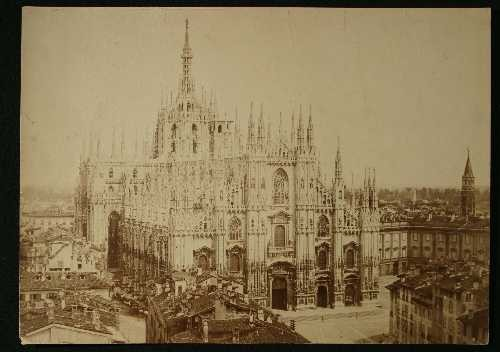
Piazza Duomo in Milan, photograph by Luigi Sacchi

Luigi Sacchi (4 August 1805 – 22 June 1861) was an Italian painter and engraver, but is chiefly notable as an early photographer, active mostly around his native city of Milan.

He trained at the Accademia delle Belle Arti di Brera and worked both as a painter and an engraver before taking up photography in 1845 along with his brother, specialising in architectural photography. In 1859 the Sacchi brothers began publishing an art and photography magazine titled L'Artista from the studio of Pompeo Pozzi.

== Biography ==
Luigi Sacchi, who came into contact with the art world from an early age because of the professions of his father, Giuseppe, and cousin Defendente, enrolled at the Brera Academy in 1822. After an early career in painting, in which he was inspired by Francesco Hayez and Pelagio Palagi, going so far as to exhibit seven oil paintings at the annual Exhibitions of the Imperial Regia Accademia between 1827 and 1829, he shifted his artistic interest to woodcuts and lithography. Driven by a desire to document and popularize the artistic and cultural heritage of the Italian peninsula through these means, he assumed from 1835 the graphic direction of the magazine Cosmorama Pittorico whose general editorship was entrusted to his brother Giuseppe, his father's namesake, and his cousin Defendente. The magazine was a significant success, obtaining subscription requests from several parts of the peninsula in a still pre-unitary Italy.
