= Pompeo Pozzi =

Italian painter and photographer (1817–1890)

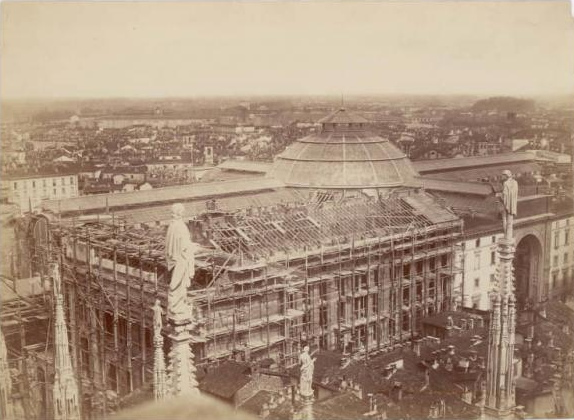
Construction of Palazzo Haas (now Galleria Vittorio Emanuele II, in 1870-1873

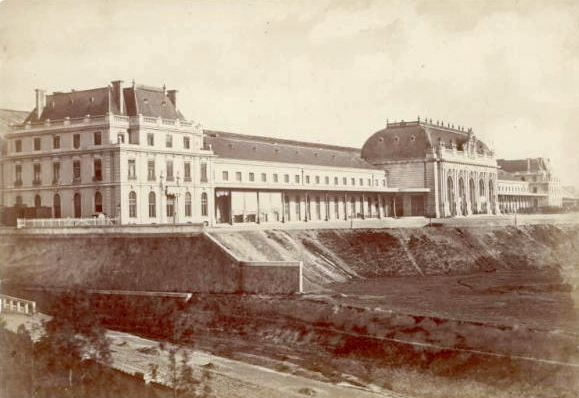
Milan Stazione Centrale after 1864

Pompeo Pozzi (1817–1888) was an Italian painter, but is best known for his photographs.

Pozzi studied at the Brera Academy of Art, and was a resident of Milan. He mainly painted alpine landscapes and seascapes. The painter Luigi Sacchi in 1859 began publishing an art and photography magazine titled L Artista from Pozzi's studio. Many of Pozzi's photographs are now at the Bibliothèque Nationale de France and the École Nationale Supérieure des Beaux-Arts in Paris.
