= Giacomo Brogi =

Italian photographer (1822–1881)

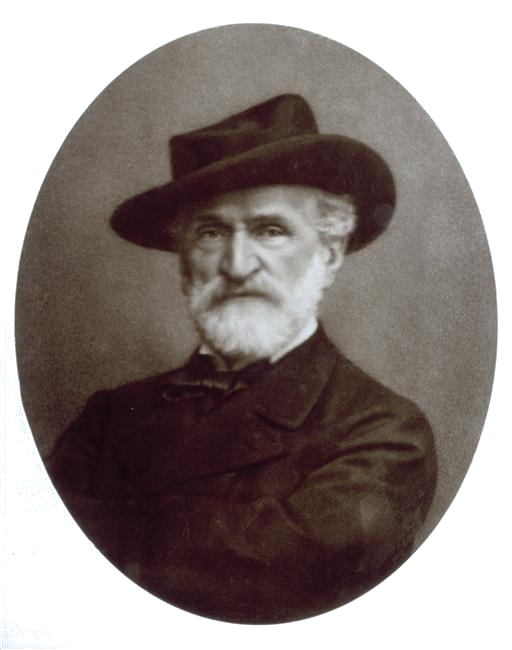
Portrait of Giuseppe Verdi by Giacomo Brogi.

Giacomo Brogi (6 April 1822 – 29 November 1881) was an Italian photographer.

Giacomo Brogi created his first studio in Corso Tintori, in Florence in 1864. He began traveling around Italy and later traveled to the Middle East in 1868 including Palestine, Egypt and Syria. Brogi was associated with the Photographic Society of Italy. The factory was located on the Lungarno delle Grazie, 15, in Florence. There were shops located:

- Florence. Via Tornabuoni 1.
- Naples. Via Chiatamone 19 bis.
- Rome. Via del Corso 419.

After death, his son Carlo continued his photographic work.
